= List of euasterid families =

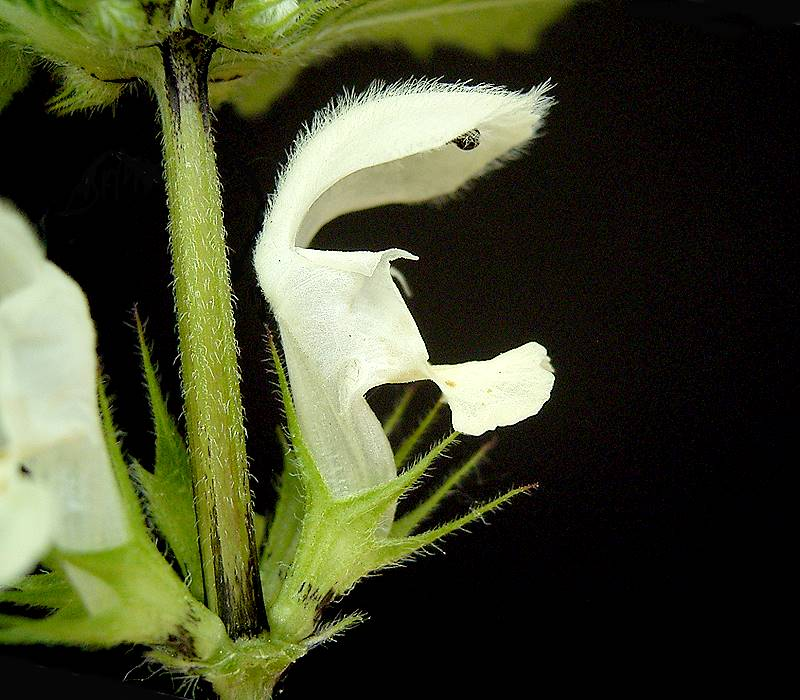
Lamium album. Lamium originates from the Greek for "wide-open mouth" (on the flowers).

The euasterids or core asterids are a group of 69 interrelated families in 15 orders of flowering plants. (Note: The taxonomy (classification) in this list follows Plants of the World (2017) and the fourth Angiosperm Phylogeny Group system. Total counts of genera for each family come from Plants of the World Online (POWO). (See the POWO license.) Extinct taxa are not included.) They tend to have petals that are fused with each other and with the bases of the stamens, and just one integument (covering) around the embryo sac. The asterids as a whole (the euasterids plus two orders of basal asterids) represent almost a third of all flowering plant species.

The euasterids include trees, shrubs, vines and herbaceous perennials and annuals. Sweet potatoes are a tropical staple food. Basil, oregano, sage, rosemary, thyme and peppermint are all kitchen herbs in the mint family. Olives have been cultivated around the Mediterranean for food and oil for at least five thousand years. The daisy family includes lettuce, artichokes, Stevia, sunflowers and tarragon.

== Glossary ==
From the glossary of botanical terms:

- annual: a plant species that completes its life cycle within a single year or growing season
- basal: attached close to the base (of a plant or an evolutionary tree diagram)
- climber: a vine that leans on, twines around or clings to other plants for vertical support
- deciduous: falling seasonally, as with bark, leaves, or petals
- glandular hair: a hair tipped with a secretory structure
- herbaceous: not woody; usually green and soft in texture
- mangrove: any shrub or small tree growing in brackish or salt water
- perennial: not an annual or biennial
- succulent (adjective): juicy or fleshy
- unisexual: of one sex; bearing only male or only female reproductive organs
- woody: hard and lignified; not herbaceous

The APG IV system is the fourth in a series of plant taxonomies from the Angiosperm Phylogeny Group. In this system, the euasterids are divided into the lamiids and the campanulids. (Note: There have been signs of support since APG IV for one or more new euasterid orders that belong to neither the lamiids nor the campanulids.) The order Icacinales is basal within the lamiids.

Six euasterid orders have more than two families: Apiales, Aquifoliales, Asterales, Gentianales, Lamiales and Solanales. Apiales and Asterales are exceptionally diverse, with 2342 genera between them. (Note: See the table for totals.) Aquifoliales is basal within the campanulids. Gentianales species have pitted wood and opposite leaves that are joined across the stem. In Lamiales, plants are mostly herbaceous with opposite leaves, and the five-lobed flowers have approximate mirror-image symmetry. Solanales species usually have sepals that continue to grow with age, even when the plant is fruiting.

== Families ==
Families
Family and a common name (Note: Each family's formal name ends in the Latin suffix -aceae and is derived from the name of a genus that is or once was part of the family.)	Type genus and etymology (Note: Some plants were named for naturalists (unless otherwise noted).)	Total genera; global distribution	Description and uses	Order	Type genus images
Acanthaceae (bear's-breeches family)	Acanthus, from Greek for "thorns"	206 genera, mostly tropical, with some species in warm-temperate zones	Annual and perennial shrubs, vines and herbaceous plants, with a few trees and mangroves. Many of the ornamental species have long-lasting flowers. Acanthus leaves are commonly depicted on architectural columns and ornate furniture.	Lamiales	Acanthus mollis
Alseuosmiaceae (toropapa family)	Alseuosmia, from Greek for "grove fragrance"	4 genera, in New Zealand, Australia and Melanesia	Shrubs growing in soil or on other plants	Asterales	Alseuosmia quercifolia
Apiaceae (carrot family)	Apium, from a Latin plant name	446 genera, worldwide	Herbaceous plants and shrubs, with a few trees. The family includes carrot, celery, parsley, dill and fennel.	Apiales	Apium prostratum
Apocynaceae (periwinkle family)	Apocynum, from the Greek name for dogbane or a similar plant	377 genera, distributed throughout the tropics, with a few genera extending into northern and southern temperate zones	A large family with trees, shrubs, mangroves, epiphytes, succulents, and woody and herbaceous vines. Some species have edible fruits or roots, but poisonous seeds. Some have been harvested commercially for timber or to make rubber. Many are ornamentals, including oleander and Vinca (periwinkle).	Gentianales	Apocynum androsaemifolium
Aquifoliaceae (holly family)	Ilex. Aquifolium, an earlier synonym, is from a Latin plant name.	1 genus, worldwide	Unisexual shrubs and trees. Various species of the single genus are grown as winter ornamentals or brewed to make teas.	Aquifoliales	Ilex opaca
Araliaceae (ivy family)	Aralia, from a French-Canadian plant name	46 genera, worldwide	Vines, herbaceous perennials, shrubs and trees	Apiales	Aralia elata
Argophyllaceae (silverleaf family)	Argophyllum, from Greek for "silver leaves"	2 genera, in Oceania	Hairy shrubs and small trees	Asterales	—
Asteraceae (daisy family)	Aster, from Latin for "star"	1701 genera, worldwide	Shrubs, dwarf shrubs, trees and vines, with some species that grow in water or on other plants. This very diverse family includes lettuce, artichokes, Stevia, sunflowers and tarragon, and ornamentals such as daisies, marigolds, chrysanthemums and many species called asters.	Asterales	Aster bellidiastrum
Bignoniaceae (trumpetvine family)	Bignonia, for Jean-Paul Bignon (1662–1743), a French statesman and royal librarian	79 genera, distributed widely in the tropics and subtropics, with a few species in temperate zones	Trees, shrubs, vines and perennial herbaceous plants, mostly evergreen. Various species are used in Thai and Laotian cuisine, and to make a drink in Nicaragua. Many species are ornamentals.	Lamiales	Bignonia capreolata
Boraginaceae (forget-me-not family)	Borago, possibly from Latin for "hairy covering"	157 genera, worldwide, with the greatest diversity in Eurasia	Shrubs, trees, vines and herbaceous plants. Borage is cultivated for its oil. Mertensia maritima is an Inuit staple food. Many species are ornamentals. Alkanna tinctoria has been used as a dye since ancient times.	Boraginales	Borago officinalis
Bruniaceae (buttonbush family)	Brunia, for Alexander Brown (fl. 1692–1698), an English doctor and plant collector	6 genera, in South Africa	Ericoid (heather-like) shrubs, with a few trees. Berzelia and Brunia are grown and bred as ornamentals.	Bruniales	Brunia noduliflora
Byblidaceae (rainbowplant family)	Byblis, for Byblis, a Greek mythological character	1 genus, in Australia and Papua New Guinea	Shrubby rhizomatous herbaceous plants. These plants have sticky glands on their stalks that trap and kill insects.	Lamiales	Byblis liniflora
Calyceraceae (balsamleaf family)	Calycera, from Greek for "calyx horn"	8 genera, in South America	Herbaceous perennials and a few annuals, frequently with leaves all attached to the base	Asterales	Calycera crassifolia
Campanulaceae (bellflower family)	Campanula, from Latin for "little bell" (the flowers)	94 genera, worldwide	Shrubs, short trees, vines and herbaceous plants, with a few species that grow in water or on other plants. Many genera, including Campanula and Lobelia, are grown as ornamentals.	Asterales	Campanula cochlearifolia
Caprifoliaceae (honeysuckle family)	Lonicera. Caprifolium, an earlier synonym, is from Latin for "goat leaves".	33 genera, mainly in the non-tropical Northern Hemisphere	Vines, herbaceous plants, shrubs and trees. Honeysuckle is grown as an ornamental and for its scent.	Dipsacales	Lonicera caprifolium
Cardiopteridaceae (churnwood family)	Cardiopteris, from Greek for "heart wing" or "fern" (the fruit)	5 genera, scattered worldwide	Hairy evergreen shrubs and trees	Aquifoliales	—
Carlemanniaceae (fragrant-princess family)	Carlemannia, for Charles Morgan Lemann (1806–1852)	2 genera, in tropical Southeast Asia	Shrubs and herbaceous perennials with asymmetrical leaves	Lamiales	Silvianthus bracteatus (not the type genus)
Columelliaceae (Andean-holly family)	Columellia, for Columella (1st century)	2 genera, in Costa Rica and western South America	Evergreen shrubs and trees	Bruniales	—
Convolvulaceae (bindweed family)	Convolvulus, from Latin for "twining"	58 genera, worldwide, with more diversity in warm temperate zones and the tropics	Woody and herbaceous vines, shrubs and a few trees. Sweet potatoes are a tropical staple food. Shoots of Ipomoea aquatica are commonly used in Asian cooking. "Morning glory" is a common name for many ornamentals in this family.	Solanales	Convolvulus tricolor
Escalloniaceae (currybush family)	Escallonia, for Antonio José Escallón y Flórez (1739–1819), a Spanish official and plant-hunter in South America	8 genera, mainly in the Southern Hemisphere	Evergreen shrubs and trees, with a few herbaceous annuals. Escallonia rubra is grown as an ornamental and hedge plant.	Escalloniales	Escallonia rubra
Eucommiaceae (Chinese-rubbertree family)	Eucommia, from Greek for "good gum"	1 genus, in China	Deciduous trees with spirally arranged leaves. The latex is converted to rubber for insulation and dental fillings.	Garryales	Eucommia ulmoides
Garryaceae (tasselbush family)	Garrya, for Nicholas Garry (c. 1782 – 1856), a merchant and trader	2 genera. Garrya is native to the Americas, and Aucuba is native to East Asia; both are widely cultivated as ornamentals.	Evergreen shrubs and trees with leathery leaves. Aucuba tolerates coal pollution and became a popular garden plant during the Industrial Revolution.	Garryales	Garrya elliptica
Gelsemiaceae (yellow-jessamine family)	Gelsemium, from an Italian plant name	3 genera, in the tropics and subtropics, with a few species extending into North America	Trees, shrubs and woody vines with clear sap. The poisonous yellow jessamine is sometimes grown as an ornamental, especially in the southern United States, and is the state flower of South Carolina.	Gentianales	Gelsemium sempervirens
Gentianaceae (gentian family)	Gentiana, for Gentius (d. 168 BC), an Illyrian king	103 genera, worldwide	A large family that includes trees, shrubs, vines and other annuals and perennials, some relying on fungi and organic material rather than photosynthesis. Some scented flowers of Fagraea have been used commercially in perfumes, and trees of this genus are harvested for timber in tropical Asia. Gentian root (from Gentiana lutea) is an ingredient in some liqueurs.	Gentianales	Gentiana verna
Gesneriaceae (gloxinia family)	Gesneria, for Conrad Gessner (1516–1565)	153 genera, in the tropics worldwide, extending into subtropical and warmer temperate zones	Shrubs, treelets, climbers and herbaceous plants, growing in soil, on rocks or on other plants. Ornamentals include Calceolaria, (Note: Many taxonomists prefer to place Calceolaria and Jovellana into a separate family, called Calceolariaceae.) florist's gloxinia, African violets and Cape primroses.	Lamiales	Gesneria pauciflora
Goodeniaceae (fanflower family)	Goodenia, for Samuel Goodenough (1743–1827)	7 genera, mostly in Australia	Herbaceous plants and shrubs, with a few viny shrubs. Scaevola aemula is grown in flower beds and pots.	Asterales	Goodenia hederacea
Griseliniaceae (kapuka family)	Griselinia, for Francesco Griselini (1717–1783), an Italian botanist	1 genus, in New Zealand and South America	Unisexual shrubs, trees and vines, growing in soil and on other plants	Apiales	Griselinia littoralis
Helwingiaceae (flowering-rafts family)	Helwingia, for Georg Andreas Helwing (1666–1748)	1 genus, in South Asia and East Asia	Unisexual shrubs, with a few small trees	Aquifoliales	Helwingia himalaica
Hydroleaceae (fiddleleaf family)	Hydrolea, from Greek for "water olive"	1 genus, scattered worldwide, generally in aquatic or at least moist habitats	Spiny annual and perennial shrubs and herbaceous plants, usually in moist environments. Hydrolea zeylanica shoots are used in Indonesian cooking. Hydrolea spinosa is an invasive species.	Solanales	Hydrolea ovata
Icacinaceae (false-yam family)	Icacina, from an Arawak name	24 genera, throughout the tropics, with one genus (Apodytes) extending into the subtropics	Vines, shrubs and trees. Icacina flour is used in parts of Africa, and Miquelia is used for timber.	Icacinales	Icacina oliviformis
Lamiaceae (mint family)	Lamium, from a Latin plant name, originally from Greek for "wide-open mouth" (on the flowers)	232 genera, worldwide	Generally aromatic shrubs and herbaceous plants, with some trees and vines. Many species and genera produce kitchen herbs, including basil, oregano, sage, rosemary, thyme, peppermint and other mints. Mint oil is widely used in the cosmetics and food industries.	Lamiales	Lamium purpureum
Lentibulariaceae (bladderwort family)	Utricularia. Lentibularia, an earlier synonym for the genus, is probably from Greek for "lentil-shaped bladders".	3 genera, almost worldwide, with the greatest diversity in the tropics	Perennial and annual herbaceous plants, growing in soil, in water and on other plants. All three genera in this family can trap and digest small insects. Pinguicula is used to curdle milk in northern Europe, and occasionally to kill pests in greenhouses.	Lamiales	Utricularia vulgaris
Linderniaceae (wishbone-flower family)	Lindernia, for Franz Balthasar von Lindern (1682–1755), a French physician and botanist	20 genera, in the tropics, except for a few temperate species	Annual and perennial herbaceous plants, with some shrubs. Stems often have four flat sides. Ornamental genera include Torenia and Craterostigma.	Lamiales	Lindernia dubia
Loganiaceae (Indian-pink family)	Logania, for James Logan (1674–1751)	16 genera, in the tropics, mostly	Trees, shrubs, woody vines and herbaceous plants with clear sap. Many species in this family contain the pest-control poison strychnine.	Gentianales	Logania albiflora
Martyniaceae (unicornplant family)	Martynia, for John Martyn (1699–1768)	5 genera, in the tropical and subtropical Americas	Annuals and perennials, herbaceous with a few shrubs, usually strong-smelling. Three of the five genera are covered in sticky hairs that trap and kill insects.	Lamiales	Martynia annua
Mazaceae (cupflower family)	Mazus, from Greek for "teat". The lower lip of the flowers is swollen.	4 genera, in Tibet, temperate East Asia, and Oceania	Annual and perennial rhizomatous herbaceous plants with stems with four flat sides. Mazus is planted as an ornamental groundcover.	Lamiales	Mazus pumilus
Menyanthaceae (bogbean family)	Menyanthes, from a Greek plant name for "small flowers" or "moon flowers"	6 genera, almost worldwide	Herbaceous plants, mostly aquatic	Asterales	—
Metteniusaceae (urupagua family)	Metteniusa, for Georg Heinrich Mettenius (1823–1866)	10 genera, throughout the tropics	Evergreen shrubs and trees with spirally arranged leaves. Some of the fruits and nuts are consumed in South America.	Metteniusales	Metteniusa tessmanniana
Montiniaceae (wild-clovebush family)	Montinia, for Lars Jonasson Montin (1723–1785), a Swedish botanist and physician	3 genera, in southern Africa, East Africa and Madagascar	Shrubs and small trees. Crushed leaves of Grevea and Montinia have an acrid taste of pepper and cloves.	Solanales	Montinia caryophyllacea
Myodocarpaceae (mousefruit family)	Myodocarpus, from Greek for "mouse (-eared) fruit"	2 genera, in Maritime Southeast Asia and Melanesia	Shrubs and trees	Apiales	—
Oleaceae (olive family)	Olea, from a Latin plant name	29 genera, in temperate zones worldwide	Shrubs, trees and woody vines, usually with opposite leaves. Olives have been cultivated around the Mediterranean for food and oil for at least 5000 years. Ash trees are harvested for their strong, flexible timber. Jasmine is used in perfumes and teas. Forsythia and lilacs are sold as cut flowers.	Lamiales	Olea europaea
Oncothecaceae (kanak-laurel family)	Oncotheca, from Greek for "bulging box" or "bulky anthers"	1 genus, in New Caledonia	Evergreen trees and shrubs with leathery leaves	Icacinales	Dried Oncotheca humboldtiana
Orobanchaceae (broomrape family)	Orobanche, from Greek and Latin plant names	99 genera, distributed nearly worldwide	Usually parasitic herbaceous plants, occasionally woody or shrubby, and sometimes lacking chlorophyll. Cistanche phelypaea is consumed by the Tuareg in North Africa. Many species are agricultural pests that target beans, sugarcane, sunflowers or other crops.	Lamiales	Orobanche picridis
Paracryphiaceae (possumwood family)	Paracryphia, from Greek for "almost hidden"	3 genera, in Maritime Southeast Asia and Oceania	Trees and shrubs with leathery leaves	Paracryphiales	—
Paulowniaceae (empress-tree family)	Paulownia, for Anna Pavlovna of Russia (1795–1865)	3 genera, scattered in Asia	Evergreen and deciduous trees and viny shrubs. The empress tree is often seen in gardens and parks in North America and Europe.	Lamiales	Paulownia tomentosa
Pedaliaceae (sesame family)	Pedalium, from Greek for "rudder"	11 genera, mostly in sub-Saharan Africa. Sesame is widely cultivated.	Annual and perennial herbaceous plants, with some deciduous shrubs and trees. Many species have either tubers that store water or succulent trunks. Sesame was in cultivation at least 5500 years ago in Asia, and is today one of the ten most important vegetable oil crops. The seeds are widely used in baking.	Lamiales	Pedalium murex
Pennantiaceae (kaikomako family)	Pennantia, for Thomas Pennant (1726–1798)	1 genus, in Australia and New Zealand	Shrubs and trees, some buttressed, with unisexual flowers, along with a few vines	Apiales	Pennantia baylisiana
Pentaphragmataceae (scorpion's tail family)	Pentaphragma, from Greek for "five fences" (around the ovaries)	1 genus, in China and Southeast Asia	Herbaceous, slightly succulent perennials	Asterales	Pentaphragma ellipticum
Phellinaceae (corkfruit family)	Phelline, from Greek for "corky" (the fruits and seeds)	1 genus, in New Caledonia	Shade-loving unisexual evergreen shrubs and trees	Asterales	—
Phrymaceae (lopseed family)	Phryma, possibly from Greek for "toad"	15 genera, in Africa, the Americas, Asia and Oceania	Rhizomatous herbaceous plants, sometimes aquatic and sometimes slightly woody or shrubby. Mimulus and Leucocarpus have ornamental species.	Lamiales	Phryma leptostachya
Phyllonomaceae (flowering-leaf family)	Phyllonoma, from Greek for "leaf meadow" (the flowers sprouting from the leaves)	1 genus, in Central and South America and in Mexico	Smooth shrubs and trees	Aquifoliales	—
Pittosporaceae (cheesewood family)	Pittosporum, from Greek for "tar seeds"	9 genera, in Oceania and tropical and subtropical Africa and Asia	Shrubs, trees and vines, many with volatile oils	Apiales	Pittosporum tobira
Plantaginaceae (speedwell family)	Plantago, from a Latin plant name	106 genera, worldwide	Vines, shrubs, small trees and other herbaceous plants, growing in soil, in water and on other plants. Ornamentals include foxglove and snapdragon. Foxglove is also a source of digitalin, a heart stimulant. Psyllium is used medically to lower cholesterol and treat constipation.	Lamiales	Plantago lanceolata
Plocospermataceae (staghorn-shrub family)	Plocosperma, from Greek for "tufted seeds"	1 genus, in dry forests and scrubland in Mexico and Central America	One species of shrubs and small trees	Lamiales	Plocosperma buxifolium
Rousseaceae (putaweta family)	Roussea, for Jean-Jacques Rousseau (1712–1778), an Enlightenment philosopher	4 genera, in Oceania and Mauritius	Evergreen shrubs and trees, with a few climbers	Asterales	—
Rubiaceae (coffee family)	Rubia, from Latin for "red". The roots have provided a red dye going back millennia.	610 genera, worldwide	A large family of annuals and perennials, including vines, shrubs, trees and epiphytes. Coffee (Coffea) is the second most traded world primary product, after fossil fuels. Cinchona (the source of quinine) is still used as an antimalarial. Other plants produce edible fruits, natural dyes and timber.	Gentianales	Rubia tinctorum
Schlegeliaceae (higuerito family)	Schlegelia, for Hermann Schlegel (1804–1884)	4 genera, in the tropics of the Americas	Evergreens, including vines, shrubs and trees with pale bark	Lamiales	Schlegelia parasitica
Scrophulariaceae (figwort family)	Scrophularia, from Latin for "scrofula", which it supposedly cured	59 genera, almost worldwide	Herbaceous plants, deciduous and evergreen shrubs, and occasionally trees and vines. Ornamental genera include Eremophila, Scrophularia and Verbascum.	Lamiales	Scrophularia nodosa
Solanaceae (nightshade family)	Solanum, from a Latin plant name	100 genera, worldwide, especially in the Americas	Annual and perennial shrubs, trees, climbers and herbaceous plants, including a few epiphytes. Potatoes were first bred and cultivated around 8000 years ago and chili peppers around 6000 years ago in the Americas. Both were introduced around the world in the 1500s. Tomatoes, regarded by the Aztecs as weeds, became a staple food when introduced in Europe.	Solanales	Solanum umbelliferum
Sphenocleaceae (gooseweed family)	Sphenoclea, from Greek for "closed wedge" (on the fruit capsules)	1 genus, scattered in the tropics and subtropics	Herbaceous succulent annuals. Gooseweed, an invasive plant in rice cultivation, produces a compound that is effective against a common rice nematode.	Solanales	Sphenoclea zeylanica
Stemonuraceae (buff-beech family)	Stemonurus, from Greek for "stamen tail"	12 genera, mainly in the African and Asian tropics	Unisexual evergreen shrubs and trees	Aquifoliales	—
Stilbaceae (candlesticks family)	Stilbe, from Greek for "shining"	11 genera, in the Western Cape of South Africa, except for the tropical genus Nuxia	Evergreen shrubs, trees and perennial herbaceous plants. Nuxia verticillata bark is sometimes added to alcoholic drinks.	Lamiales	Stilbe ericoides
Stylidiaceae (triggerplant family)	Stylidium, from Greek for "little pillar" (the column formed by the style and stamens)	6 genera, in China, the Asian tropics and the Southern Hemisphere	Herbaceous plants, with a few species that are woody at the base. Some species are carnivorous.	Asterales	Stylidium brunonianum
Tetrachondraceae (rustweed family)	Tetrachondra, from Greek for "four-cartilaged"	2 genera, in the Americas and New Zealand	Herbaceous aquatic and marshy perennials with prostrate succulent stems	Lamiales	Tetrachondra hamiltonii
Thomandersiaceae (West-African-bitterbush family)	Thomandersia, for Thomas Anderson (1832–1870)	1 genus, in Central and western Africa	Shrubs, small trees and a few vines, all evergreen. The leaves have antiparasitic properties.	Lamiales	Thomandersia hensii
Torricelliaceae (ivy-palm family)	Torricellia, for Evangelista Torricelli (1608–1647), a physicist and mathematician	3 genera, in Asia and Madagascar	Shrubs and trees with effectively unisexual flowers	Apiales	—
Vahliaceae (flindersbush family)	Vahlia, for Martin Vahl (1749–1804)	1 genus, in the Asian and African tropics	Herbaceous annuals and biennials, sometimes glandular, with stalkless leaves	Vahliales	Vahlia capensis
Verbenaceae (vervain family)	Verbena, a term from Latin for any plants used in some religious ceremonial processions	31 genera, mainly in the Americas	Evergreen and deciduous shrubs, trees, vines and herbaceous plants, often aromatic. Some lemony Aloysia species are used in perfumes, alcoholic drinks and potpourris. Some Lippia species are used as kitchen herbs.	Lamiales	Verbena bonariensis
Viburnaceae (elder family)	Viburnum, from a Latin plant name (previously Adoxaceae)	3 genera, scattered worldwide	Shrubs, some arborescent, and herbaceous perennials. Viburnum and Sambucus are grown as ornamentals.	Dipsacales	Viburnum lantanoides

== See also ==
- List of plant family names with etymologies
