= List of basal asterid families =

Heathlands
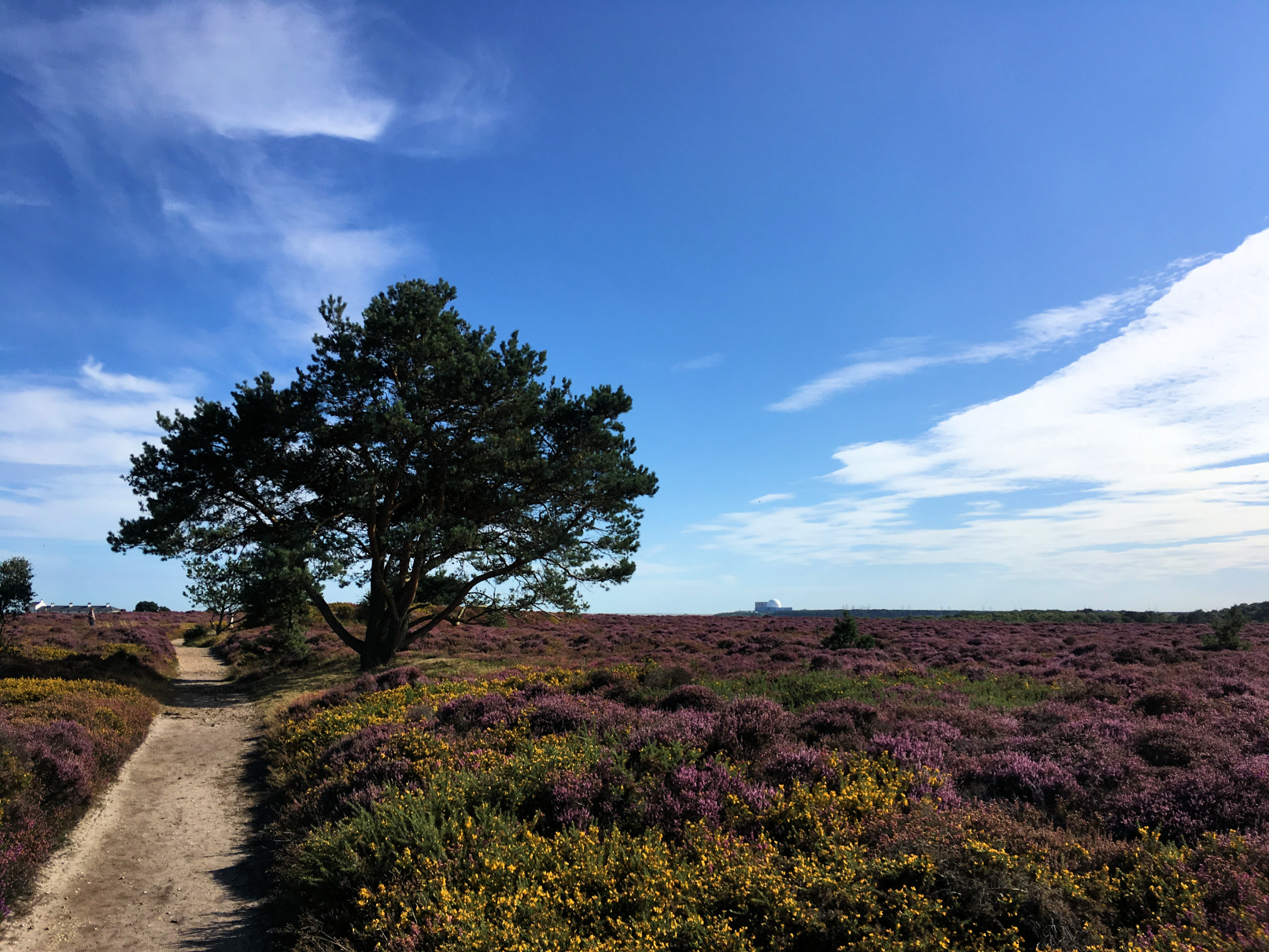
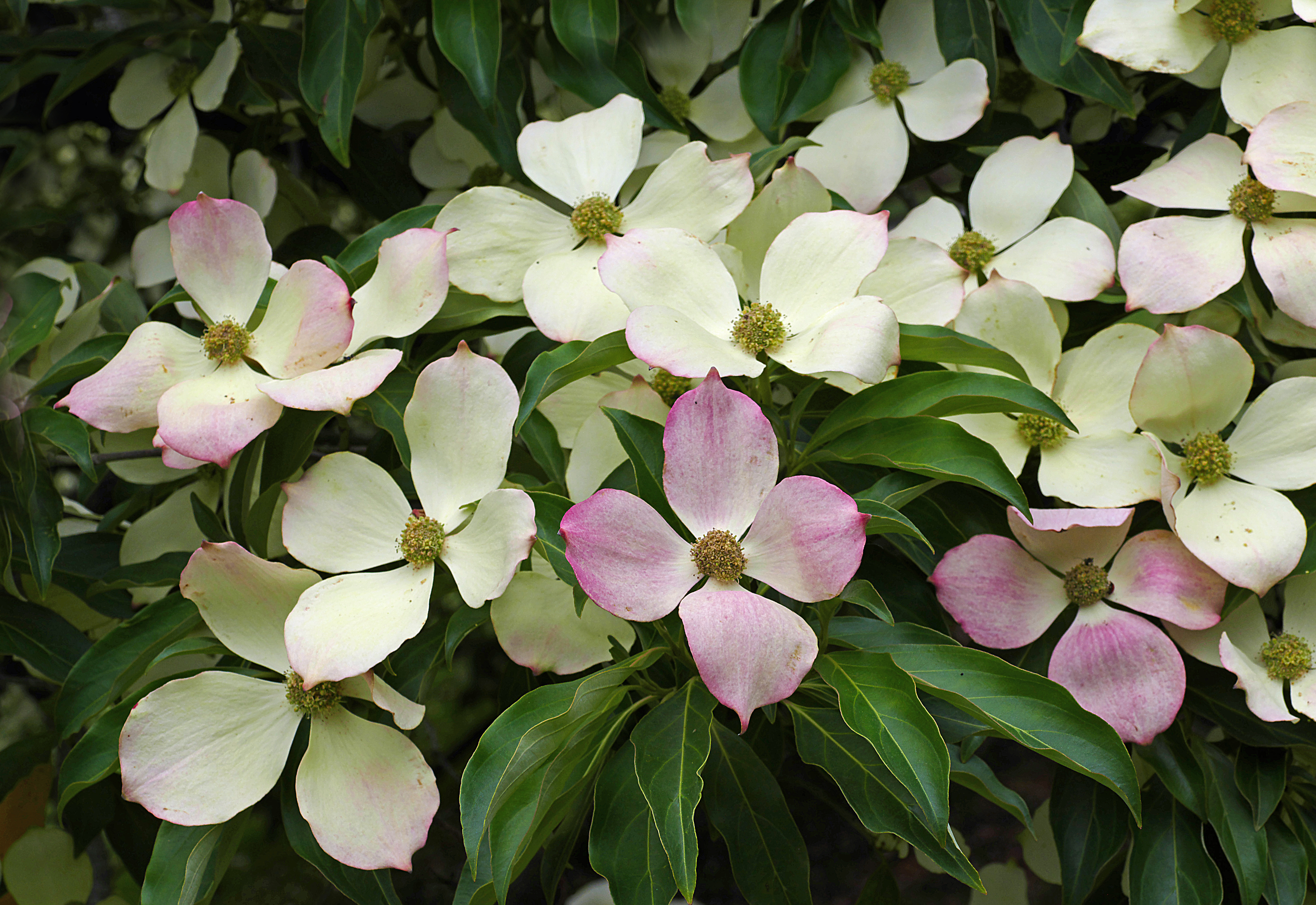
Flowering dogwood

Ericales and Cornales, two orders of flowering plants, are often called the basal asterids. (Note: Since 2019, these two orders have increasingly been identified as a single clade, a group of plants more closely related to each other than to any outside the group.) (Note: The taxonomy (classification) in this list follows Plants of the World (2017) and the fourth Angiosperm Phylogeny Group system. Total counts of genera for each family come from Plants of the World Online. (See the POWO license.) Extinct taxa are not included.) Like most asterids, these species tend to have petals that are fused with each other and with the bases of the stamens, and just one integument (covering) around the embryo sac.

The basal asterids include crops such as blueberries, cranberries, tea and Brazil nuts. Kiwifruit was named for its resemblance to the brown body of the kiwi, a national symbol of New Zealand. Dogwoods (Cornus) are often grown for their showy bracts. Black or white ebony wood is commonly used for musical instruments and carpentry. Many Hydrangea species are popular garden ornamentals.

== Glossary ==
From the glossary of botanical terms:

- annual: a plant species that completes its life cycle within a single year or growing season
- basal: attached close to the base (of a plant or an evolutionary tree diagram)
- deciduous: shedding or falling seasonally, as with bark, leaves, or petals
- herbaceous: not woody; usually green and soft in texture
- mangrove: any shrub or small tree that grows in brackish or salt water
- perennial: not an annual or biennial
- succulent (adjective): juicy or fleshy
- woody: hard and lignified; not herbaceous

The APG IV system is the fourth in a series of plant taxonomies from the Angiosperm Phylogeny Group.

There are a few visible traits that can be linked to many of the families. Most Ericales species tend to have woody stems or branches, seed capsules, cellular endosperm and ladder-like vessel perforations. Species in Cornales tend to have the same perforations, as well as anthers attached at their base, ring-like nectaries, and cymes, which are inflorescences with lateral stalks that terminate in a flower or another branch.

== Families ==
Families
Family and a common name (Note: Each family's formal name ends in the Latin suffix -aceae and is derived from the name of a genus that is or once was part of the family.)	Type genus and etymology (Note: Some plants were named for naturalists (unless otherwise noted).)	Total genera; global distribution	Description and uses	Order	Type genus images
Actinidiaceae (kiwifruit family)	Actinidia, from Greek for "radiating out from the center"	3 genera, mostly in eastern and southern Asia and the tropical Americas	Shrubs, trees and woody vines	Ericales	Actinidia chinensis
Balsaminaceae (balsam family)	Impatiens. Balsamina, an earlier synonym, is from a Latin plant name.	2 genera, scattered worldwide	Perennials and annuals, almost always herbaceous, with succulent stems. Several species are cultivated as ornamentals. Impatiens glandulifera has become invasive in Europe and North America.	Ericales	Impatiens balsamina
Clethraceae (lily-of-the-valley-tree family)	Clethra, from a Greek plant name	2 genera, mostly in the Americas and southeastern Asia	Evergreen and deciduous trees and shrubs. Clethra alnifolia is cultivated for its fragrant flowers.	Ericales	Clethra alnifolia
Cornaceae (dogwood family)	Cornus, from a Latin plant name	2 genera, scattered worldwide	Evergreen and deciduous shrubs, trees and vines, along with rhizomatous herbaceous perennials. The fruits of some species are used in jams or alcoholic drinks. The trees are often grown as ornamentals.	Cornales	Cornus florida
Curtisiaceae (assegai family)	Curtisia, for William Curtis (1746–1799)	1 genus, in South Africa and Zimbabwe	Evergreen trees with stalked leaves. The wood is harvested for furniture-making.	Cornales	Curtisia dentata
Cyrillaceae (leatherwood family)	Cyrilla, for Domenico Cirillo (1739–1799)	2 genera, mostly in the southeastern US; Cyrilla extends into South America.	Usually evergreen trees and shrubs.	Ericales	Cyrilla racemiflora
Diapensiaceae (pincushion-plant family)	Diapensia, from a Greek plant name	6 genera, mostly in eastern Asia and in the US Appalachian Mountains.	Low-growing evergreen herbaceous perennials, sometimes partly woody, often forming ground cover.	Ericales	Diapensia lapponica
Ebenaceae (persimmon family)	Diospyros. Ebenus, an earlier synonym, is from a Greek plant name.	3 genera, mostly in tropical and subtropical lowlands	Mostly evergreen trees and shrubs with clear sap and frequently black hardwood. Diospyros kaki and other fruit species called persimmons are widely grown.	Ericales	Diospyros kaki
Ericaceae (heather family)	Erica, from Greek and Latin plant names	121 genera, found almost worldwide, mostly in temperate zones and the subtropics	Deciduous and evergreen trees, vines, shrubs and herbaceous perennials, growing in soil, on flooded land, on rock and on other plants. The most important commercial crops are in Vaccinium, including blueberries and cranberries. Popular garden plants include Rhododendron.	Ericales	Erica arborea
Fouquieriaceae (ocotillo family)	Fouquieria, for Pierre Fouquier (1776–1850), a physician	1 genus, in Mexico, Texas and Arizona	Spiny shrubs and trees with almost erect, outward-leaning branches. Fouquieria splendens (ocotillo) is a popular North American arid-garden plant.	Ericales	Fouquieria splendens
Grubbiaceae (koolhout family)	Grubbia, for Michael Grubb (1728–1808), a Swedish botanist and mineralogist	1 genus, South Africa	Evergreen and deciduous shrubs with opposite leaves.	Cornales	Grubbia rosmarinifolia
Hydrangeaceae (hortensia family)	Hydrangea, from Greek for "water jar", which the fruit resembles	9 genera, with centers of diversity in temperate North America, mountainous Europe and East Asia	Deciduous and evergreen shrubs, small trees, woody vines and herbaceous plants. Hydrangea macrophylla has been cultivated in Japan for millennia.	Cornales	Hydrangea macrophylla
Hydrostachyaceae (waterspike family)	Hydrostachys, from Greek for "water spike"	1 genus, in Madagascar and tropical and southern Africa	Submerged scaly herbaceous perennials with a disc-shaped stem that clings to rocks in rapids.	Cornales	Hydrostachys imbricata
Lecythidaceae (cannonball-tree family)	Lecythis, from Greek for "oil pot", which the fruit resembles	24 genera, scattered throughout the tropics.	Shrubs and trees, sometimes up to 55 m (180 ft) high. Of various edible seeds and nuts, the most important commercially is the Brazil nut. Several species provide timber.	Ericales	Lecythis pisonis
Loasaceae (blazingstar family)	Loasa, probably from a South American plant name	21 genera, mostly in the Americas	Shrubs, woody vines, small trees and herbaceous plants. Several species are used in traditional medicine in the Andes.	Cornales	Loasa acerifolia
Marcgraviaceae (shingle-vine family)	Marcgravia, for Georg Marcgrave (1610–1644)	7 genera, in the tropics of the Americas	Shrubs, vines and occasionally small trees that grow in soil and on other plants.	Ericales	Marcgravia rectiflora
Mitrastemonaceae (nippledaisy family)	Mitrastemon, from Greek for "miter stamen"	1 genus, in Central America, Colombia and tropical Asia	Mushroom-like parasites without chlorophyll that feed on tree roots.	Ericales	Mitrastemon yamamotoi
Nyssaceae (tupelo-tree family)	Nyssa, for Nysa, a water nymph of Greek myth	5 genera, southern and southeastern Asia, and North and Central America	Deciduous and evergreen trees. Nyssa ogeche (ogeechee lime) is sometimes used in preserves and jams, and tupelo is harvested for wood.	Cornales	Nyssa ogeche
Pentaphylacaceae (saintedwood family)	Pentaphylax, from Greek for "five guardians"	13 genera, mostly spread across the American and Asian tropics, with some in temperate zones.	Evergreen shrubs and trees with stalked leaves. Anneslea fragrans produces wood with attractive grain markings.	Ericales	Ternstroemia gymnanthera
Polemoniaceae (Jacob's-ladder family)	Polemonium, from a Greek plant name	27 genera, mostly in western North America	Mostly herbaceous annuals and perennials, with some small trees and shrubs. Some species have been used as a soap substitute by Native Americans. Cantua buxifolia is the national flower of Peru.	Ericales	Polemonium caeruleum
Primulaceae (primrose family)	Primula, from a Medieval Latin plant name	57 genera, in northern temperate and arctic zones, mainly	Trees, shrubs, mangroves, vines and herbaceous plants. Many genera are cultivated as ornamentals, including Androsace (rock jasmine) and various plants called primroses.	Ericales	Primula vulgaris
Roridulaceae (flycatcher-bush family)	Roridula, from Latin "little" and Greek "dewy"	1 genus, in southwest South Africa	Evergreen shrubs that trap insects.	Ericales	Roridula dentata
Sapotaceae (sapodilla family)	Manilkara. Sapota, an earlier synonym, is from Nahuatl for "soft fruit".	62 genera, scattered in the humid tropics worldwide	Latex-bearing shrubs, trees and woody vines. Manilkara zapota (sapodilla) and Chrysophyllum cainito (star apple) are widely cultivated fruits.	Ericales	Manilkara zapota
Sarraceniaceae (American-pitcherplant family)	Sarracenia, for Michel Sarrazin (1659–1736)	3 genera, in the Americas	Carnivorous, usually herbaceous perennials with underground rhizomes. The tubes (modified leaves) attract, trap and digest tiny animals. Some of these plants are grown in bog gardens.	Ericales	Sarracenia leucophylla
Sladeniaceae (ribfruit family)	Sladenia, for Edward Bosc Sladen (1827–1890), an army officer	2 genera, in southeastern Asia and eastern Africa	Evergreen trees with stalked leaves.	Ericales	Sladenia celastrifolia
Styracaceae (storax family)	Styrax, from Arabic and Greek plant names	12 genera, mainly in the Americas and Asia	Deciduous and evergreen shrubs and trees. The pharmaceutical resin benzoin is harvested from Styrax.	Ericales	Styrax obassia
Symplocaceae (sweetleaf family)	Symplocos, from Greek for "a combining" (of the stamens)	1 genus, in parts of eastern Asia, Oceania and the Americas	Usually evergreen shrubs and trees. The bark or leaves of some species are used in the preparation of dyes in Indonesia.	Ericales	Symplocos paniculata
Tetrameristaceae (punah family)	Tetramerista, from Greek for "four parts" (describing only Tetramerista flowers)	3 genera, with Tetramerista in Southeast Asia and the others in Central and South America	Shrubs, trees and mangroves with fluted trunks. Tetramerista is harvested for wood, and has edible fruit.	Ericales	Pelliciera rhizophorae
Theaceae (tea family)	Camellia. Thea, an earlier synonym, is from a Chinese plant name.	8 genera, scattered in the northern temperate zones and the tropics	Usually evergreen shrubs and trees. Tea (from Camellia sinensis) has been brewed in China for over 2000 years. Camellia, Franklinia, Gordonia and Stewartia are common garden ornamentals.	Ericales	Camellia sinensis

== See also ==
- List of plant family names with etymologies
