= Sladenia integrifolia =

Scientific classification
- Kingdom: Plantae
- Clade: Tracheophytes
- Clade: Angiosperms
- Clade: Eudicots
- Clade: Asterids
- Order: Ericales
- Family: Sladeniaceae
- Genus: Sladenia
- Species: S. integrifolia

Binomial name
- Sladenia integrifolia Y. M. Shui 2002

Species of tree

Sladenia integrifolia is a species of tree in the family Sladeniaceae found in southern Yunnan, China. Its type locality is Zhemi Township (Chinese: 者米乡), Jinping Miao, Yao, and Dai Autonomous County, southern Yunnan, China.

== Description ==
It is found in secondary evergreen forests at 1000–1300 m above sea level. Sladenia integrifolia flowers from March to June. Fruiting occurs from July to December.
