= Gillian Perry =

Gillian Perry may refer to:

- Gillian Perry (botanist) (1943–2011), Australian botanist
- Gill Perry (fl. 1968), British art historian
