= Ficalhoa =

Conservation status
- Least Concern (IUCN 3.1)

Scientific classification
- Kingdom: Plantae
- Clade: Tracheophytes
- Clade: Angiosperms
- Clade: Eudicots
- Clade: Asterids
- Order: Ericales
- Family: Sladeniaceae
- Genus: Ficalhoa; Hiern
- Species: F. laurifolia

Binomial name
- Ficalhoa laurifolia Hiern, 1898

Genus of flowering plants

Ficalhoa is a genus with only one species, Ficalhoa laurifolia, an evergreen flowering tree of 2–6 m (6.6–19.7 ft) height with glabrous branches. Its bark is roughly fissured and produces white latex. Its leathery leaves on 3–9 mm (0.12–0.35 in) long petioles are lanceolate, rounded at the base, 5–12 cm (2.0–4.7 in) long and 1–3 cm (0.39–1.18 in) wide. Its white, yellowish or greenish flowers have oblong small petals and rounded sepals.

In the Udzungwa Mountains it grows at elevations of 1,200–1,800 m (3,900–5,900 ft) in association with Aphloia theiformis, Englerophytum magalismontanum, Cryptocarya liebertiana, Hirtella megacarpa, Isoberlinia scheffleri, Myrsine melanophloeos, Xylopia aethiopica and Xymalos monospora. It is among the most common tree species in the Rwenzori Mountains at elevations of 1,300–2,000 m (4,300–6,600 ft). In Virunga National Park it grows in Afromontane forest between 1,800 and 2,800 m (5,900 and 9,200 ft) elevation.
