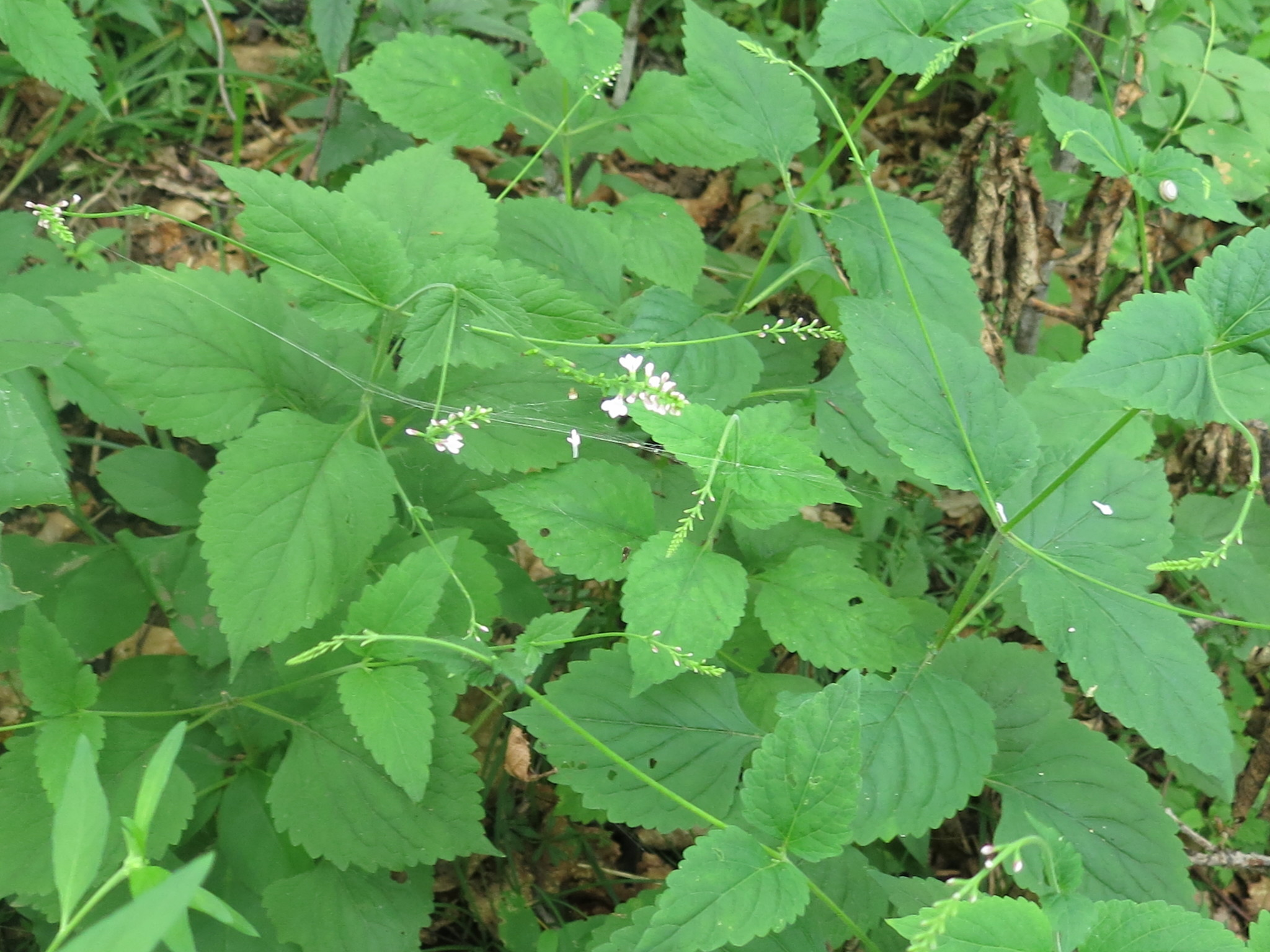

Scientific classification
- Kingdom: Plantae
- Clade: Tracheophytes
- Clade: Angiosperms
- Clade: Eudicots
- Clade: Asterids
- Order: Lamiales
- Family: Phrymaceae
- Genus: Phryma
- Species: P. oblongifolia

Binomial name
- Phryma oblongifolia Koidz.

Synonyms
- Phryma humilis Koidz.; Phryma leptostachya var. humilis (Koidz.) H.Hara; Phryma leptostachya var. oblongifolia (Koidz.) Honda

= Phryma oblongifolia =

Species of flowering plant

Phryma oblongifolia is a species of flowering plant in the family Phrymaceae, native from temperate Asia southwards to the Himalayas and north Vietnam. It was first described by Gen-ichi Koidzumi in 1929. Its status as a separate species was not usually accepted, and it was treated as a variety of Phryma leptostachya. In 2014, the distinctiveness of North American P. leptostachya and Asian P. oblongifolia was supported, based on morphological evidence and a previous molecular phylogenetic study. As of April 2022, the species is recognized by Plants of the World Online.
