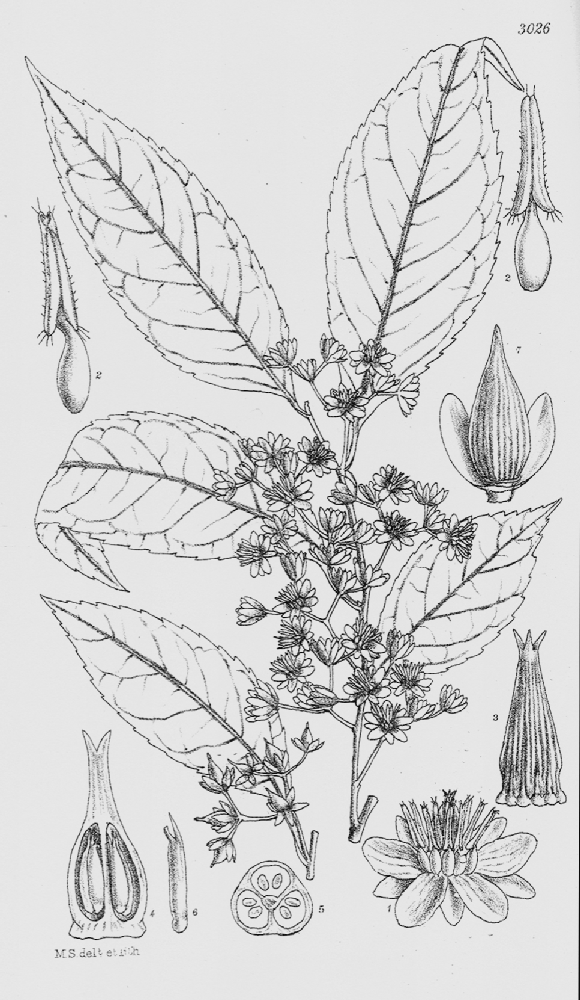
- Sladenia celastrifolia

Scientific classification
- Kingdom: Plantae
- Clade: Tracheophytes
- Clade: Angiosperms
- Clade: Eudicots
- Clade: Asterids
- Order: Ericales
- Family: Sladeniaceae
- Genus: Sladenia; Kurz

Species
- Sladenia celastrifolia; Sladenia integrifolia

= Sladenia (plant) =

Family of flowering plants

Sladenia is a genus of flowering plants containing tree species in the family Sladeniaceae. It is found in Indo-China.

== Species ==
There are two species in the genus Sladenia.

- Sladenia celastrifolia
- Sladenia integrifolia
