= H. imbricata =

H. imbricata may refer to:

- Himantura imbricata, the scaly whipray, a skate species found in the tropical Indo-West Pacific oceans from the Red Sea and Mauritius to Indonesia
- Hydrostachys imbricata, a flowering plant species

== See also ==
- Imbricata
