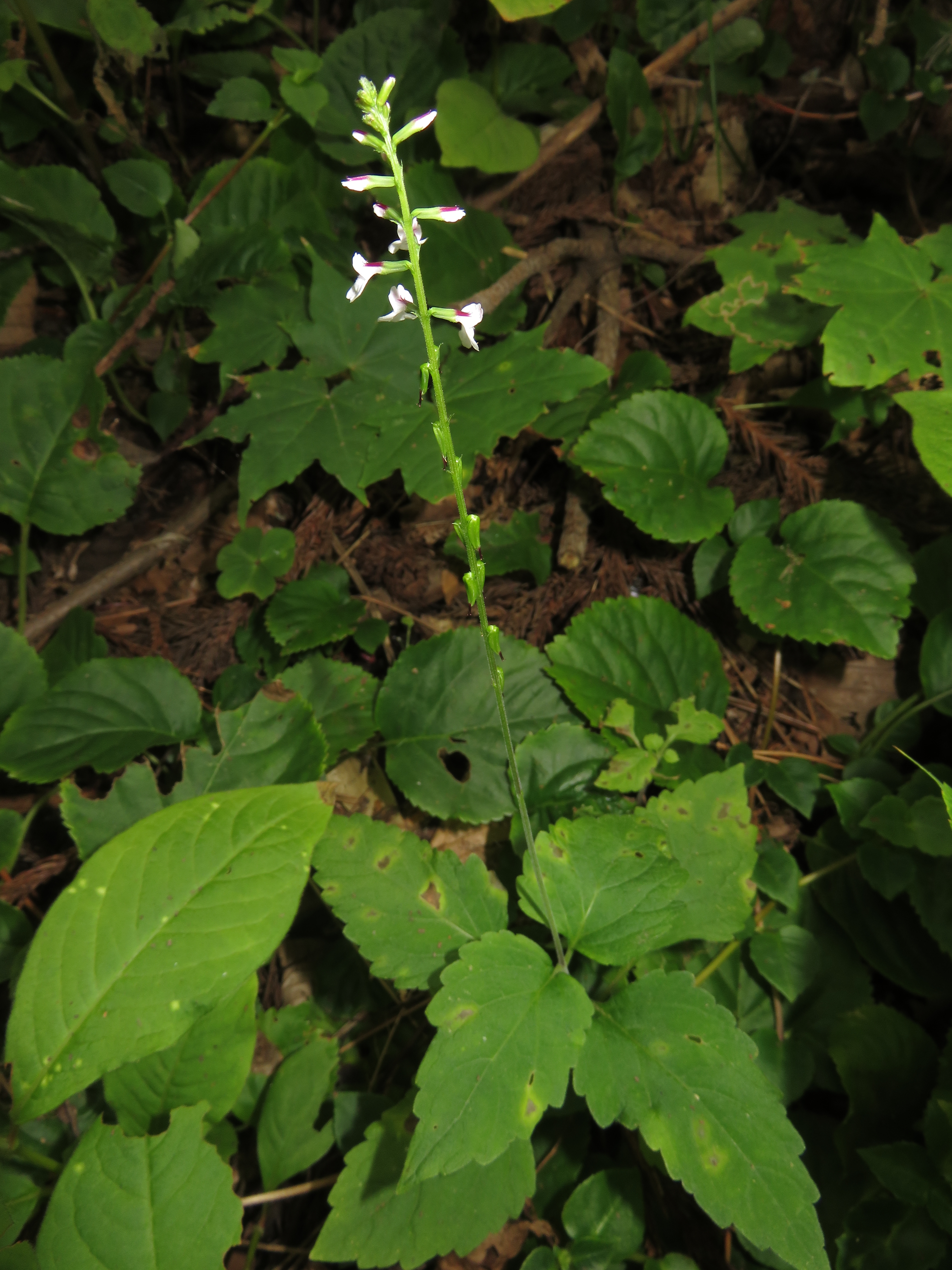

Scientific classification
- Kingdom: Plantae
- Clade: Tracheophytes
- Clade: Angiosperms
- Clade: Eudicots
- Clade: Asterids
- Order: Lamiales
- Family: Phrymaceae
- Genus: Phryma
- Species: P. nana

Binomial name
- Phryma nana Koidz.

Synonyms
- Phryma asiatica (H.Hara) O.Deg. & I.Deg.; Phryma leptostachya subsp. asiatica H.Hara) Kitam.; Phryma leptostachya var. asiatica H.Hara; Phryma leptostachya var. nana (Koidz.) H.Hara

= Phryma nana =

Species of flowering plant

Phryma nana is a species of flowering plant in the family Phrymaceae, native to Japan. It was first described by the Japanese botanist Gen-ichi Koidzumi in 1939. Its status as a separate species was not usually accepted, and it was treated as a subspecies or variety of Phryma leptostachya. In 2016, the distinctiveness of the Japanese P. nana was again supported, based on both earlier molecular phylogenetic analysis and morphological analysis. As of April 2022, the species is recognized by Plants of the World Online.
