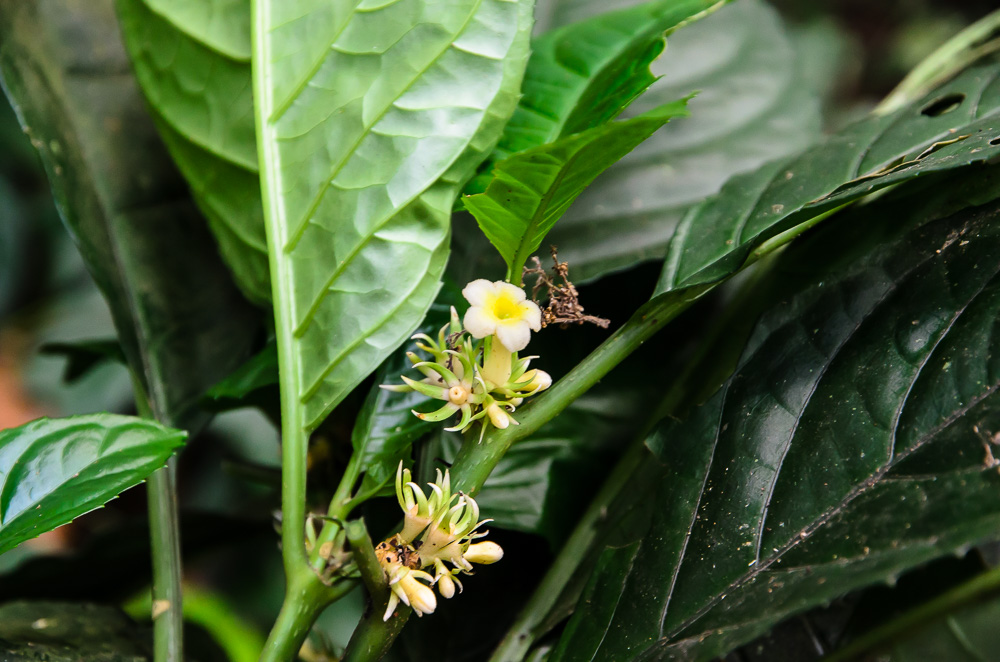
- Silvianthus bracteatus

Scientific classification
- Kingdom: Plantae
- Clade: Tracheophytes
- Clade: Angiosperms
- Clade: Eudicots
- Clade: Asterids
- Order: Lamiales
- Family: Carlemanniaceae
- Genus: Silvianthus; Hook.f.

Species
- See text

Synonyms
- Quiducia Gagnep.

= Silvianthus =

Genus of Carlemanniaceae plants

Silvianthus is a genus of flowering plants in the family Carlemanniaceae, found in Bangladesh, the eastern Himalaya, south-central China, and Indochina. Thought to be in the order Lamiales, they have a chromosome count of 2n=38.

== Species ==
Currently accepted species include:

- Silvianthus bracteatus Hook.f.
- Silvianthus tonkinensis (Gagnep.) Ridsdale
