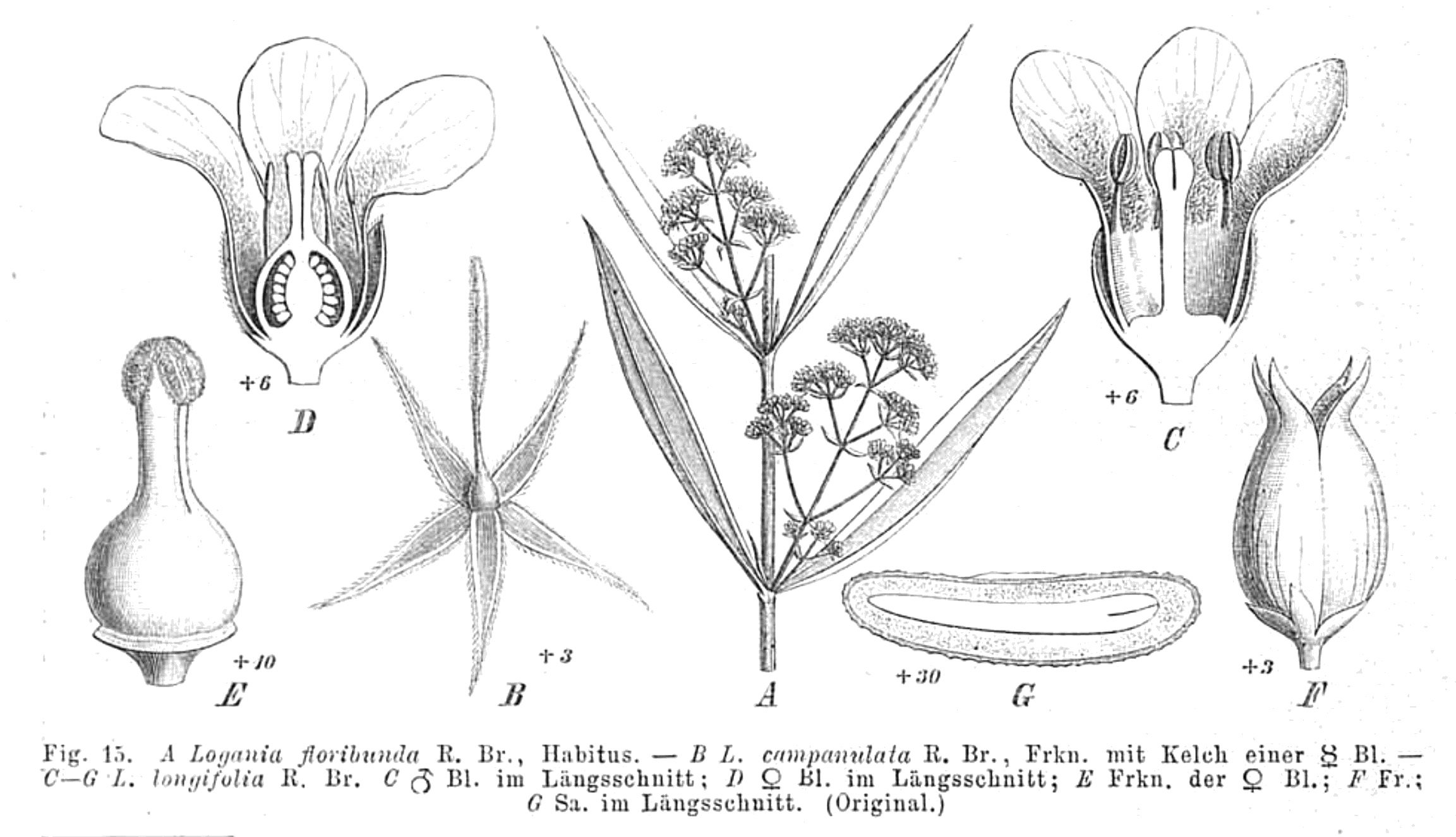

Scientific classification
- Kingdom: Plantae
- Clade: Tracheophytes
- Clade: Angiosperms
- Clade: Eudicots
- Clade: Asterids
- Order: Gentianales
- Family: Loganiaceae
- Genus: Logania; R.Br., 1810

= Logania =

Genus of plants

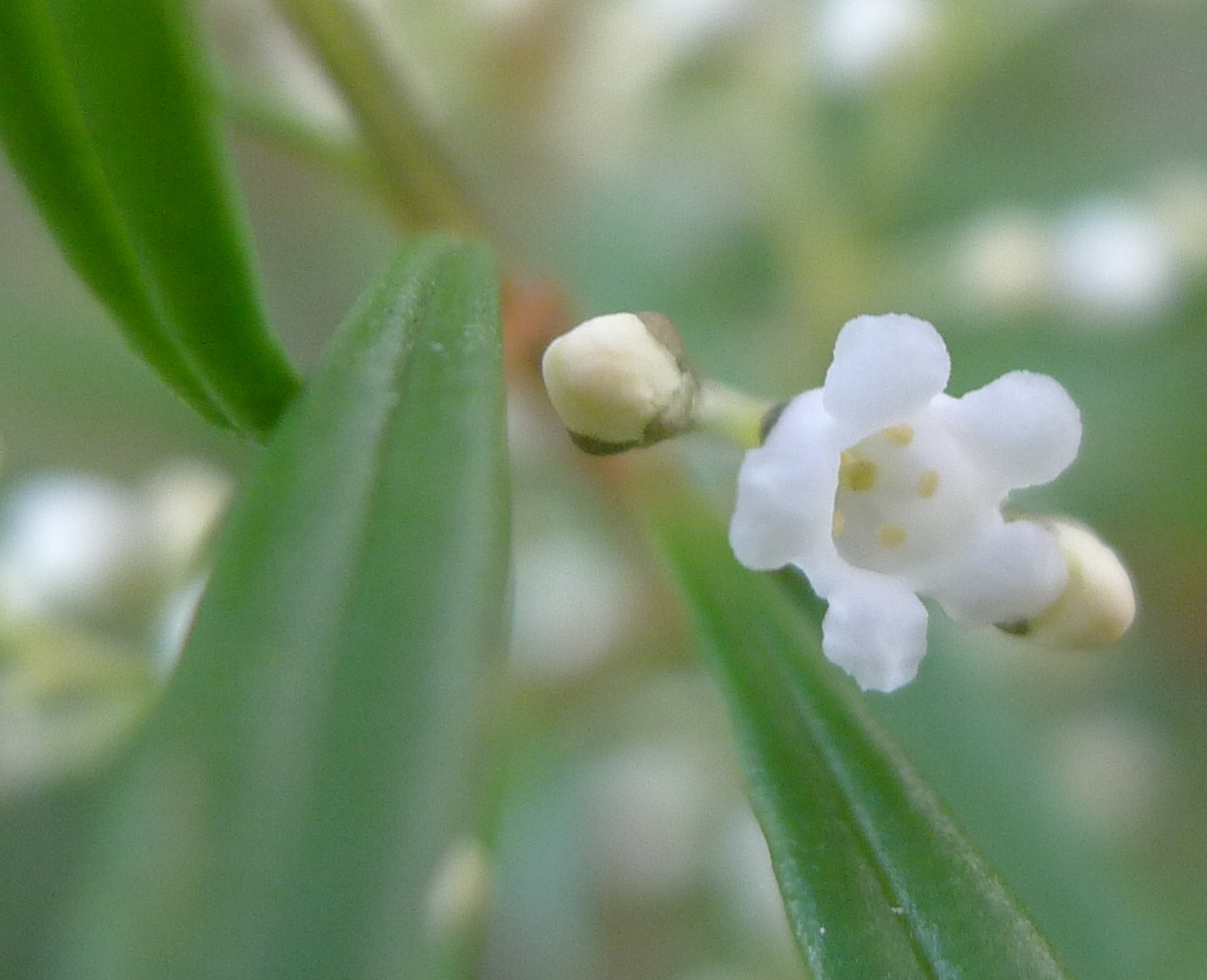
Logania albiflora

Logania is a genus of plants belonging to the family Loganiaceae. Native to Australia and New Zealand, the genus includes at least 24 species including herbs, shrubs, trees and climbers.

Species include:

- Logania albiflora (Andrews) Druce
- Logania archeri B.J.Conn
- Logania biloba B.J.Conn
- Logania buxifolia F.Muell.
- Logania callosa F.Muell.
- Logania campanulata R.Br.
- Logania centralis B.J.Conn
- Logania cordifolia Hook.
- Logania crassifolia R.Br.
- Logania diffusa R.J.F.Hend.
- Logania exilis B.J.Conn
- Logania fasciculata R.Br.
- Logania flaviflora F.Muell.
- Logania insularis J.M.Black
- Logania judithiana B.J.Conn
- Logania linifolia Schltdl. - flax-leaf logania
- Logania litoralis B.J.Conn
- Logania micrantha Benth.
- Logania minor (J.M.Black) B.J.Conn
- Logania nanophylla B.J.Conn
- Logania nuda F.Muell. - bare logania
- Logania ovata R.Br. oval-leaf logania
- Logania perryana B.J.Conn
- Logania pusilla R.Br.
- Logania recurva J.M.Black
- Logania saxatilis G.Perry ex B.J.Conn
- Logania scabrella B.J.Conn
- Logania serpyllifolia R.Br.
- Logania spermacocea F.Muell.
- Logania stenophylla F.Muell.
- Logania tortuosa D.A.Herb.
- Logania vaginalis (Labill.) F.Muell.
- Logania wendyae Cranfield & Keighery
