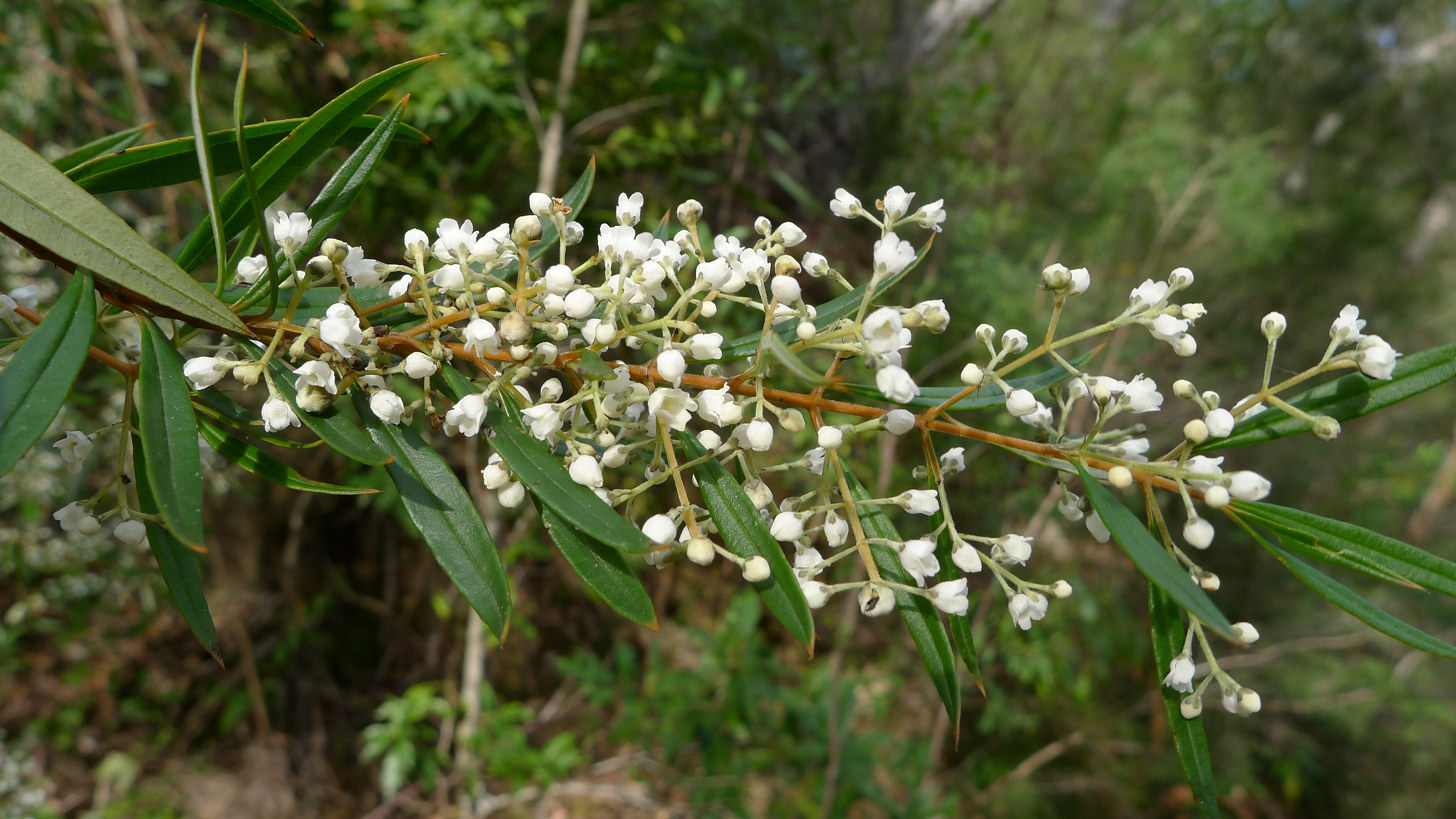
- near Heathcote Road, Sydney

Scientific classification
- Kingdom: Plantae
- Clade: Tracheophytes
- Clade: Angiosperms
- Clade: Eudicots
- Clade: Asterids
- Order: Gentianales
- Family: Loganiaceae
- Genus: Logania
- Species: L. albiflora

Binomial name
- Logania albiflora (Andrews) Druce
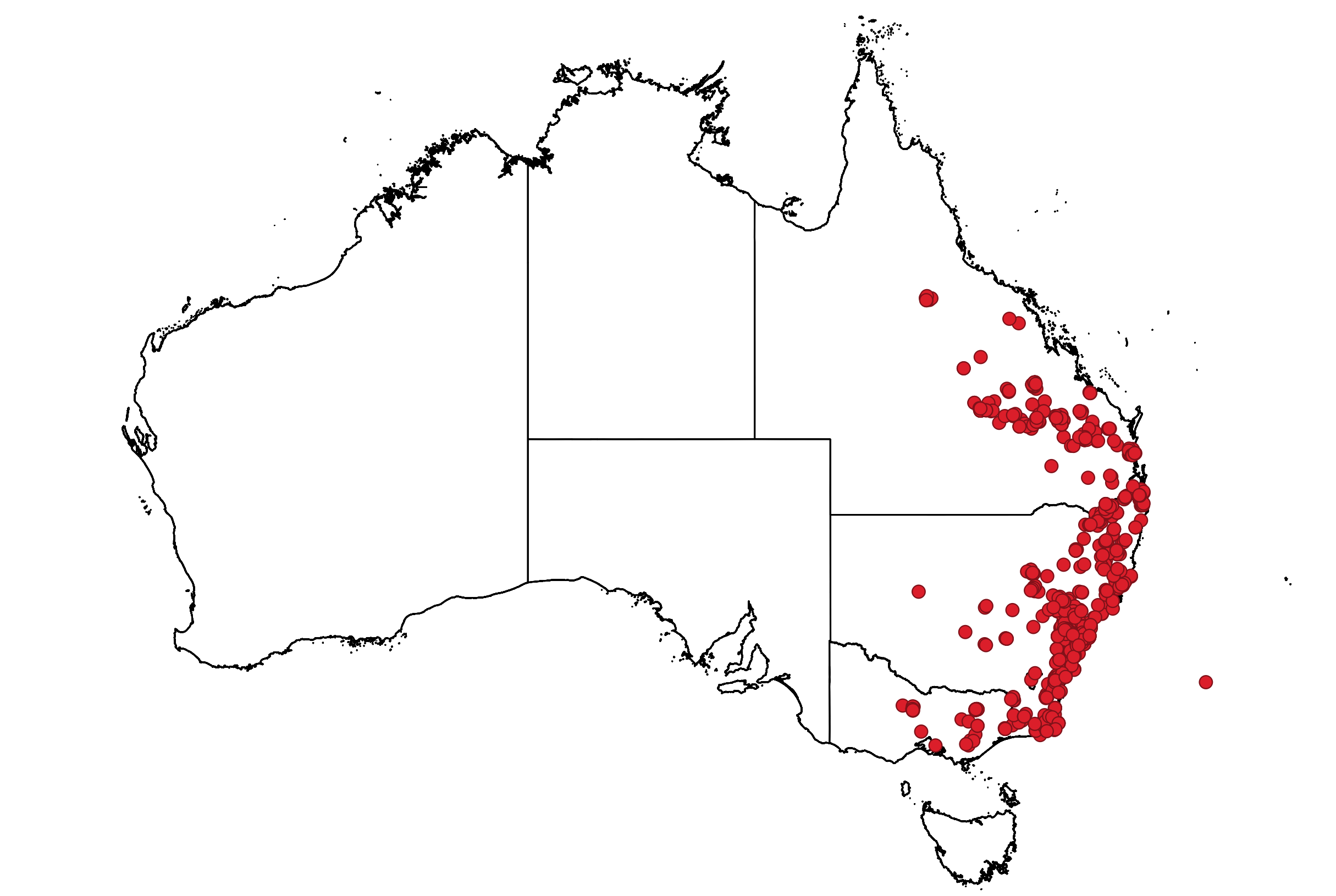
- Occurrence data from AVH

= Logania albiflora =

Species of plant

Logania albiflora is a shrub found in eastern Australia. Despite being uncommon, it may be found in a variety of different forest and woodland habitats. The genus was named after James Logan. The specific epithet refers to the very fragrant white flowers.

== Gallery ==
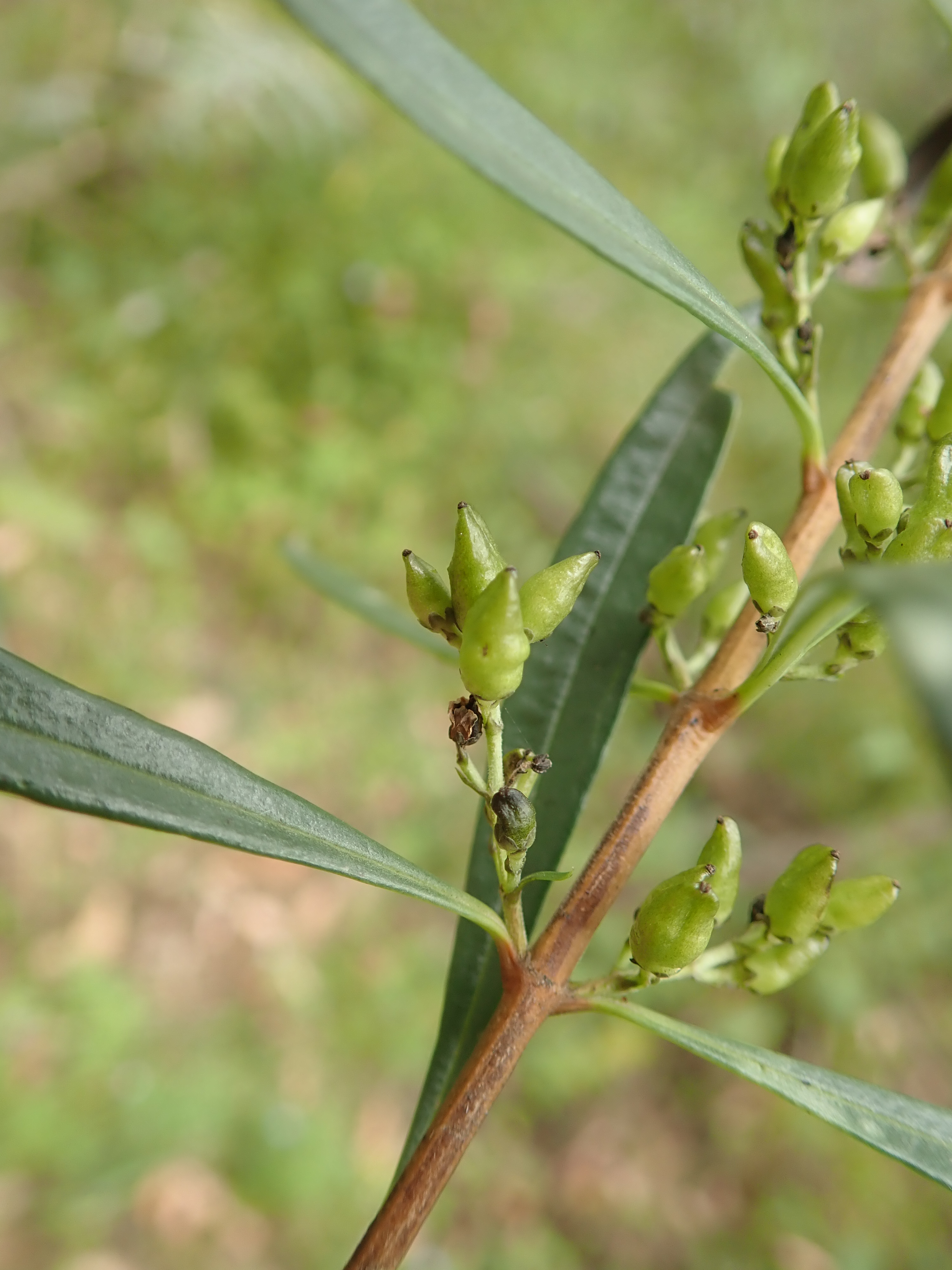
Developing fruit
