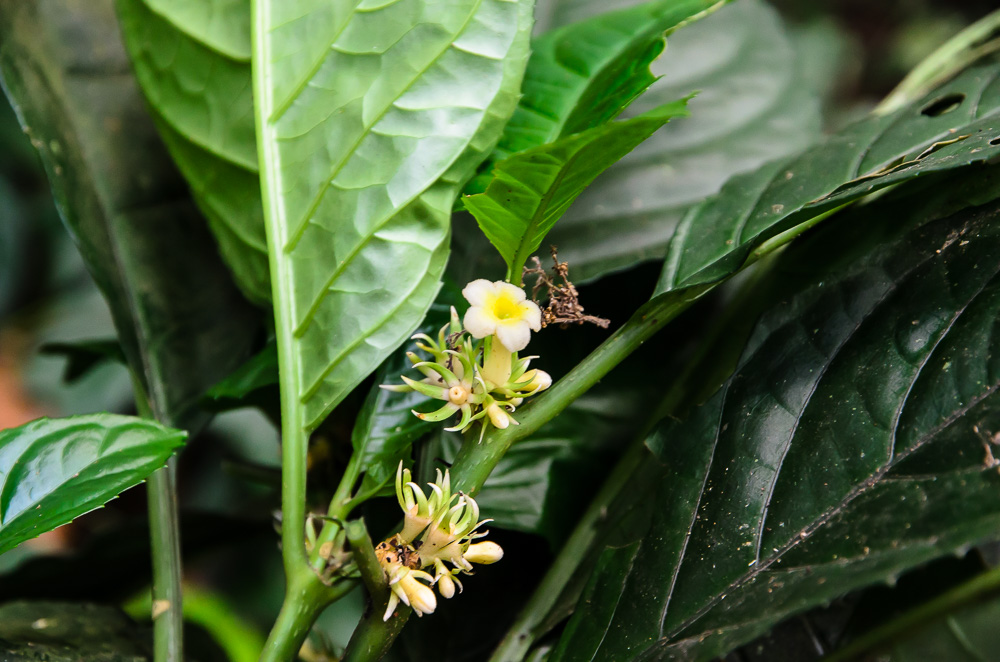
- Silvianthus bracteatus

Scientific classification
- Kingdom: Plantae
- Clade: Tracheophytes
- Clade: Angiosperms
- Clade: Eudicots
- Clade: Asterids
- Order: Lamiales
- Family: Carlemanniaceae; Airy Shaw

Type genus
- Carlemannia Benth.

Genera
- Carlemannia; Silvianthus

= Carlemanniaceae =

Family of flowering plants

The Carlemanniaceae are a tropical East Asian and Southeast Asian family of subshrub to herbaceous perennial flowering plants with 2 genera. Older systems of plant taxonomy place the two genera, Carlemannia, and Silvianthus within the Caprifoliaceae or the Rubiaceae. The Angiosperm Phylogeny Group classification of 2003 places the group in the Lamiales, as a plant family more closely related to the Oleaceae than to the Caprifoliaceae.
