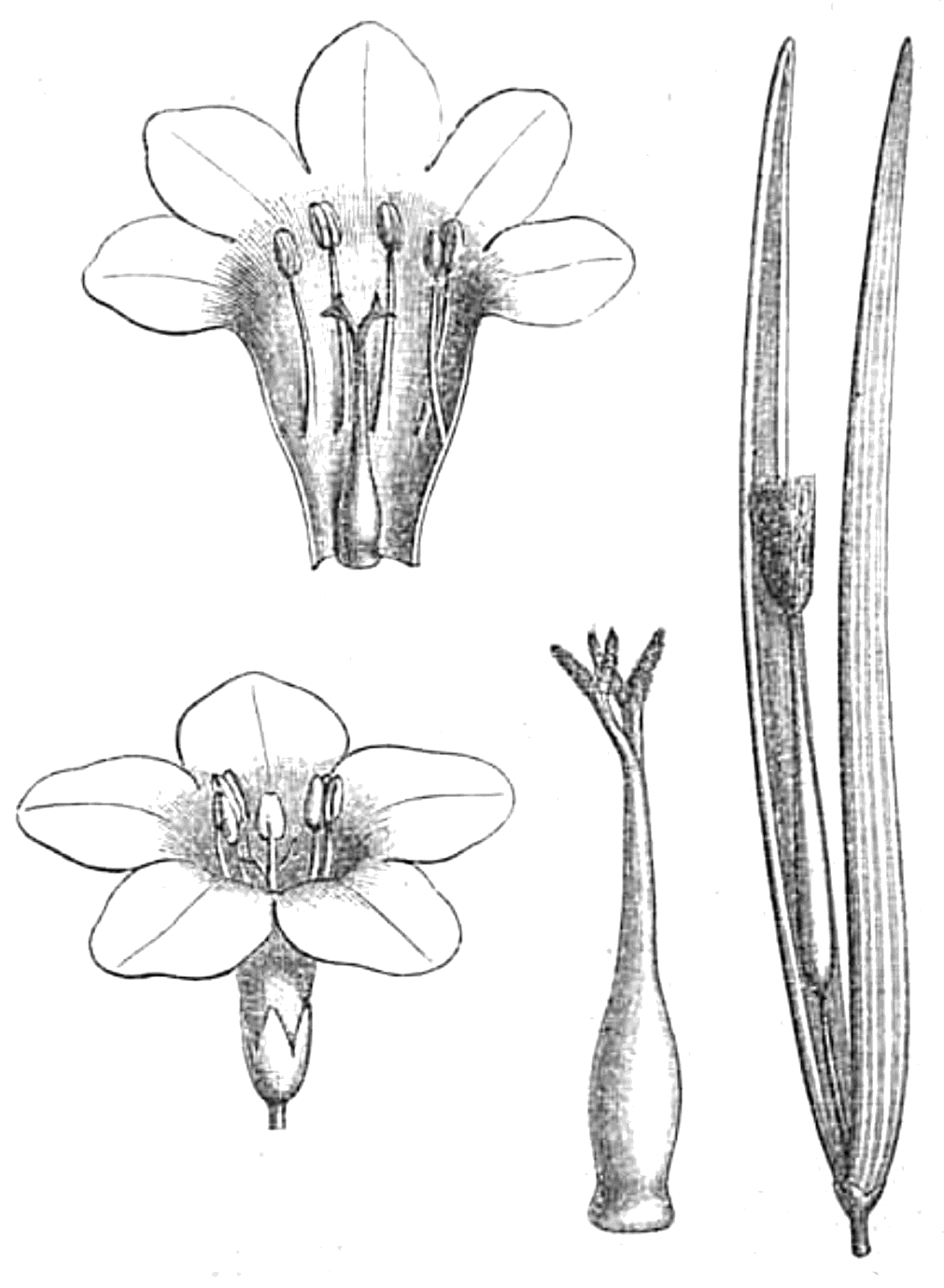

Scientific classification
- Kingdom: Plantae
- Clade: Tracheophytes
- Clade: Angiosperms
- Clade: Eudicots
- Clade: Asterids
- Order: Lamiales
- Family: Plocospermataceae; Hutch.
- Genus: Plocosperma; Benth.
- Species: P. buxifolium

Binomial name
- Plocosperma buxifolium Benth.

= Plocosperma =

Genus of flowering plants

Plocosperma is the sole genus in the Plocospermataceae, a family of flowering plants. The genus contains a single species, Plocosperma buxifolium.
