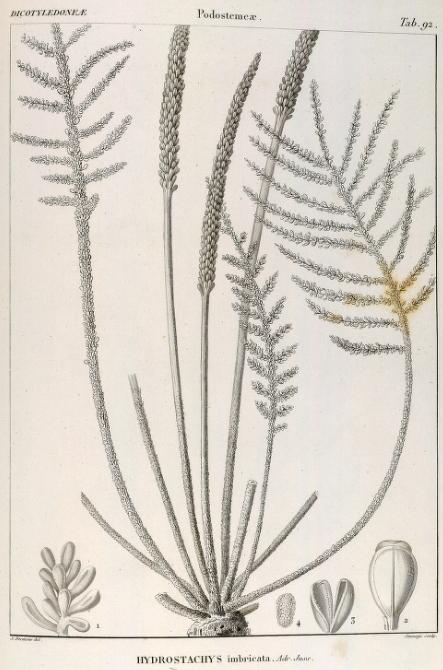
- Hydrostachys imbricata

Scientific classification
- Kingdom: Plantae
- Clade: Tracheophytes
- Clade: Angiosperms
- Clade: Eudicots
- Clade: Asterids
- Order: Cornales
- Family: Hydrostachyaceae; Engl.
- Genus: Hydrostachys; Thouars

Species
- Approximately 22; see text.

= Hydrostachys =

Genus of flowering plants

Hydrostachys is a genus of about 22 species of flowering plants native to Madagascar and southern and central Africa. It is the only genus in the family Hydrostachyaceae. All species of Hydrostachys are aquatic, growing on rocks in fast-moving water. They have tuberous roots, usually pinnately compound leaves, and highly reduced flowers borne on dense spikes.

The phylogenetic placement of Hydrostachys is particularly problematic. Owing to its specialized aquatic morphology, it has often been grouped with other aquatic plants, such as those in the family Podostemaceae. However, embryological, floral, and other morphological characters do not support this placement, and molecular data suggest that Hydrostachys is related to taxa in the order Cornales. Its position within Cornales remains uncertain; it may be basal to the rest of the order or may fall within the family Hydrangeaceae. It shares few morphological similarities with other members of Cornales.

== Species ==
(This list may be incomplete.)

- Hydrostachys decaryi
- Hydrostachys distichophylla
- Hydrostachys fimbriata
- Hydrostachys imbricata
- Hydrostachys laciniata
- Hydrostachys longifida
- Hydrostachys maxima
- Hydrostachys monoica
- Hydrostachys multifida
- Hydrostachys perrieri
- Hydrostachys plumosa
- Hydrostachys stolonifera
- Hydrostachys trifaria
- Hydrostachys verruculosa
