= Sladenia celastrifolia =

Conservation status
- Least Concern (IUCN 3.1)

Scientific classification
- Kingdom: Plantae
- Clade: Tracheophytes
- Clade: Angiosperms
- Clade: Eudicots
- Clade: Asterids
- Order: Ericales
- Family: Sladeniaceae
- Genus: Sladenia
- Species: S. celastrifolia

Binomial name
- Sladenia celastrifolia Kurz

Species of tree

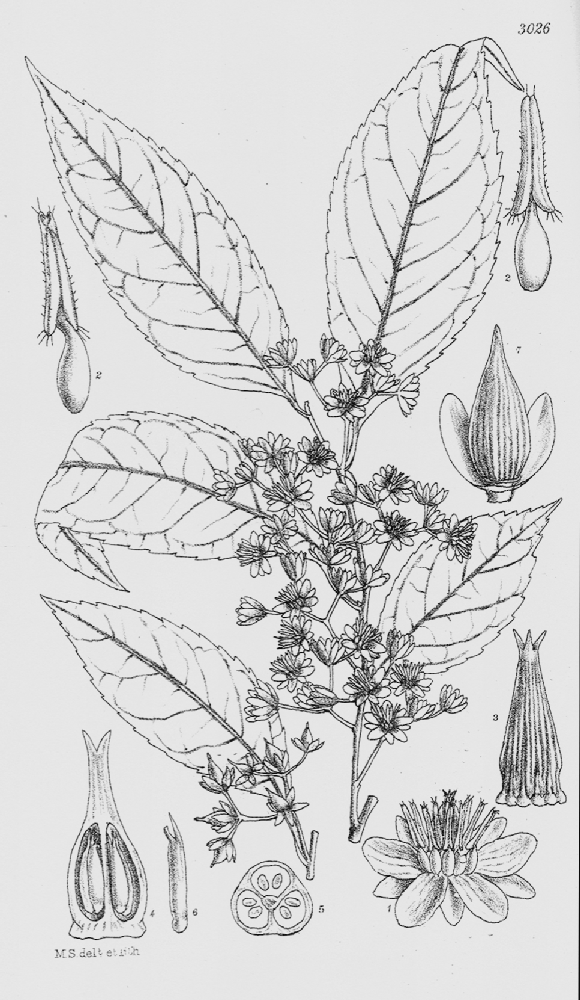
Sladenia celastrifolia

Sladenia celastrifolia is a species of tree in the family Sladeniaceae. It is found in southwestern China (Yunnan and Guizhou), Thailand, and Myanmar.
