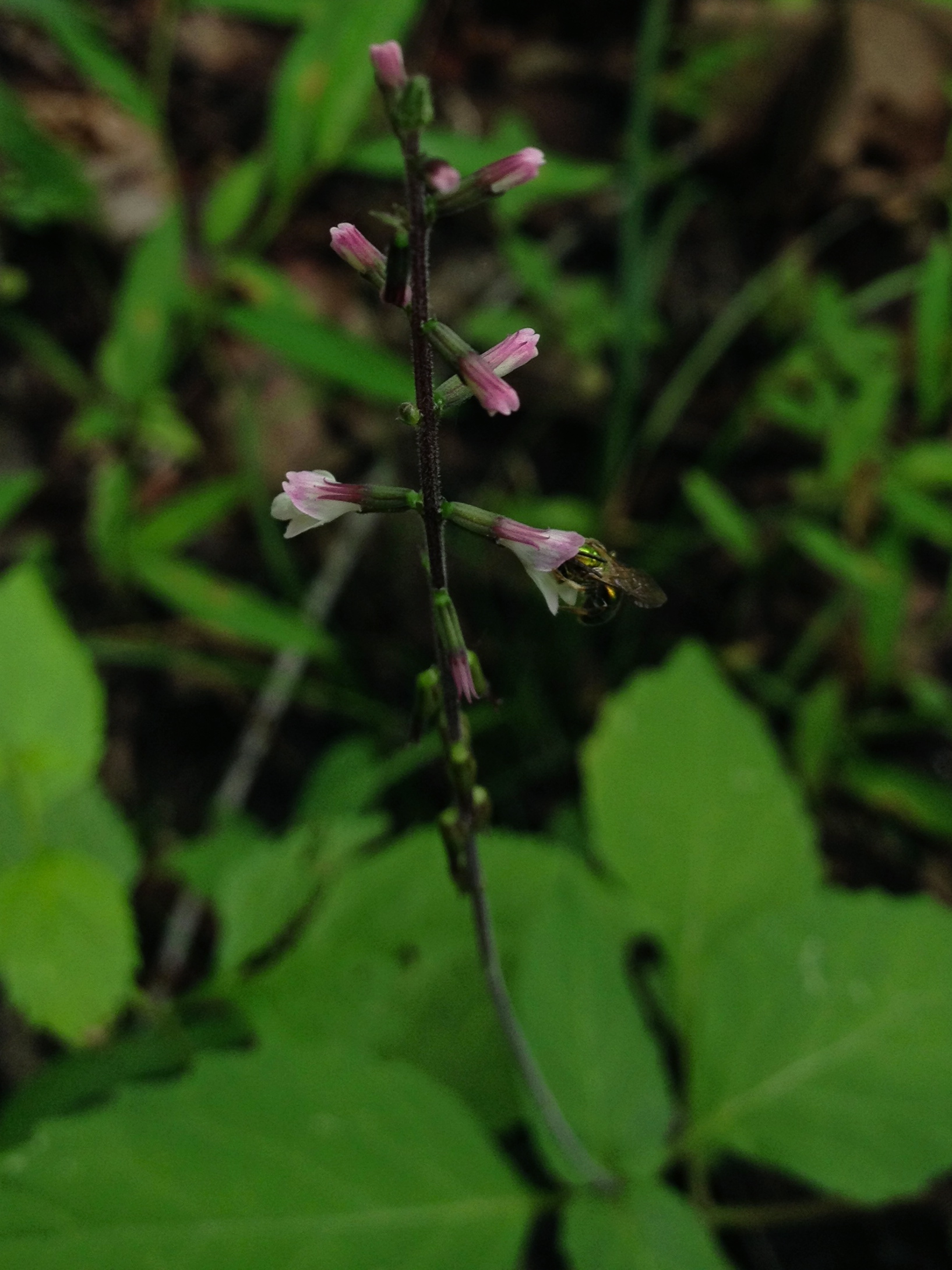
- Phryma leptostachya

Scientific classification
- Kingdom: Plantae
- Clade: Tracheophytes
- Clade: Angiosperms
- Clade: Eudicots
- Clade: Asterids
- Order: Lamiales
- Family: Phrymaceae
- Genus: Phryma; L.

Species
- See text.

Synonyms
- Leptostachia Mitch.

= Phryma =

Genus of plants

Phryma is a genus of flowering plant in the family Phrymaceae, native to temperate Asia and eastern North America.

== Taxonomy ==
The genus Phryma was erected by Carl Linnaeus in 1753 with the sole species Phryma leptostachya. The Japanese botanist Gen-ichi Koidzumi proposed separating Asian populations, into Phryma oblongifolia in 1929 and further into Phryma nana in 1939. However, these species were generally not accepted, and populations in Asia and North America were usually treated as the single species Phryma leptostachya, being distinguished only at the rank of subspecies and variety. In 2014, it was again proposed to separate Asian and North American populations into full species, P. oblongifolia and P. leptostachya respectively. In 2016, Japanese populations were again separated into P. oblongifolia and P. nana. All three species are accepted by Plants of the World Online, as of April 2022, although other sources may continue to use a single species with only intraspecific divisions. In lieu of the critical examination of Asian populations outside Japan (India, China, Korea, Russia), the application of the names based on Japanese material to continental populations remains unclear; most botanists still consider these populations to represent P. leptostachya.

The genus Phryma has sometimes been classified in the family Verbenaceae, 21st century research has placed it in the small family Phrymaceae, along with Mimulus (monkey flowers) and a small number of other genera which had formerly been in the Scrophulariaceae.

=== Species ===
As of April 2022, Plants of the World Online accepted the following species:

- Phryma leptostachya L. – eastern North America (roughly, everywhere east of the Rocky Mountains)
- Phryma nana Koidz. – Japan
- Phryma oblongifolia Koidz. – from temperate Asia (including Japan) south to north Vietnam
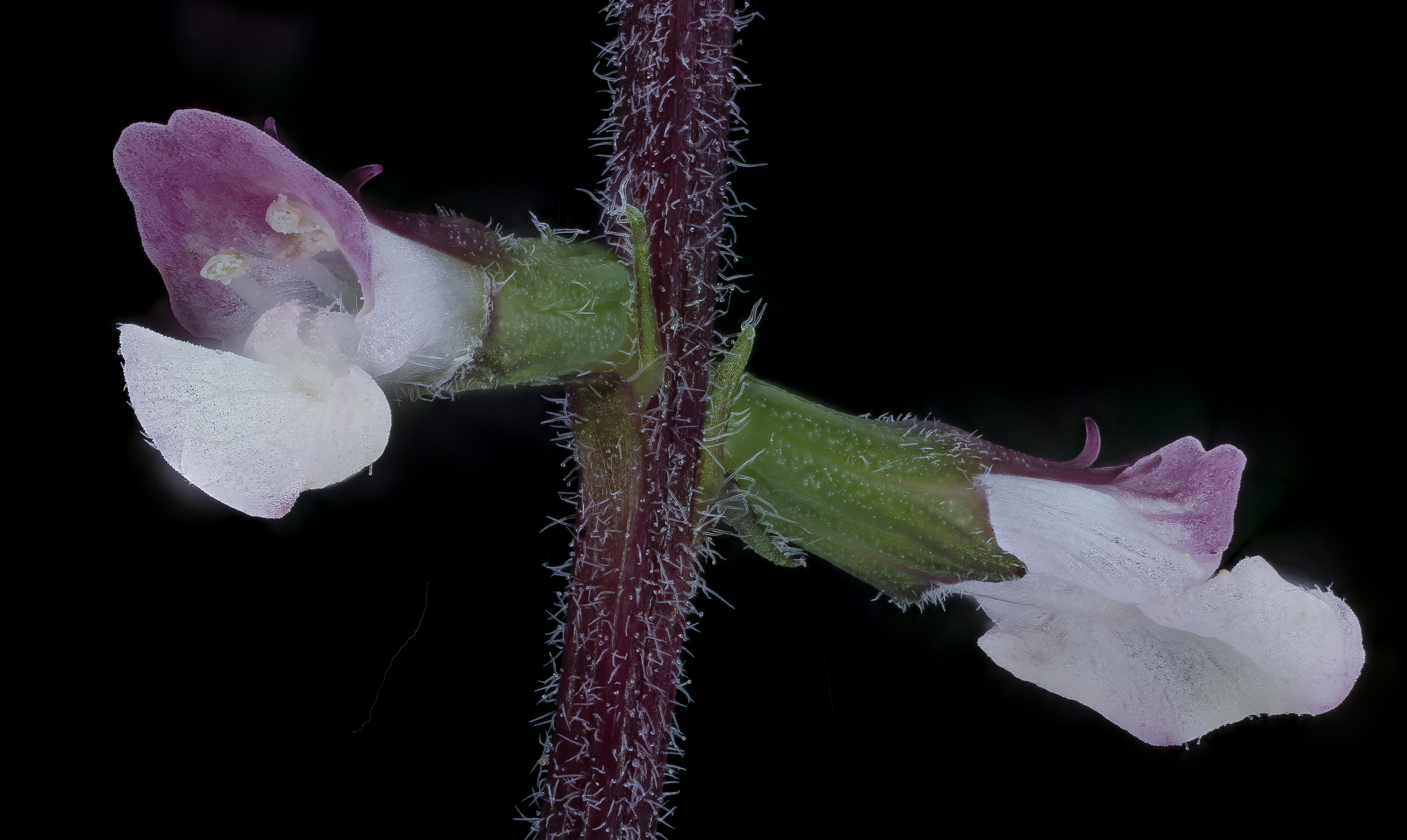
P. leptostachya

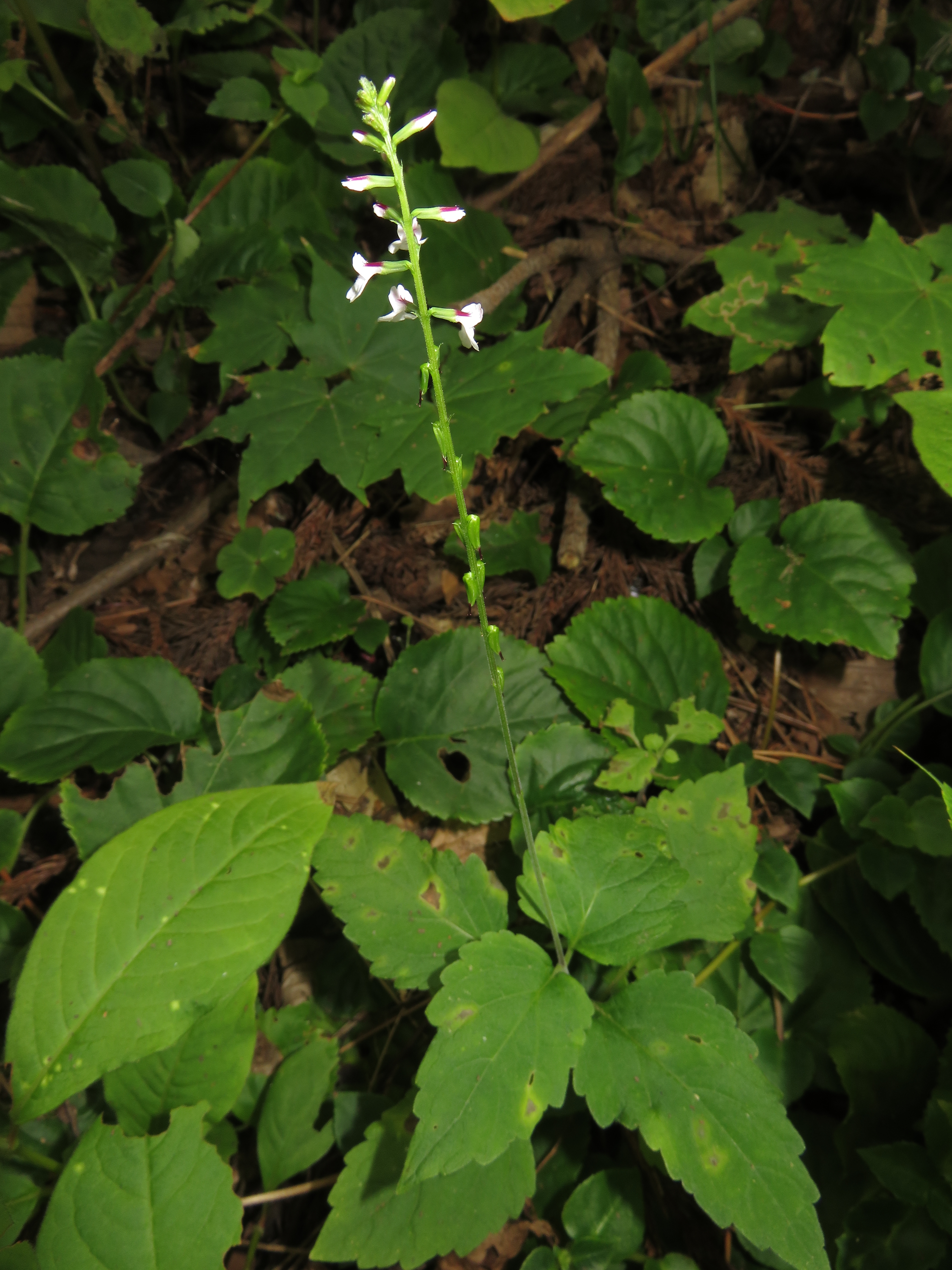
P. nana (syn. P. leptostachya var. asiatica)

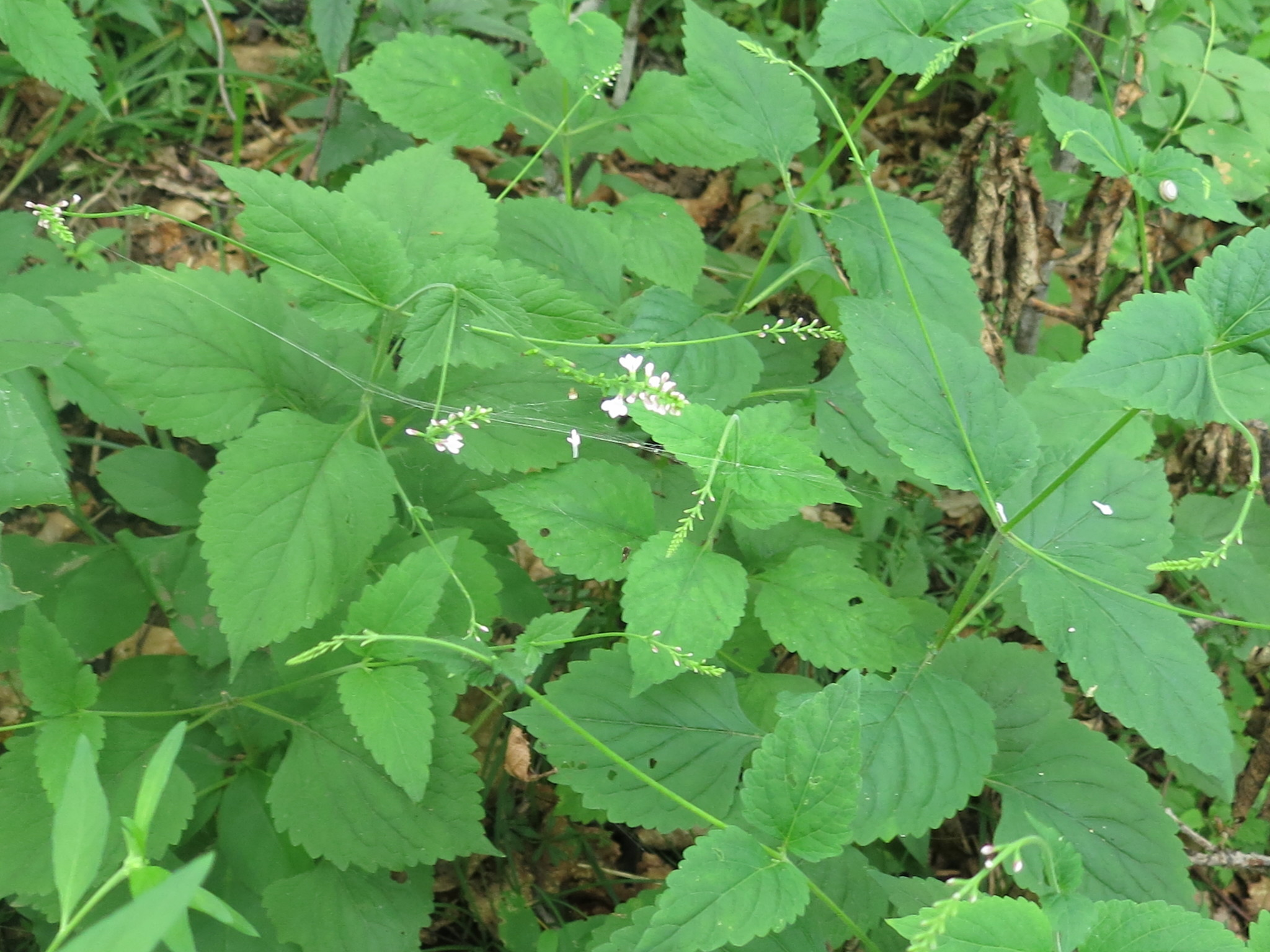
P. oblongifolia
