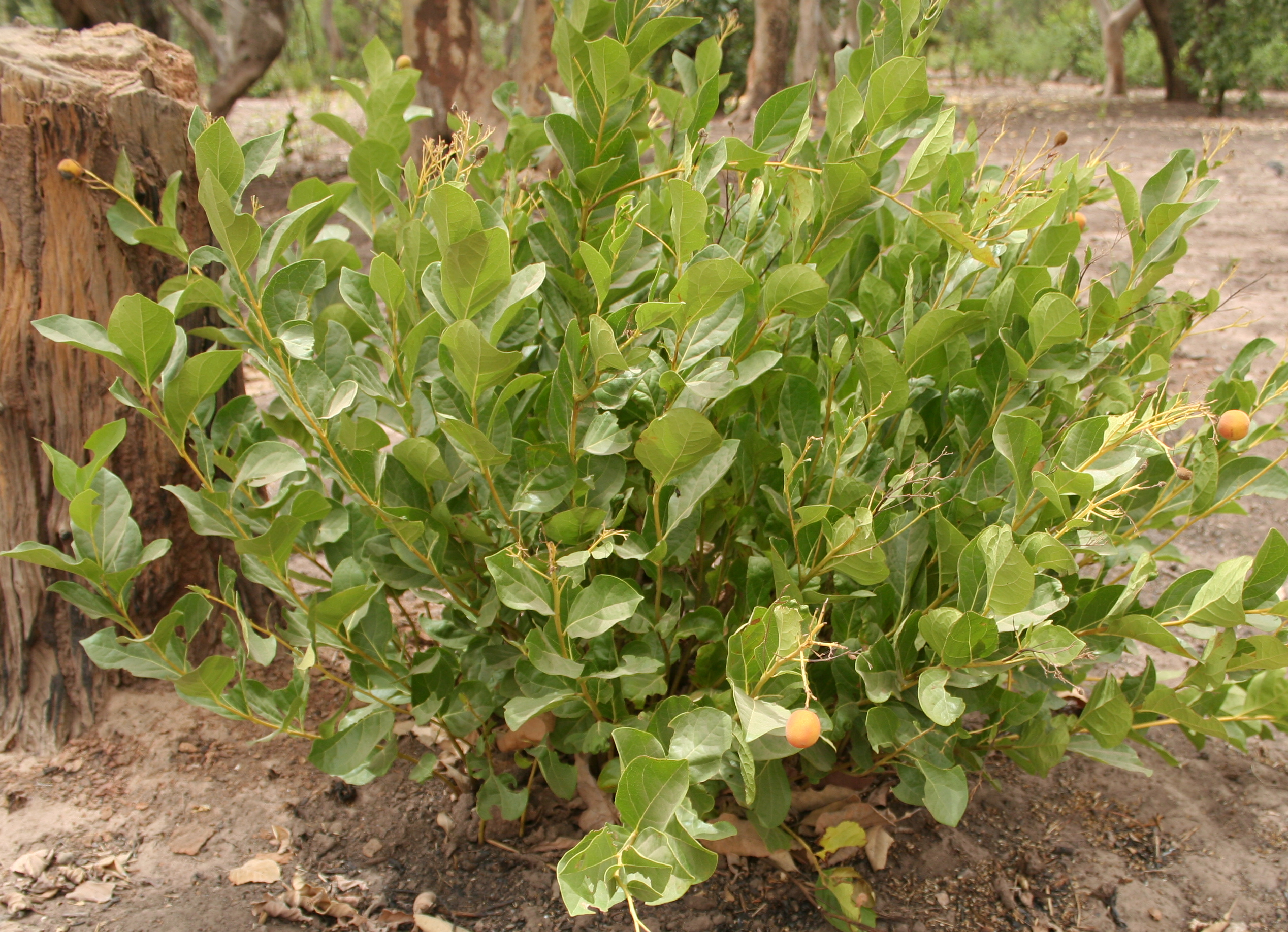
- Icacina oliviformis, or the false yam.

Scientific classification
- Kingdom: Plantae
- Clade: Tracheophytes
- Clade: Angiosperms
- Clade: Eudicots
- Clade: Asterids
- Order: Icacinales
- Family: Icacinaceae
- Genus: Icacina; A.Juss.

= Icacina =

Genus of plants

Icacina is a genus of flowering plants belonging to the family Icacinaceae.

Its native range is Cape Verde, Western Tropical Africa to South Sudan and Angola.

Species:

- Icacina claessensii De Wild.
- Icacina guessfeldtii Asch. ex Engl.
- Icacina mannii Oliv. (mutuo)
- Icacina oliviformis (Poir.) J.Raynal (false yam)
- Icacina trichantha Oliv. (urumbia, eriagbo, gbegbe)
