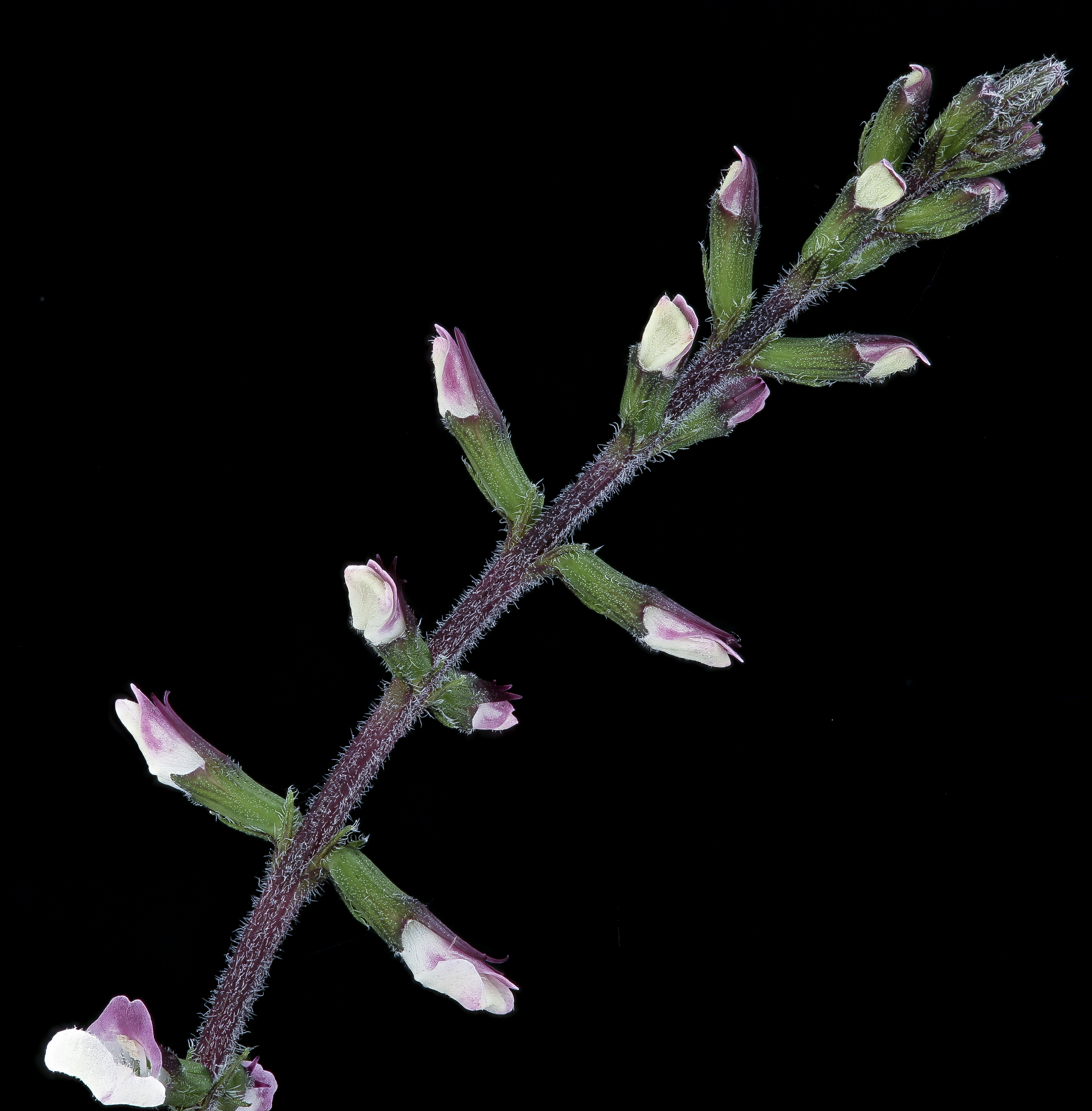

Scientific classification
- Kingdom: Plantae
- Clade: Embryophytes
- Clade: Tracheophytes
- Clade: Angiosperms
- Clade: Eudicots
- Clade: Asterids
- Order: Lamiales
- Family: Phrymaceae
- Genus: Phryma
- Species: P. leptostachya

Binomial name
- Phryma leptostachya L.

= Phryma leptostachya =

Species of flowering plant

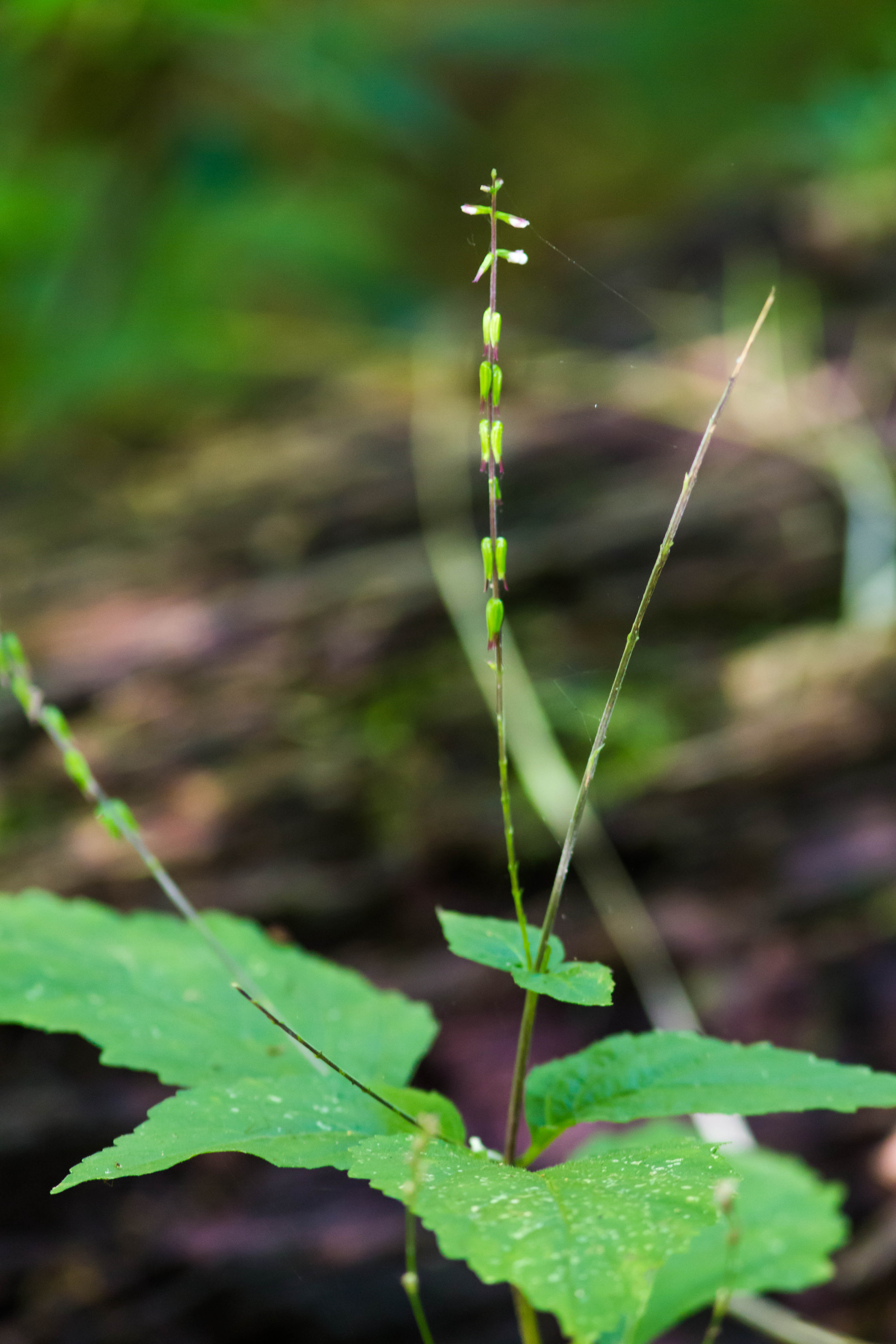

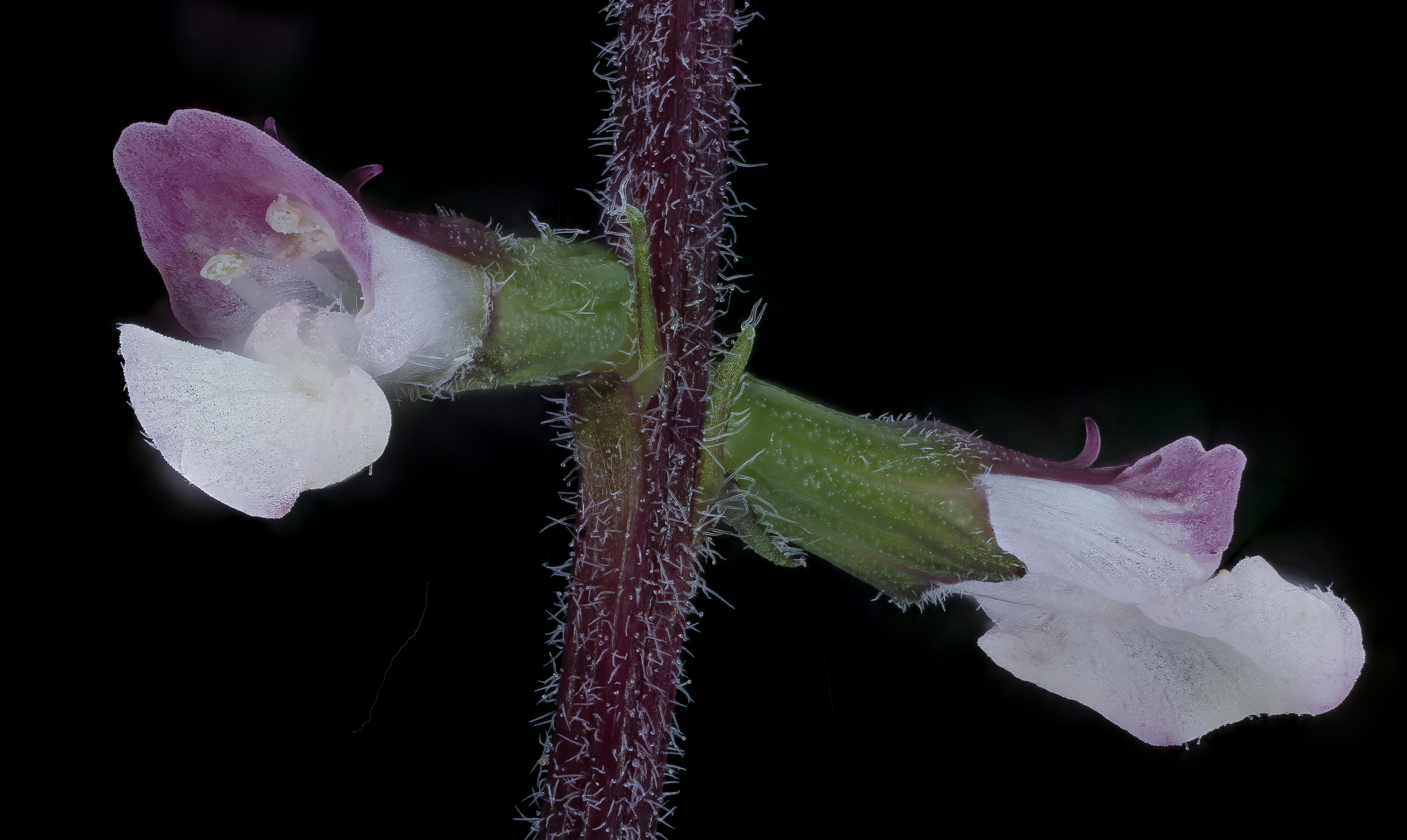

Phryma leptostachya, or lopseed, is a perennial herb of the genus Phryma. When distinguished from Phryma oblongifolia and Phryma nana, it is native to eastern North America.

The plant stands about 0.3 to 1.0 meter (1 ft 0 in to 3 ft 3 in) tall, and the inflorescences bear a number of small (4 mm) tube-shaped white to pink flowers.

== Taxonomy ==
Phryma leptostachya was first described by Carl Linnaeus in 1753. It was the only species he placed in his genus Phryma. Two further species were later described by the Japanese botanist Gen-ichi Koidzumi, Phryma oblongifolia and Phryma nana. However, these species were generally not accepted, and populations in Asia and North America were usually treated as the single species Phryma leptostachya, being distinguished only at the rank of subspecies and variety. Presently, treating all three as full species is supported by morphological and earlier molecular phylogenetic evidence, and all three are accepted by Plants of the World Online, as of April 2022, although other sources may continue to use a single species with only intraspecific divisions.
