= Tetramerista =

Scientific classification
- Kingdom: Plantae
- Clade: Tracheophytes
- Clade: Angiosperms
- Clade: Eudicots
- Clade: Asterids
- Order: Ericales
- Family: Tetrameristaceae
- Genus: Tetramerista; Miq.

Genus of flowering plants

Tetramerista is a genus of flowering plants belonging to the family Tetrameristaceae.

Its native range is Borneo and Malaya.

Species:

- Tetramerista glabra Miq.
