= Carlemannia =

Scientific classification
- Kingdom: Plantae
- Clade: Tracheophytes
- Clade: Angiosperms
- Clade: Eudicots
- Clade: Asterids
- Order: Lamiales
- Family: Carlemanniaceae
- Genus: Carlemannia; Benth.

Species
- See text

Genus of flowering plants

Carlemannia is a genus of flowering plants in the family Carlemanniaceae, found in Nepal, the eastern Himalaya, Assam, Tibet, south-central and southeast China, Indochina, and Sumatra. Basal in their lineage, which is now thought to be the Lamiales, they have a chromosome count of 2n=30.

== Species ==
Currently accepted species include:

- Carlemannia congesta Hook.f.
- Carlemannia griffithii Benth.
- Carlemannia tetragona Hook.f.
