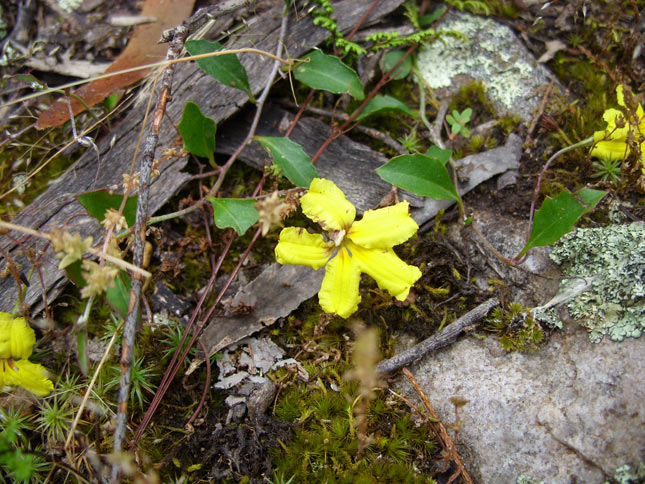
- Goodenia hederacea subsp. hederacea at Koorawatha Nature Reserve

Scientific classification
- Kingdom: Plantae
- Clade: Tracheophytes
- Clade: Angiosperms
- Clade: Eudicots
- Clade: Asterids
- Order: Asterales
- Family: Goodeniaceae
- Genus: Goodenia
- Species: G. hederacea

Binomial name
- Goodenia hederacea Sm.

= Goodenia hederacea =

Forest goodenia

Species of flowering plant

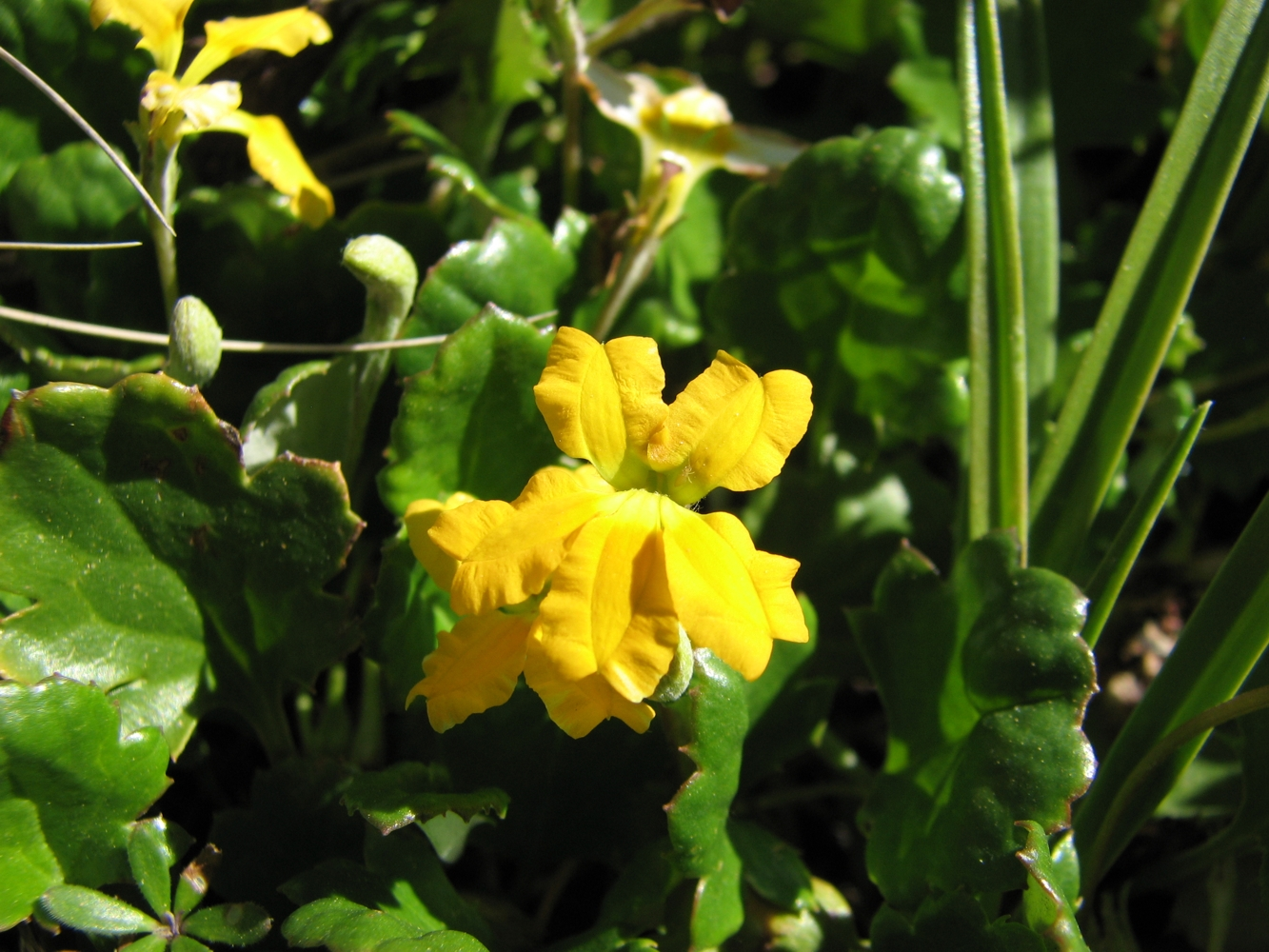
Subspecies alpestris at Mount Skene

Goodenia hederacea, commonly known as forest goodenia or ivy goodenia, is a species of flowering plant that is endemic to eastern Australia. It is a prostrate to ascending, perennial herb with linear to elliptic or round leaves, and racemes of yellow flowers.

== Description ==
Goodenia hederacea is a prostrate or ascending, perennial herb with stems up to 80 cm (31 in) long. The leaves are linear to elliptic or round, 10–120 mm (0.39–4.72 in) long and 3–25 mm (0.12–0.98 in) wide on a petiole up to 40 mm (1.6 in) long. The flowers are arranged in racemes up to 80 cm (31 in) long on a pedicel up to 50 mm (2.0 in) long with linear bracteoles 3–5 mm (0.12–0.20 in) long. The sepals are linear to lance-shaped, 3–5 mm (0.12–0.20 in) long, the corolla 8–15 mm (0.31–0.59 in) long with cottony hairs on the back. The lower lobes of the corolla are 3.5–7 mm (0.14–0.28 in) long with wings up to 2 mm (0.079 in) wide. The fruit is an oval capsule 5–9 mm (0.20–0.35 in) long.

== Taxonomy ==
Goodenia hederacea was first formally described by English botanist James Edward Smith in 1794 in Transactions of the Linnean Society of London.

In 1912, Kurt Krause described the variety alpestris in Engler's journal Das Pflanzenreich and in 1990, Roger Charles Carolin raised the variety to subspecies status in the journal Telopea. The name is accepted by the Australian Plant Census along with the autonym subsp. hederacea:

- Goodenia hederacea subsp. alpestris (K.Krause) Carolin;
- Goodenia hederacea Sm. subsp. hederacea.

Subspecies alpestris has stems that form roots at the nodes and leaves that have cottony white hairs on the lower side, a petiole mostly 15–30 mm (0.59–1.18 in) long and flowers from November to April. The stems of subspecies hederacea do not form roots at the nodes, the leaves have soft hairs when young, the petiole is 3–10 mm (0.12–0.39 in) long and flowering mainly occurs from August to March.

== Distribution and habitat ==
Forest goodenia usually grows in forest on a variety of soils, from south-east Queensland to Victoria. Subspecies alpestris grows in subalpine grassland and woodland south from Kiandra in New South Wales to the higher parts of the eastern ranges of Victoria.

== Conservation status ==
Goodenia hederacea subsp. hederacea is classified as of "least concern" in Queensland by the Queensland Department of Environment and Science, under the Nature Conservation Act 1992.

== Use in horticulture ==
In cultivation, the species prefers a situation in part shade and with some moisture. It copes with a range of soil types and tolerates frost and snow.
