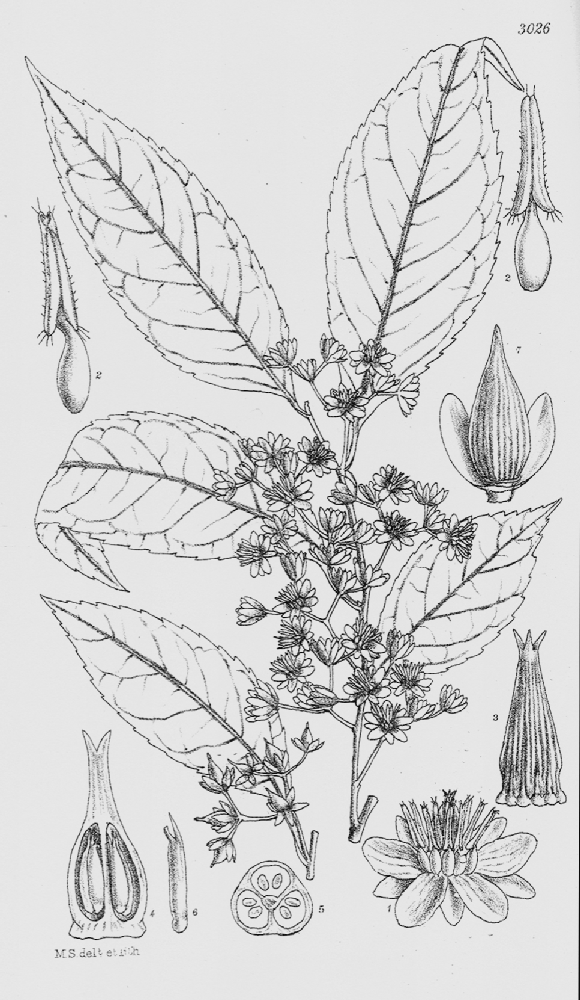
- Sladenia celastrifolia

Scientific classification
- Kingdom: Plantae
- Clade: Tracheophytes
- Clade: Angiosperms
- Clade: Eudicots
- Clade: Asterids
- Order: Ericales
- Family: Sladeniaceae; Airy Shaw

Genera
- Ficalhoa; Sladenia

= Sladeniaceae =

Family of flowering plants

Sladeniaceae is a family of flowering plants containing tree species found in subtropical to tropical environments in East Africa (Ficalhoa), Burma, Yunnan, and Thailand (Sladenia). The family consists of trees with alternate, simple leaves without stipules, and flowers arranged in cymose inflorescences.

The circumscription of the family is variable, with some systems describing the family as consisting solely of the genus Sladenia, which has been variously considered a member of the Theaceae, the Actinidiaceae, the Dilleniaceae, or the Ternstroemiaceae. Other systems include the genus Ficalhoa and possibly the genus Pentaphylax in a family with Sladenia. Morphological studies of the Sladenia embryo suggest it has unique characteristics that merit placing the genus in its own family. However, the plant family is poorly studied and initial phylogenetic studies have raised contradictory indications about its taxonomic placement.
