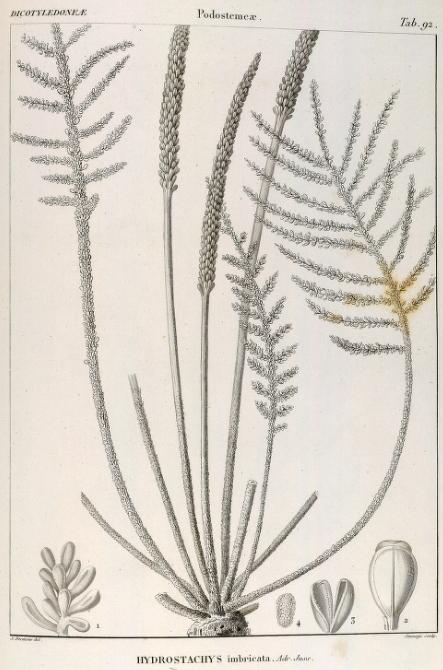

Scientific classification
- Kingdom: Plantae
- Clade: Tracheophytes
- Clade: Angiosperms
- Clade: Eudicots
- Clade: Asterids
- Order: Cornales
- Family: Hydrostachyaceae
- Genus: Hydrostachys
- Species: H. imbricata

Binomial name
- Hydrostachys imbricata A.Juss.

= Hydrostachys imbricata =

Species of flowering plant

Hydrostachys imbricata is a species of aquatic flowering plant in the genus Hydrostachys.
