= Gillian Perry (botanist) =

Australian botanist and nomenclaturist (1943–2011)

- Born: Gillian Jenkins; 19 October 1943; Perth, Western Australia
- Died: 22 August 2011 (aged 67); Perth, Western Australia
- Education: University of Western Australia; Macquarie University
- Known for: Botanical nomenclature
- Scientific career
- Workplaces: Western Australian Herbarium

Gillian Perry (born Gillian Jenkins, 19 October 1943 – 22 August 2011) was an Australian botanist. She is recognised internationally for her work in botanical nomenclature.

== Career ==
Gillian Perry was born in Perth, Western Australia on 19 October 1943, only daughter of entomologists Eileen Alice (born Bowley) and Clee Francis Howard Jenkins (1908–1997). She graduated from the University of Western Australia in 1967 with a BSc.

Perry began work as a plant physiologist at the WA Forests Department and the Institute of Agriculture. She later transferred to Macquarie University where her focus was on plant hormones. While at Macquarie, she completed an MSc, awarded in 1974.

Back in Perth in 1971, Perry was employed at the Western Australian Herbarium where she researched the genus Logania. Her focus moved to weed flora and she provided expert advice to the WA Agricultural Protection Board.

Perry resigned from the Herbarium in April 1994 following its transfer to the Department of Conservation and Land Management.

Her interest in nomenclature began in 1981 when she first attended an International Botanical Congress. Over the next 30 years, she submitted 69 proposals "to amend and clarify the Code".

She also served on the Committee for Vascular Plants from 1987 to her death.

Perry attended the XVIII International Botanical Congress in Melbourne in 2011. While returning home, she died at Ceduna, Australia on 22 August 2011. She was survived by her husband, Michael Perry.

The species, Logania perryana, is named in her honour.
