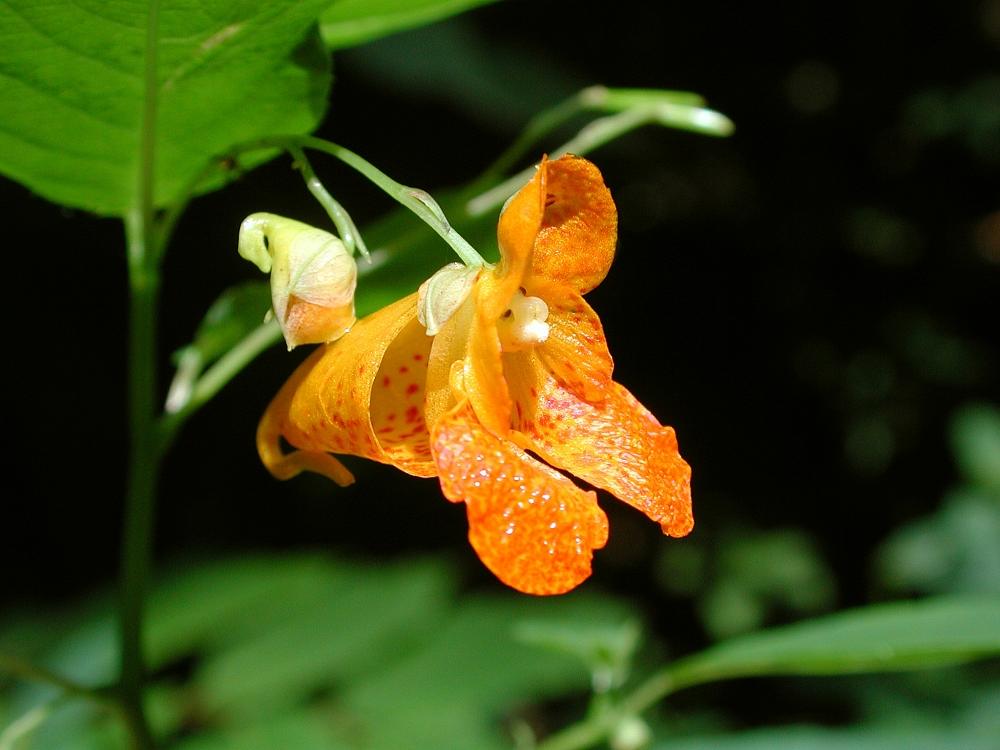
- Impatiens capensis (Ericales)
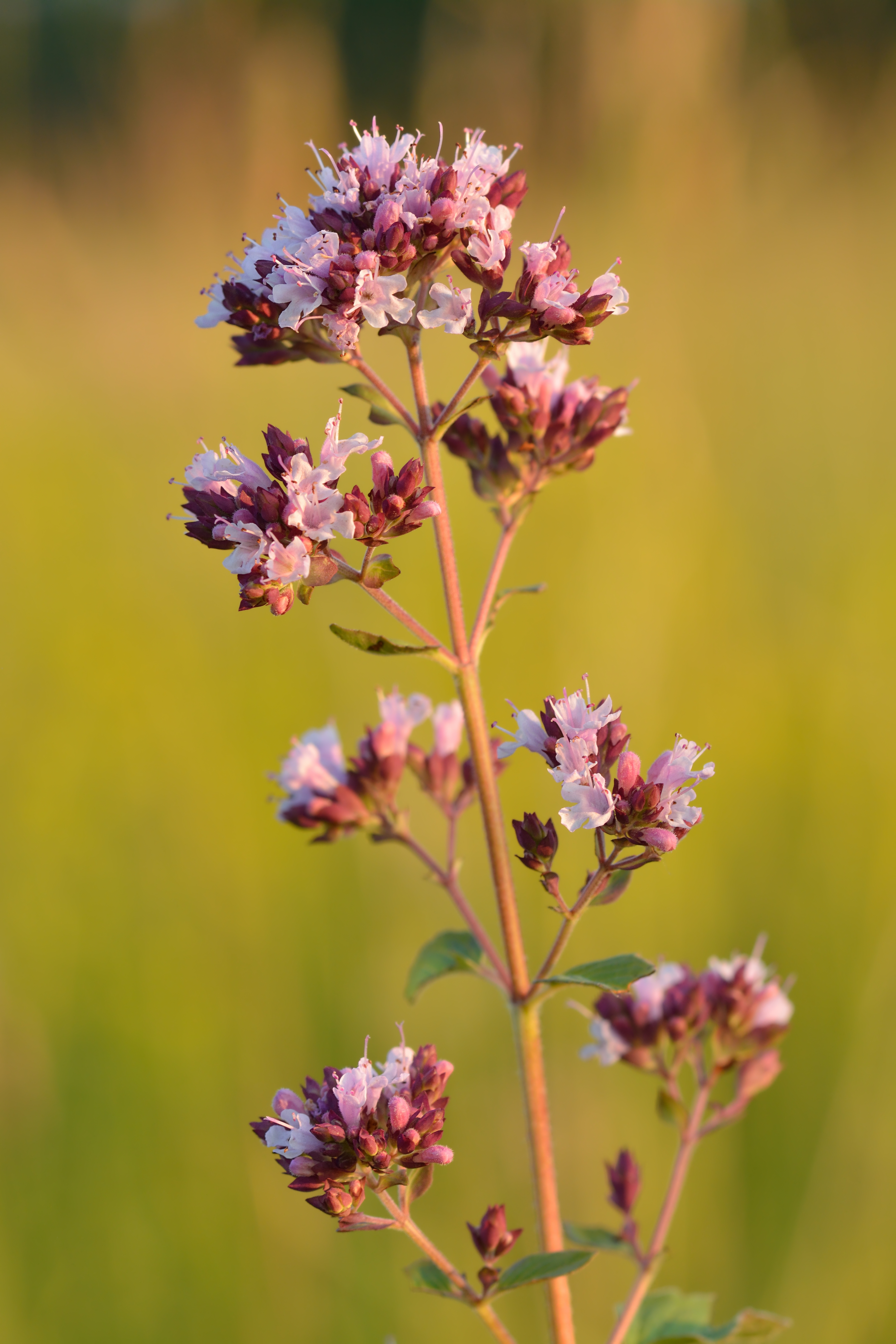
- Oregano from Lamiales

Scientific classification
- Kingdom: Plantae
- Clade: Embryophytes
- Clade: Tracheophytes
- Clade: Spermatophytes
- Clade: Angiosperms
- Clade: Eudicots
- Clade: Core eudicots
- Clade: Superasterids
- Clade: Asterids

Clades
- Cornales; Ericales; Euasterids Lamiids Icacinales Metteniusales Garryales Gentianales Solanales Boraginales Vahliales Lamiales Campanulids Aquifoliales Escalloniales Asterales Bruniales Apiales Paracryphiales Dipsacales

= Asterids =

Asterids Temporal range: Late Cretaceous–recent

Clade of eudicot angiosperms

Asterids are a large clade (monophyletic group) of flowering plants, composed of 17 orders and more than 80,000 species, about a third of the total flowering plant species. The asterids are divided into the unranked clades lamiids (8 orders) and campanulids (7 orders), and the single orders Cornales and Ericales. Well-known asterids include dogwoods and hydrangeas (order Cornales), tea, blueberries, cranberries, kiwifruit, Brazil nuts, argan, sapote, and azaleas (order Ericales), sunflowers, lettuce, common daisy, yacon, carrots, celery, parsley, parsnips, ginseng, ivies, holly, honeysuckle, elder, and valerian (clade campanulids), borage, forget-me-nots, comfrey, coffee, frangipani, gentian, pong-pong, oleander, periwinkle, basil, mint, rosemary, sage, oregano, thyme, lavender, wild dagga, olives, ash, teak, foxgloves, lilac, jasmine, snapdragons, African violets, butterfly bushes, sesame, psyllium, potatoes, eggplants, tomatoes, chilli peppers, tobacco, petunias, morning glory, and sweet potato (clade lamiids).

Most of the taxa belonging to this clade had been referred to as Asteridae in the Cronquist system (1981) and as Sympetalae in earlier systems. The name asterids (not necessarily capitalised) resembles the earlier botanical name but is intended to be the name of a clade rather than a formal ranked name, in the sense of the ICBN.

== History ==
Genetic analysis carried out after APG II maintains that the sister to all other asterids are the Cornales. A second order that split from the base of the asterids are the Ericales. The remaining orders cluster into two clades, the lamiids and the campanulids. The structure of both of these clades has changed in APG III.

In the APG III system, the following clades were renamed:

euasterids I → lamiids
euasterids II → campanulids

== Phylogeny ==
The phylogenetic tree presented hereinafter has been proposed by the APG IV project.

- Asterids
  - Cornales
  - - Ericales
    - Euasterids
      - Campanulids
        - Aquifoliales
        - - Asterales
          - Escalloniales
          - - Bruniales
            - - Apiales
              - - Dipsacales
                - Paracryphiales
      - Lamiids
        - Icacinales
        - - Metteniusales
          - - Garryales
            - - Boraginales
              - Gentianales
              - Vahliales
              - Lamiales
              - Solanales

=== Subdivision ===
==== Lamiids ====
The lamiid subclade consists of about 40,000 species and account for about 15% of angiosperm diversity, characterized in general by superior ovaries and corollas with any fusion of the petals (sympetaly) occurring late in the process of development. The major part of lamiid diversity occurs in the group of five orders from Boraginales to Solanales, referred to informally as "core lamiids" (sometimes called Laminae). The remainder of the lamiids are referred to as "basal lamiids", in which Garryales is the sister group to the core lamiids. It has been suggested that the core lamiids radiated from an ancestral line of tropical trees in which the flowers were inconspicuous and the fruit large, drupaceous and often single-seeded.

== See also ==
- List of lamiid families
- List of basal asterid families

== Bibliography ==
- Stull, Gregory W.; Duno de Stefano, Rodrigo; Soltis, Douglas E.; Soltis, Pamela S. (November 2015). "Resolving basal lamiid phylogeny and the circumscription of Icacinaceae with a plastome-scale data set". American Journal of Botany. 102 (11): 1794–1813. doi:10.3732/ajb.1500298. PMID 26507112.
