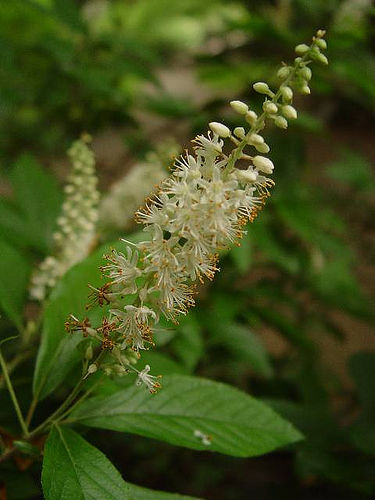

Conservation status
- Apparently Secure (NatureServe)

Scientific classification
- Kingdom: Plantae
- Clade: Tracheophytes
- Clade: Angiosperms
- Clade: Eudicots
- Clade: Asterids
- Order: Ericales
- Family: Clethraceae
- Genus: Clethra
- Species: C. acuminata

Binomial name
- Clethra acuminata Michx.

Synonyms
- Clethra alnifolia var. michauxii (Courtois) G. Nicholson; Clethra glauca Pers.; Clethra glauca Steud.; Clethra michauxii Courtois; Clethra montana Fraser ex Loisel.

= Clethra acuminata =

Species of flowering plant

Clethra acuminata, the mountain pepper bush, is a shrub native to the Appalachian Mountains of the southeastern United States. It has been reported from the states of Pennsylvania, West Virginia, Virginia, North Carolina, South Carolina, Georgia, Alabama and Tennessee, primarily from deciduous forests at elevations of 500–1,400 m (1,600–4,600 ft).

Clethra acuminata is a native plant to the lower 48 states of the United States. It is an understory shrub found in the Appalachian region of the eastern United States. Other common names of Clethra acuminata include cinnamon clethra, mountain sweetpepperbush, and mountain sweet pepperbush. Clethra acuminata is a distinct species due to its floral and vegetative morphology within the genus. While Clethra acuminata is sometimes misidentified as Clethra alnifolia, they are two distinct species, Clethra acuminata has longer leaves.

== Description ==
Clethra acuminata can reach as high as 6 m (20 ft) tall. It has alternately arranged, acuminate leaves with fine teeth along the margins, 8–20 cm (3.1–7.9 in) long, glabrous above and slightly hairy or glabrous underneath. Clethra acuminata is a dicot perennial and a temperate deciduous shrub. The leaves are simple and crowded towards the ends of branches, and the bisexual flowers are typically white and bell-shaped and less than one inch in length. The flowers of Clethra acuminata grow in cone shaped racemes that vary from three to eight inches in length. The flowers are rich in nectar, which helps to support native pollinators. The flowers of C. acuminata bloom from the months of June to August. C. acuminata flowers are lost during winter and are replaced by brown capsule fruit. The seeds are typically eaten by birds and are displayed from September to October. The leaves of C. acuminata turn yellow and orange during the fall. As C. acuminata ages, the bark peels to show a cinnamon colored interior; this is where one of its common names, cinnamon clethra, originates. Clethra acuminata can grow from eight to twenty feet in height and four to six feet in width. Bark on older plants splits and peels in thin sheets, revealing cinnamon colored bark underneath. Inflorescences are 3–8 inches (7.6–20.3 cm) racemes with bell-shaped white flowers.

Clethra acumniata is commonly mistaken for Clethra alnifolia due to their similar appearances, the differences are many, but the most recognizable difference lies in their leaf shape Clethra acuminata has 8–20 cm long leaves that do not have deep serrations while Clethra alnifolia has 7–10 cm long leaves with deep serrations along the upper half of the leaf's edges. Clethra accuminata is also different from Clethra alnifolia at its pubescent stages and in the number of vascular suppliers to the sepals.

== Distribution ==
Clethra acuminata is distributed from northwest Georgia to southwest Pennsylvania. It tends to be found in hardwood forests in the higher elevations of the Appalachian Mountains as an understory component. Clethra acuminata lives in the 6a, 6b, 7a, and 7b USDA identified tolerance zones. Clethra acuminata's sister species Clethra alnifolia is found along the coast from as north as New York and as south as Texas, while going as far west as Tennessee.

== Taxonomy ==
Clethra acuminata was discovered and named by French botanist Andre Michaux in his work The Flora Boreali published in 1829-1840.

== Uses ==
The primary modern use of Clethra acuminata outside of its native habitat is in landscape planting as an ornamental. The bark of C. acuminata was used by the native Cherokee tribe as an antiemetic taken to ease vomiting, as well as an emetic to induce vomiting.

== Cultivation ==
Clethra acuminata should be grown in moist soil, and has been recognized as an important pollinator plant, in native plant gardens, supporting and attracting hummingbirds, butterflies, and honeybees. Clethra acuminata is most successfully cultivated when grown in partial sun. If grown successfully, C. acuminata can grow to more than twenty feet tall. The best soil type for C. acuminata is moist, humus-rich, an acidic pH less than six is preferable, as well as a rockier soil type. There are no common pest issues; however, root rot is common. There is no seed pretreatment required for seed germination. Clethra acuminata responds well to pruning and maintains its shape well. Clethra acuminata is a good choice for cultivation due to its heartiness against common pests including deer, disease, and physiological problems.

== Propagation ==
Clethra acuminata can be propagated from cuttings or from seeds. The best time for softwood cuttings of C. acuminata is early summer.

== Conservation status ==
Clethra acuminata is considered apparently secure in North Carolina, Virginia, West Virginia, and Kentucky. In Pennsylvania and Louisiana C. acuminata is considered critically imperiled. In South Carolina, Georgia, and Tennessee Clethra acuminata does not currently have a status rank.

== Gallery ==
Pictures of Clethra acuminata (mountain pepper bush)
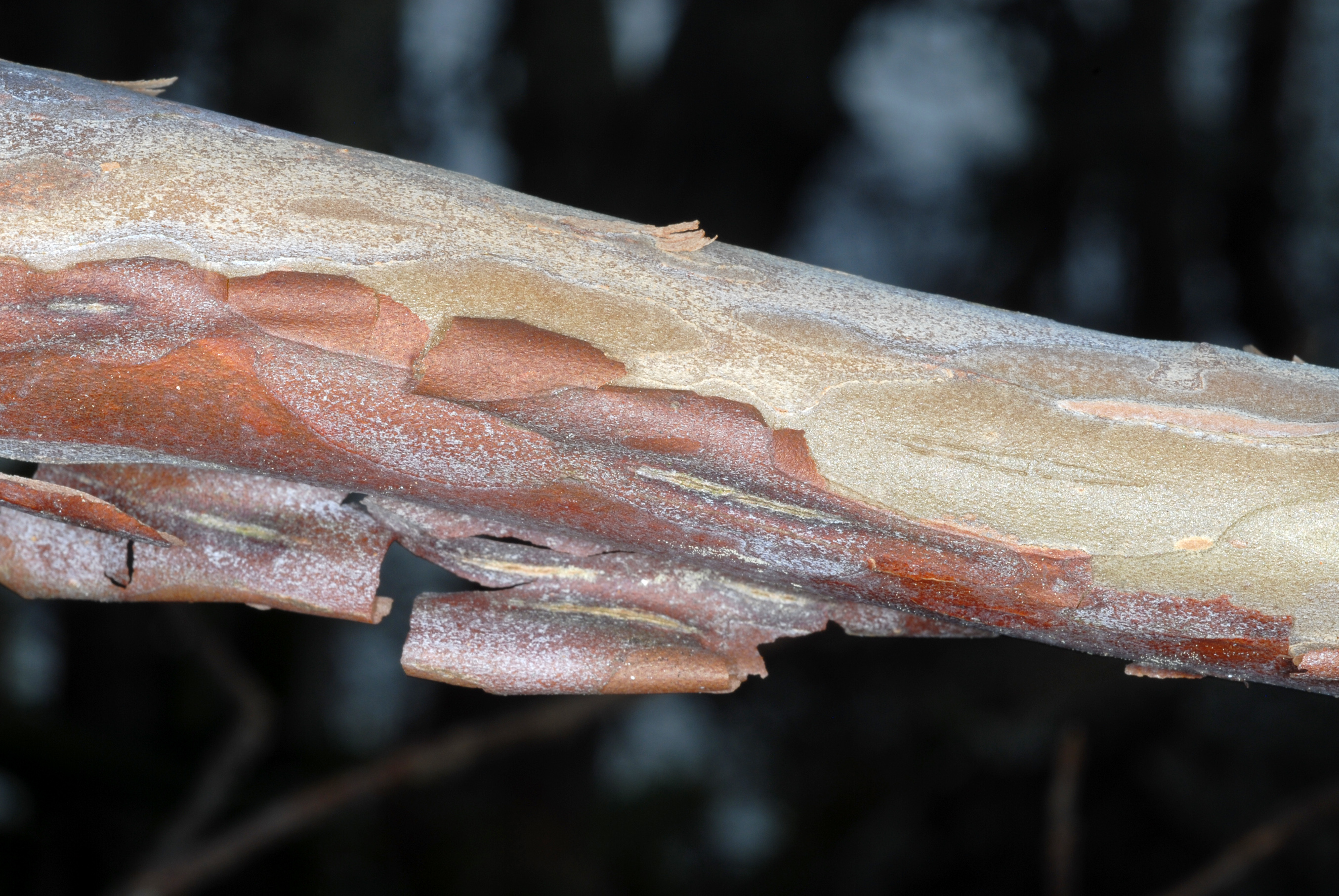
Peeling cinnamon-colored bark of Clethra acuminata

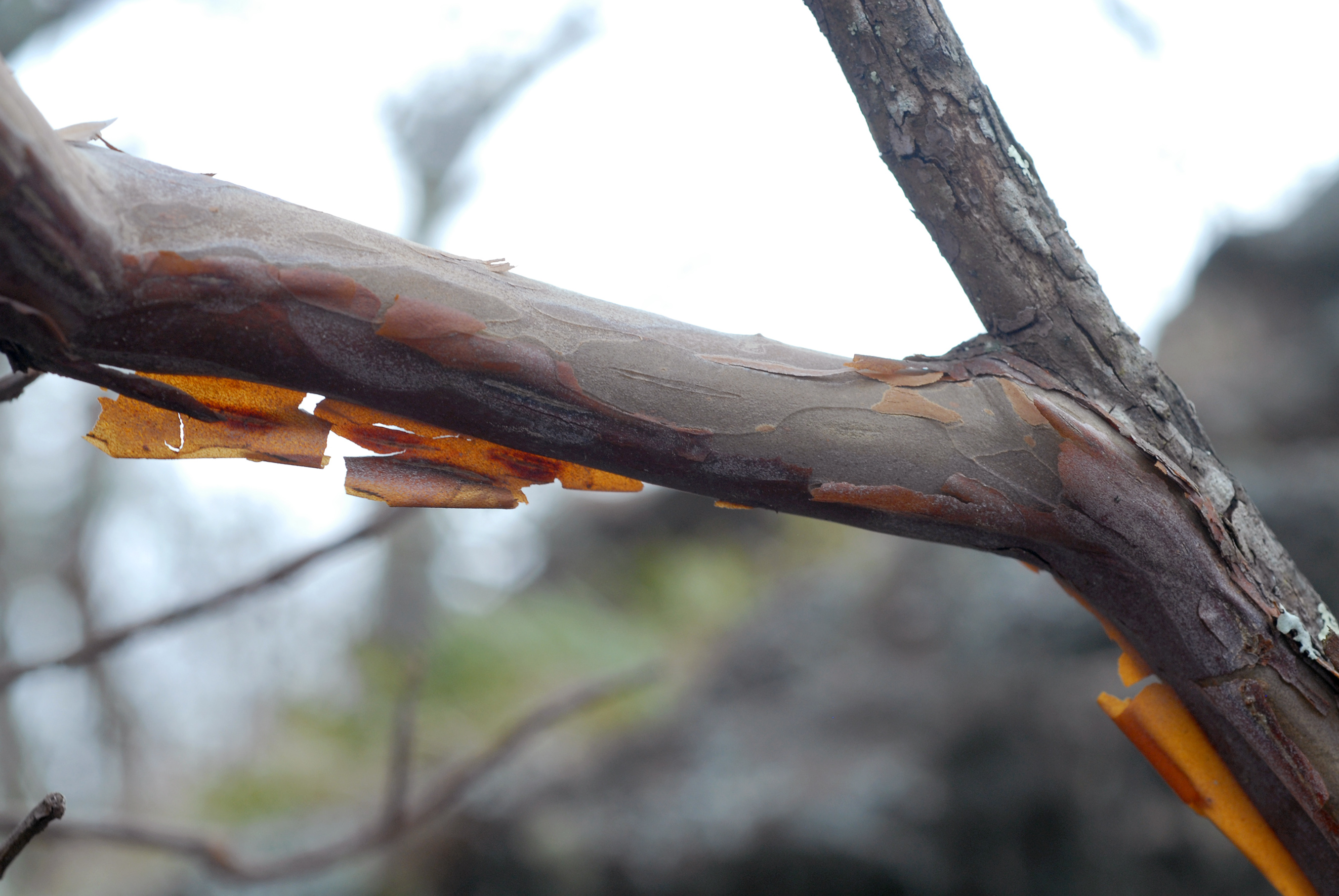
Another example of the peeling cinnamon-colored bark of Clethra acuminata

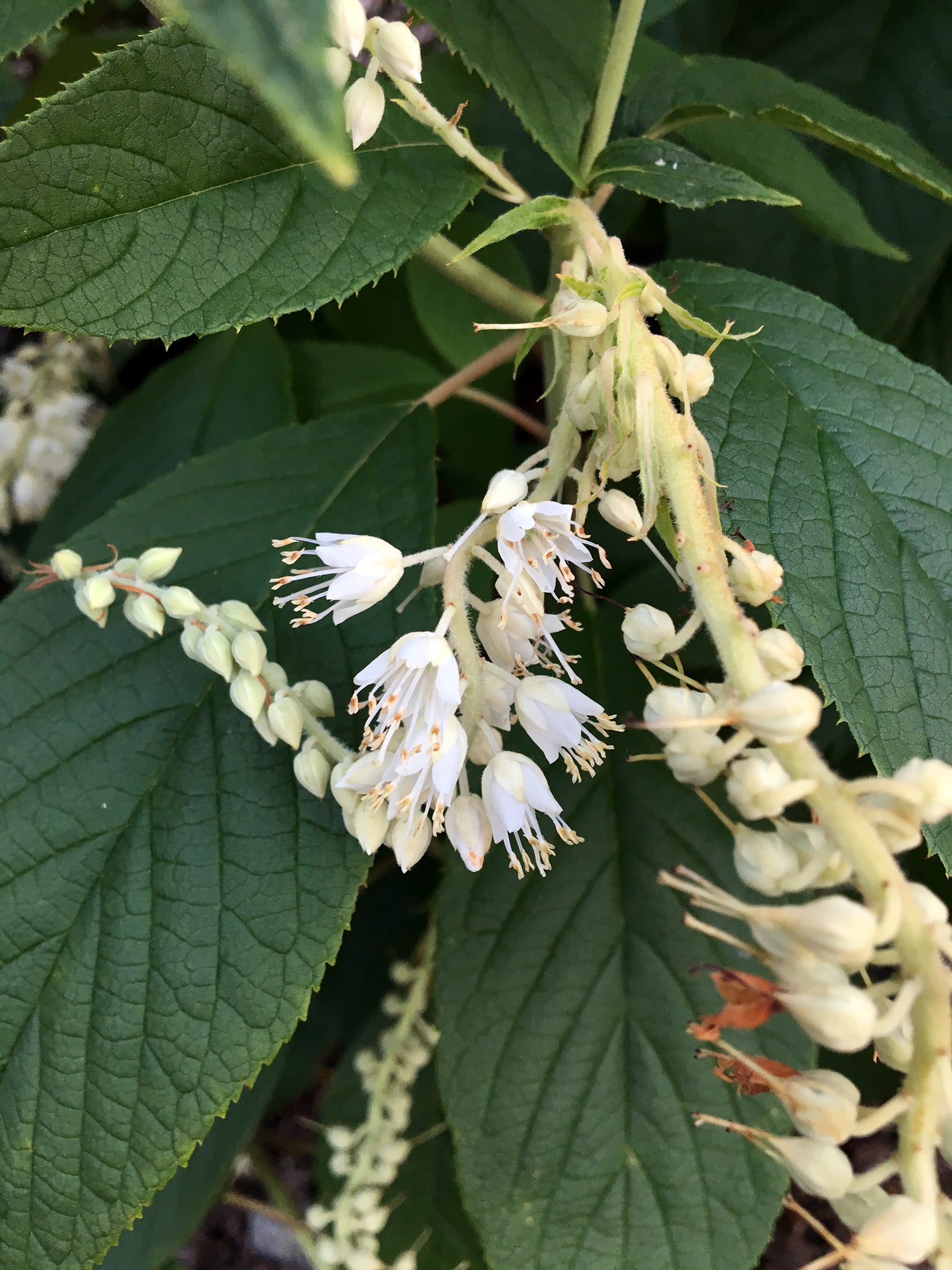
Inflorescence of Clethra acuminata
