= Clethra canescens var. clementis =

Scientific classification
- Kingdom: Plantae
- Clade: Tracheophytes
- Clade: Angiosperms
- Clade: Eudicots
- Clade: Asterids
- Order: Ericales
- Family: Clethraceae
- Genus: Clethra
- Species: C. canescens
- Variety: C. c. var. clementis

Trinomial name
- Clethra canescens var. clementis (Merr.) Sleumer

Synonyms
- Clethra clementis Merr.

Variety of tree

Clethra canescens var. clementis is a tree in the family Clethraceae.

== Description ==
Clethra canescens var. clementis grows up to 10 metres (30 ft) tall. The smooth bark is pale brown. The scented flowers are white. The roundish fruits measure up to 0.3 cm (0.1 in) in diameter.

== Distribution and habitat ==
Clethra canescens var. clementis is endemic to Borneo. Its habitat is montane forests, occasionally lowland forests.
