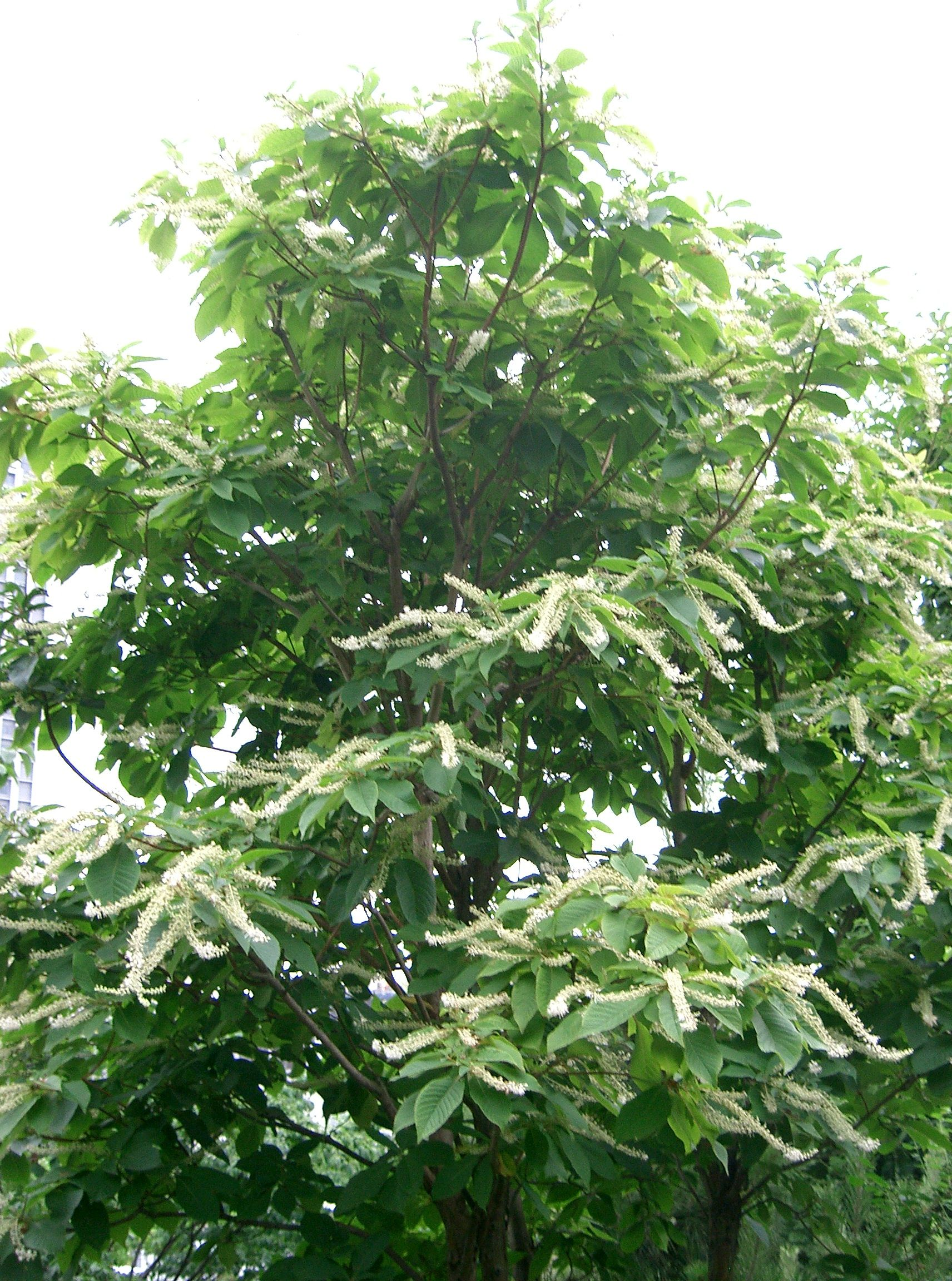

Conservation status
- Least Concern (IUCN 3.1)

Scientific classification
- Kingdom: Plantae
- Clade: Tracheophytes
- Clade: Angiosperms
- Clade: Eudicots
- Clade: Asterids
- Order: Ericales
- Family: Clethraceae
- Genus: Clethra
- Species: C. barbinervis

Binomial name
- Clethra barbinervis Siebold & Zucc.

Synonyms
- Clethra japonica Thunb. ex Steud. nom. inval.; Clethra kawadana Yanagita; Clethra stolonifera Nakai; Clethra wuyishanica R.C.Ching ex L.C.Hu

= Clethra barbinervis =

Species of flowering plant

Clethra barbinervis, the Japanese clethra, is a species of flowering plant in the family Clethraceae. It is native to eastern Asia, where it is found in southern China, Korea, and Japan. Its natural habitat is in open mountain forests. It is a common species in Japan, and is often found in disturbed secondary forests.

It is an upright shrub growing to 3 m (9.8 ft). Its leaves are deciduous, dark green, and are 5 cm (2 in) long. Racemes of small, fragrant, white flowers 15 cm (6 in) long are produced in late summer and autumn. Mature specimens have peeling bark. The bark is plain, blackish brown with twigs turning back.

This plant has gained the Royal Horticultural Society's Award of Garden Merit. Though hardy in cultivation, it requires a sheltered location in temperate regions.

== Gallery ==
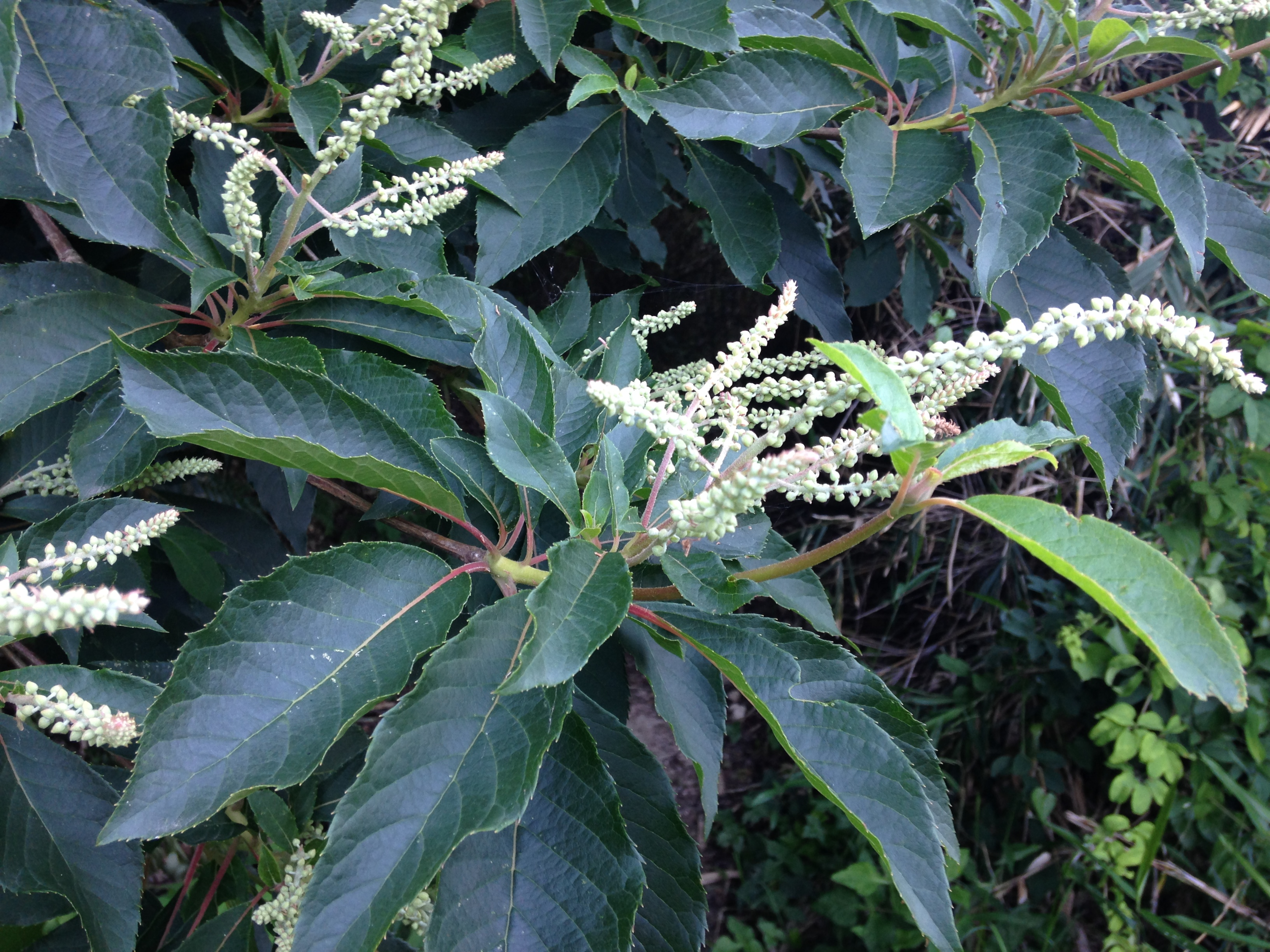
Flowers in bud with foliage

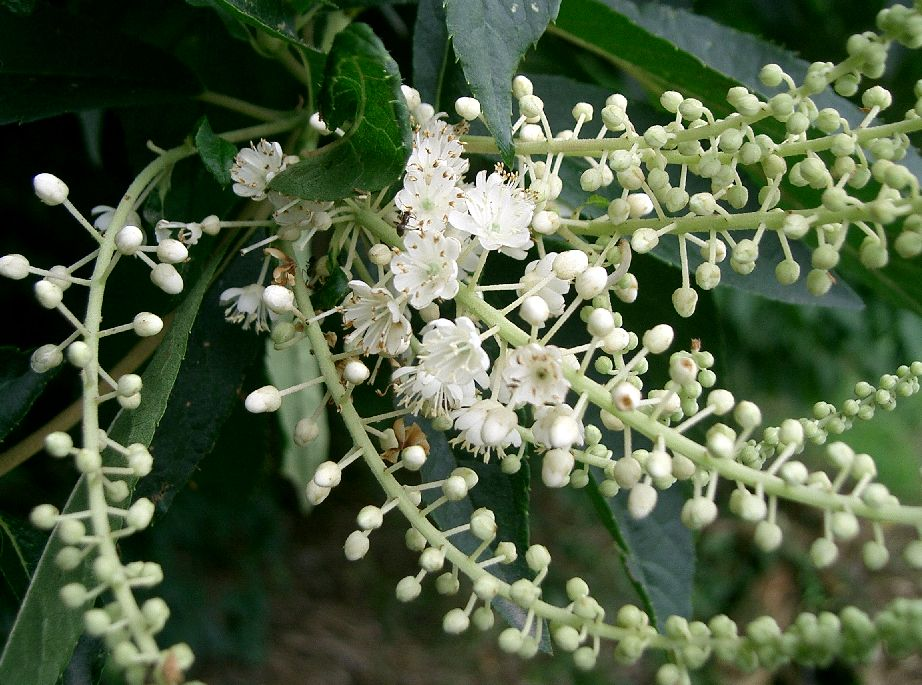
Bursting buds

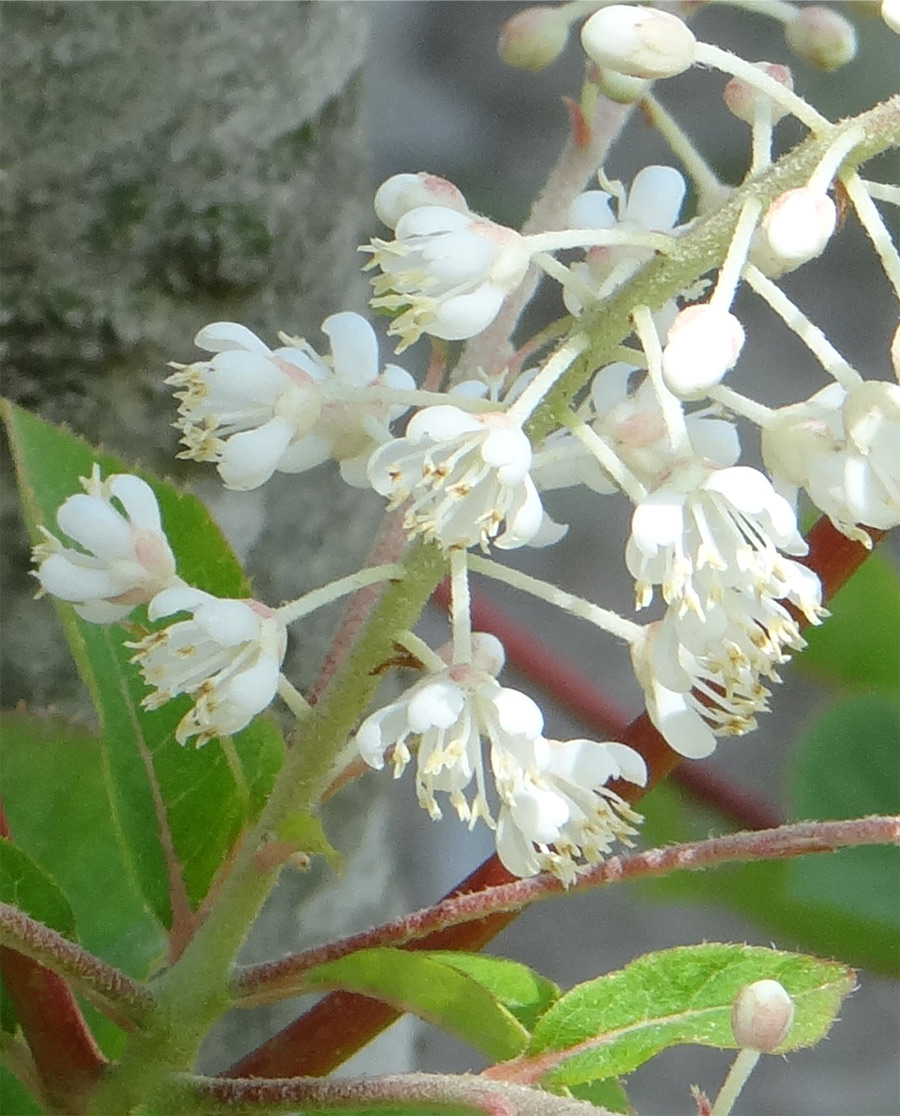
Closeup of flowers
