= Clethra longispicata =

Scientific classification
- Kingdom: Plantae
- Clade: Tracheophytes
- Clade: Angiosperms
- Clade: Eudicots
- Clade: Asterids
- Order: Ericales
- Family: Clethraceae
- Genus: Clethra
- Species: C. longispicata

Binomial name
- Clethra longispicata J.J.Sm.

Synonyms
- Clethra elongata J.J.Sm. nom. illeg. non Rusby

Species of tree

Clethra longispicata is a tree in the family Clethraceae. The specific epithet longispicata is from the Latin meaning 'long spike', referring to the inflorescence.

== Description ==
Clethra longispicata grows up to 10 metres (30 ft) tall. The fissured bark is brown. The scented flowers are white. The roundish fruits measure up to 0.25 cm (0.1 in) in diameter.

== Distribution and habitat ==
Clethra longispicata grows naturally in Borneo, the Philippines and Sulawesi. Its habitat is hill and submontane forests from 500 metres (1,600 ft) to 1,500 metres (5,000 ft) altitude.
