= Clethra pachyphylla =

Scientific classification
- Kingdom: Plantae
- Clade: Tracheophytes
- Clade: Angiosperms
- Clade: Eudicots
- Clade: Asterids
- Order: Ericales
- Family: Clethraceae
- Genus: Clethra
- Species: C. pachyphylla

Binomial name
- Clethra pachyphylla Merr.

Species of tree

Clethra pachyphylla is a tree in the family Clethraceae. The specific epithet pachyphylla is from the Greek meaning 'thick leaves'.

== Description ==
Clethra pachyphylla grows up to 10 metres (30 ft) tall. The fissured bark is pale grey. The scented flowers are white. The roundish fruits measure up to 0.3 cm (0.1 in) in diameter.

== Distribution and habitat ==
Clethra pachyphylla is endemic to Malaysian Borneo. Its habitat is hill and montane forests from 800 metres (2,600 ft) to 2,500 metres (8,000 ft) altitude.
