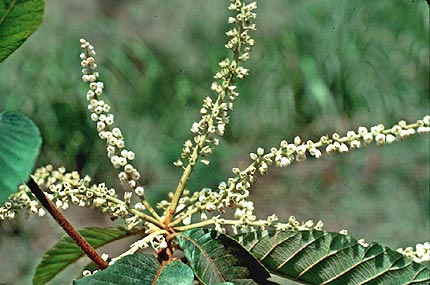
- Racemose inflorescence

Scientific classification
- Kingdom: Plantae
- Clade: Tracheophytes
- Clade: Angiosperms
- Clade: Eudicots
- Clade: Asterids
- Order: Ericales
- Family: Clethraceae
- Genus: Clethra
- Species: C. scabra

Binomial name
- Clethra scabra Pers.

Synonyms
- Clethra alnifolia var. scabra (Pers.) G.Nicholson; Clethra brasiliensis Cham. & Schltdl.; Clethra gardneri Turcz.; Clethra laevigata Meisn.; Clethra maromensis Villa; Clethra micrantha J.Remy

= Clethra scabra =

Species of plant

Clethra scabra is a shrub or tree growing in habitats from 950 to 2,500 m (3,120 to 8,200 ft) in altitude, native to the eastern Andes and adjacent montane woodlands and Chaco of Brazil, Bolivia, Paraguay, and northwest Argentina. It is able to reach 25 m (82 ft) in height, and is known to flower during March. It bears simple ovate to elongate and slightly obovate leaves 8 to 10 cm (3.1 to 3.9 in) in length and 4 to 6 cm (1.6 to 2.4 in) in width. These leaves tend to bear stellate hairs, and have prominent veins upon their abaxial face. The white flowers are small, borne upon a terminal spray of racemes.
