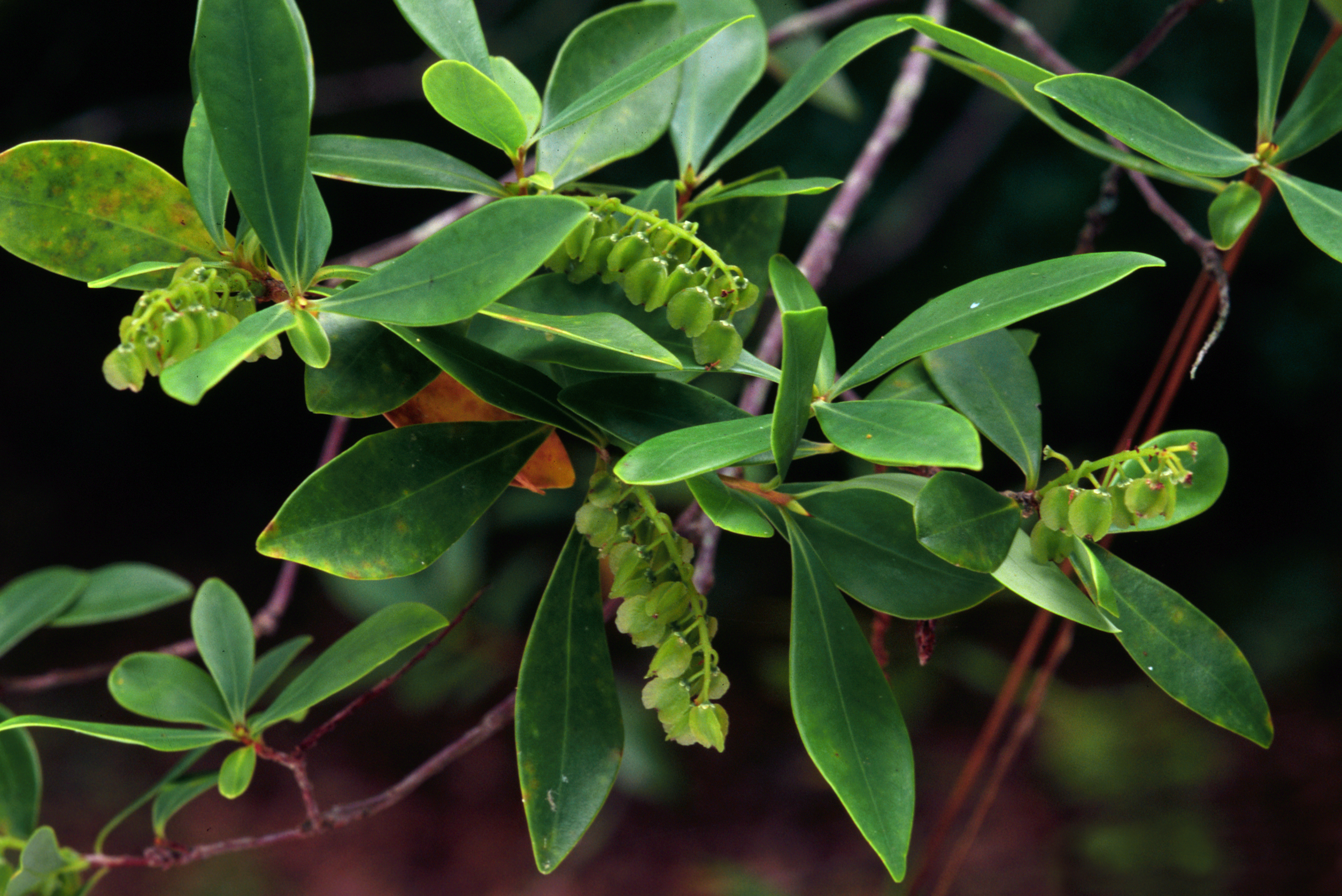

Conservation status
- Apparently Secure (NatureServe)

Scientific classification
- Kingdom: Plantae
- Clade: Tracheophytes
- Clade: Angiosperms
- Clade: Eudicots
- Clade: Asterids
- Order: Ericales
- Family: Cyrillaceae
- Genus: Cliftonia; Banks ex C.F.Gaertn.
- Species: C. monophylla

Binomial name
- Cliftonia monophylla (Lam.) Britton
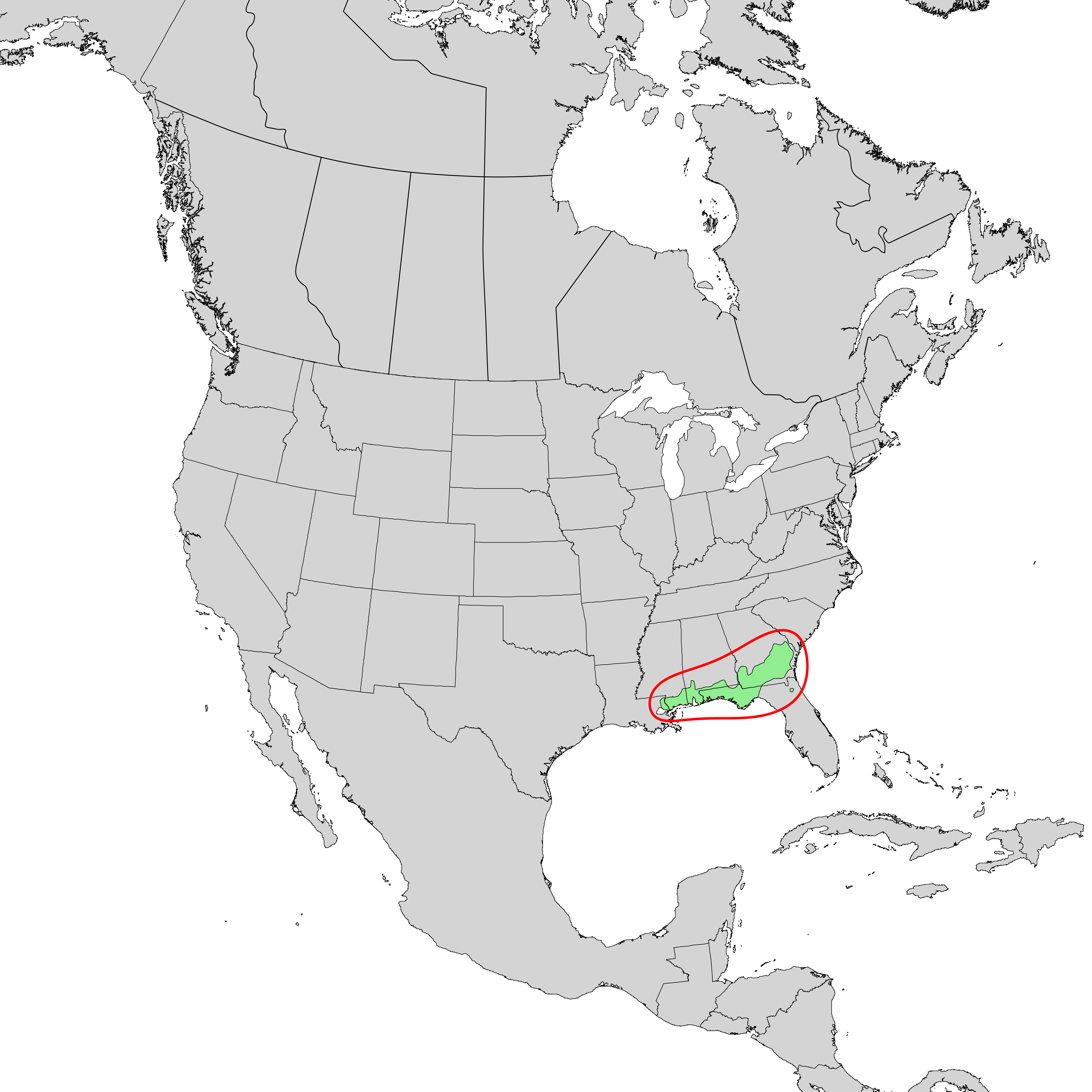
- Natural range of Cliftonia monophylla
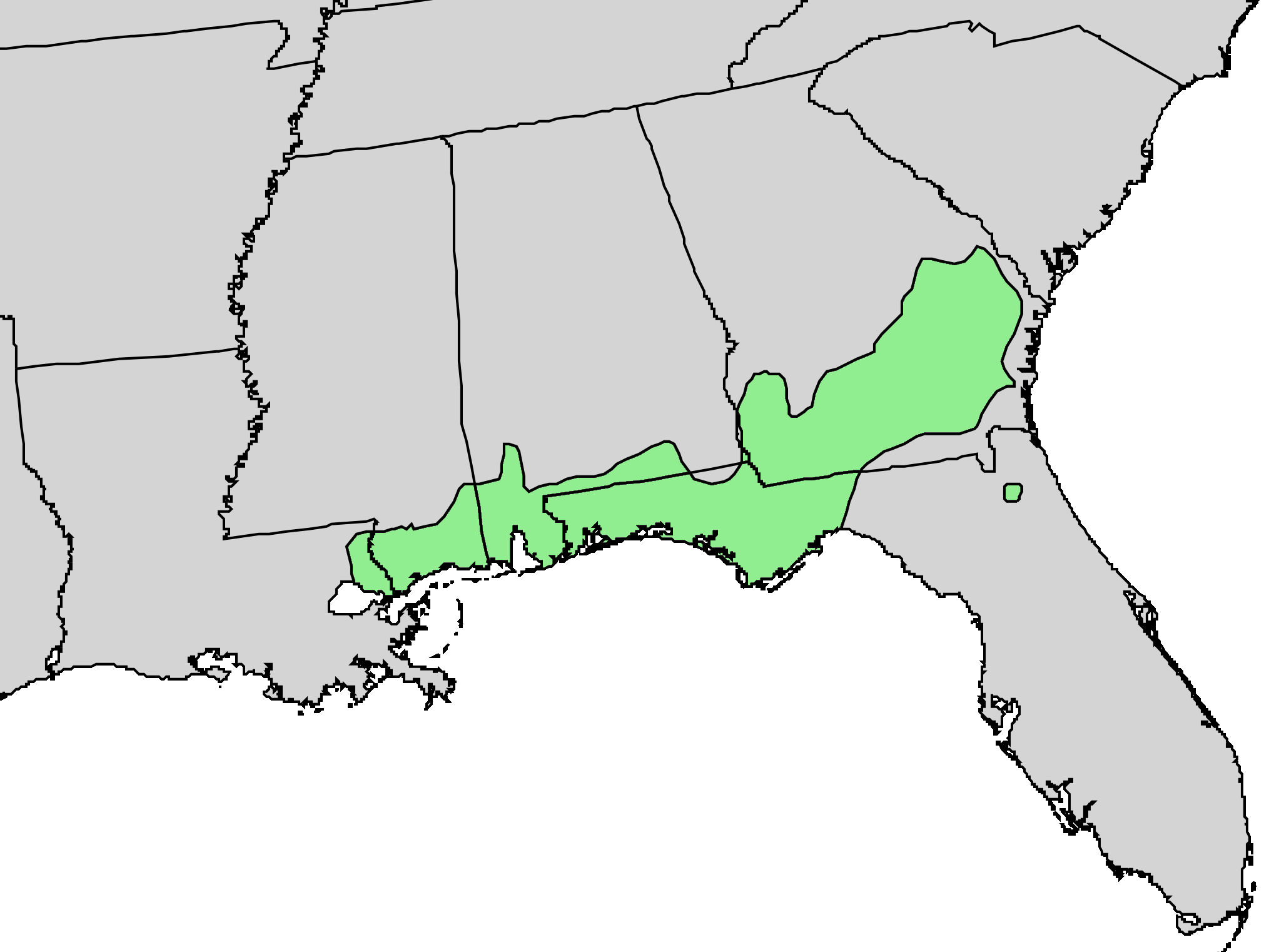
- Close-up of natural range of Cliftonia monophylla

= Cliftonia =

Genus of trees

Cliftonia monophylla, the buck-wheat tree, buckwheat tree or black titi, is a tree native to the southeastern United States. It is the sole species in the genus Cliftonia.

== Description ==
Cliftonia monophylla is a tree typically reaching a height of 18 feet (5.5 m) (some specimens grow to 45 feet (14 m)) with a crooked, multi-stemmed form. It is an evergreen with dark, shiny, thick leaves and white to pinkish, fragrant flower clusters.

Its fruits are "five winged drupes, yellowish and buckwheat shaped; hence the common name".

== Ecology ==
Cliftonia monophylla attracts pollinators such as honeybees and is also browsed by deer.

== Uses ==
Cliftonia monophylla has no known edible or medicinal uses.
