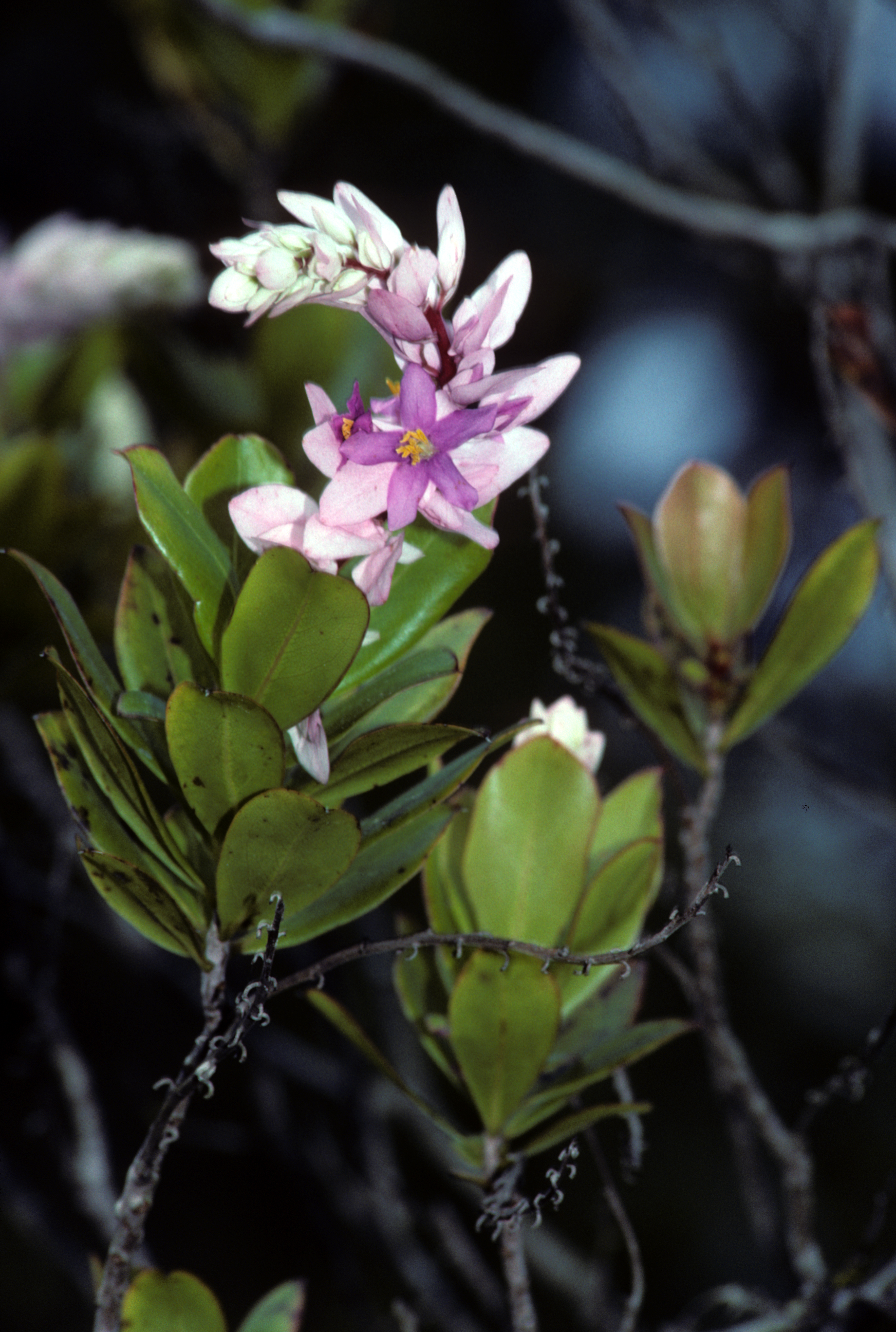
- Purdiaea cubensis var. cubensis

Scientific classification
- Kingdom: Plantae
- Clade: Tracheophytes
- Clade: Angiosperms
- Clade: Eudicots
- Clade: Asterids
- Order: Ericales
- Family: Clethraceae
- Genus: Purdiaea; Planch.

Synonyms
- Alloiosepalum Gilg; Costaea A.Rich.; Schizocardia A.C.Sm. & Standl.

= Purdiaea =

Genus of flowering plants

Purdiaea is a genus of flowering plants in the family Clethraceae described as a genus in 1846. It is one of two genera in this family, and was formerly classified in the related family Cyrillaceae. Purdiaea is native to tropical regions of the Caribbean (with the highest species diversity on Cuba), Central America and northern South America, further south than the related genus Clethra, the only other genus of this family.

The genus is composed of shrubs and small trees with alternating leaves.

Selected species

- Purdiaea belizensis (A.C.Sm. & Standl.) J.L.Thomas – "Belize purdiaea", Central America.
- Purdiaea cubensis (A.Rich.) Urb. – "Cuban purdiaea", "Clavellina", Southeast US, Cuba.
- Purdiaea ekmanii Vict. – Cuba
- Purdiaea microphylla Britton & P.Wilson – Cuba
- Purdiaea nipensis Vict. & León – Cuba
- Purdiaea nutans G.Planch. – Venezuela, Ecuador, Peru
- Purdiaea ophiticola Vict. – Cuba
- Purdiaea shaferi Britton – Cuba
- Purdiaea stenopetala Griseb. – Cuba
- Purdiaea tereosepala J.L.Thomas – Cuba
- Purdiaea velutina Britton & P.Wilson – Cuba
