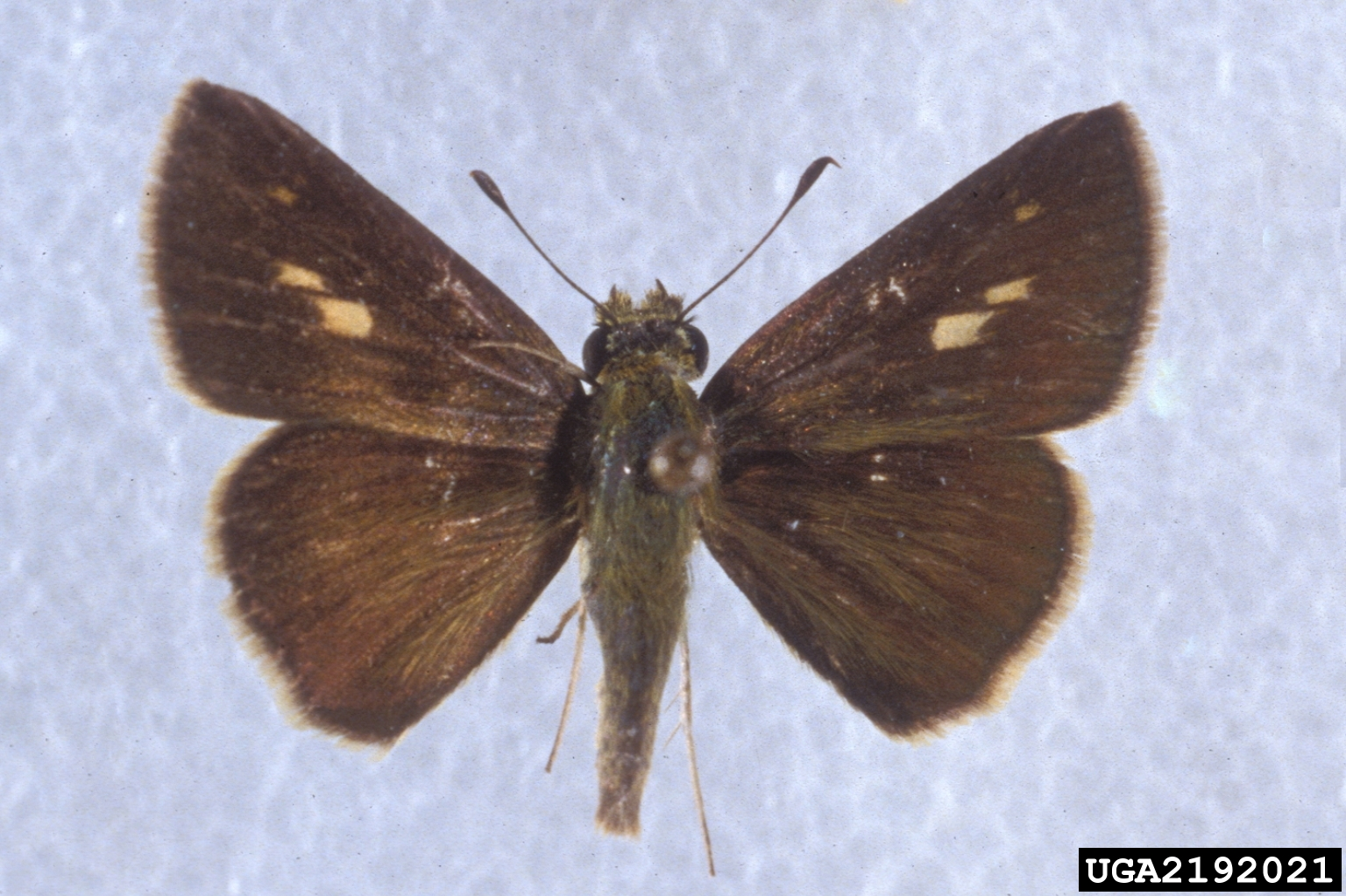

Conservation status
- Secure (NatureServe)

Scientific classification
- Kingdom: Animalia
- Phylum: Arthropoda
- Class: Insecta
- Order: Lepidoptera
- Family: Hesperiidae
- Genus: Wallengrenia
- Species: W. otho

Binomial name
- Wallengrenia otho (Smith, 1797)

Synonyms
- Papilio otho Smith, 1797; Thymelicus otho; Thymelicus pustula Hübner, [1819] (nom. nud.); Thymelicus pustula Geyer, 1832; Pamphila lacordairii Godman, 1900 (nom. nud.); Catia jobrea Dyar, 1918; Hesperia drury Latreille, [1824]; Catia druryi; Oligoria drurii; Hesperia clavus Erichson, 1848; Pamphila helva Möschler, 1877; Hesperia curassavica Snellen, 1887; Pamphila winslowi Weeks, 1906; Hesperia mago Herrich-Schäffer, 1863; Wallengrenia misera; Hesperia gemma Plötz, 1883; Pamphila ravola Godman & Salvin, 1884; Wallengrenia opthites; Wallengrenia gemma

= Wallengrenia otho =

Species of butterfly

Wallengrenia otho, the southern broken dash or broken dash skipper, is a butterfly of the family Hesperiidae. It was originally described by Smith in 1797. It is found from eastern Texas and the southeastern United States, south through the West Indies and Central America to Argentina. Strays can be found as far north as central Missouri, northern Kentucky and Delaware.

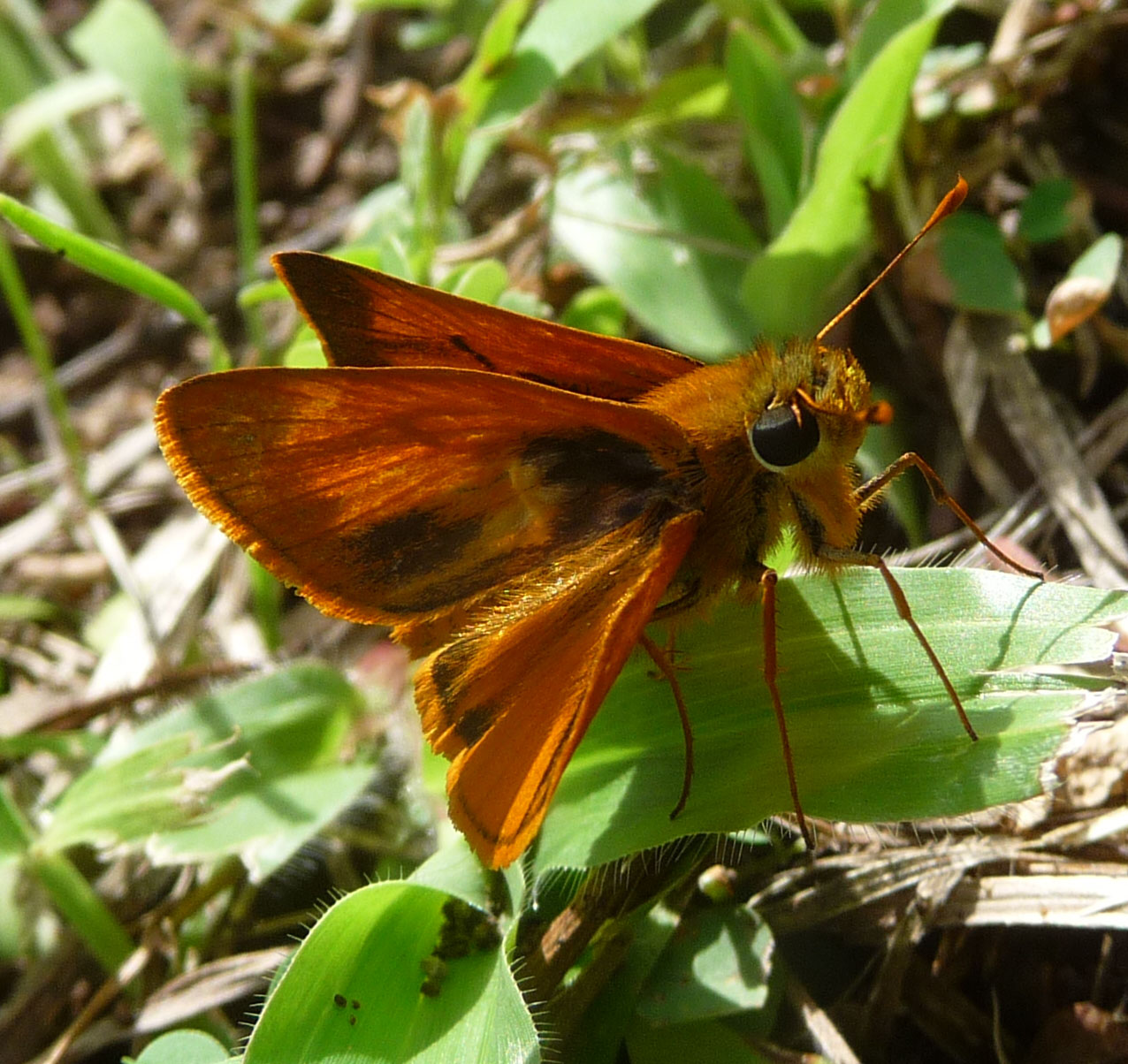
Wallengrenia otho ophites, male

The wingspan is 24–35 mm. Adults are on wing from April to October in two generations (sometimes a partial third) in most of North America. In peninsular Florida and southern Texas, adults are on wing all year round.

The larvae feed on Paspalum species and Stenotaphrum secundatum. Adults feed on the nectar from flowers including pickerelweed, selfheal and sweet pepperbush.

== Subspecies ==
There appears to be some uncertainty as to whether Wallengrenia egeremet is a subspecies of W. otho.

- Wallengrenia otho otho (Georgia to Mexico and Brazil (Amazonas))
- Wallengrenia otho drury (Latreille, [1824]) (Pennsylvania, Puerto Rico)
- Wallengrenia otho clavus (Erichson, 1848) (Mexico to Brazil, Trinidad, Guyana, Surinam, Venezuela)
- Wallengrenia otho misera (Lucas, 1857) (Cuba, Bahamas, Honduras)
- Wallengrenia otho ophites (Mabille, 1878) (Antilles, Dominica)
- Wallengrenia otho vesuria (Plötz, 1882) (Jamaica)
- Wallengrenia otho sapuca Evans, 1955 (Paraguay)
