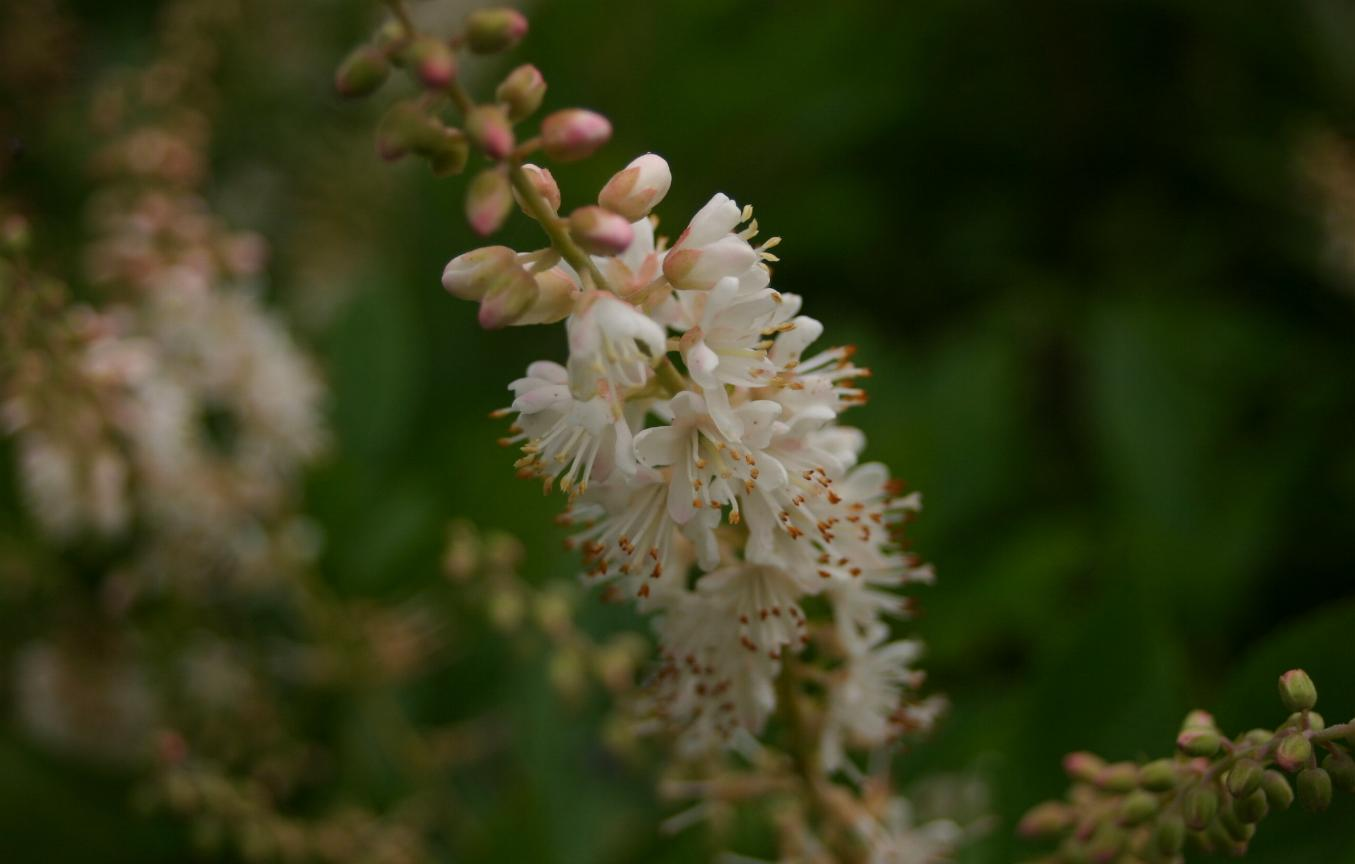

Conservation status
- Secure (NatureServe)

Scientific classification
- Kingdom: Plantae
- Clade: Tracheophytes
- Clade: Angiosperms
- Clade: Eudicots
- Clade: Asterids
- Order: Ericales
- Family: Clethraceae
- Genus: Clethra
- Species: C. alnifolia

Binomial name
- Clethra alnifolia L.

Synonyms
- Clethra angustifolia Raf. nom. illeg.; Clethra bracteata Raf.; Clethra dentata Aiton; Clethra incana Pers. nom. illeg.; Clethra paniculata Aiton; Clethra pubescens Willd.; Clethra pumila Raf.; Clethra tomentosa Lam.

= Clethra alnifolia =

Species of flowering plant

Clethra alnifolia, the coastal sweetpepperbush or summer sweet, is a species of flowering plant in the genus Clethra of the family Clethraceae, native to eastern North America from southern Nova Scotia and Maine south to northern Florida, and west to eastern Texas. It is a deciduous shrub which grows in wetlands, bogs and woodland streams.

== Description ==
Growing to 1.5–3 m (4 ft 11 in – 9 ft 10 in) tall, it is a deciduous shrub. The leaves are obovate to oblong, 4–10 cm long and 2–4 cm broad, with a serrated margin; they are green turning yellow-golden during the autumn. The leaves are alternately arranged. The flowers are white or very pale pink, 5–10 mm in diameter, and have a sweet, somewhat cloying fragrance. The flowers, which are attractive to bumblebees, are produced in racemes up to 15 cm long and 2 cm broad in late summer, depending on the cultivar. The scent of C. alnifolia is described as sweet. The "pepper" part of the common name derives from the mature fruits, capsules which have a vague resemblance to peppercorns, however with no element of spiciness.

== Habitat ==
It grows in wet forests, pine flatwoods, wetlands, bogs and can be seen alongside woodland streams. It has moderate salt tolerance and can be found inland in coastal areas. It prefers a neutral to acidic soil. The Nova Scotian disjunct population is small and endangered, and C. alnifolia is listed as a threatened species under the Canadian Species at Risk Act.

== Etymology ==
The Latin specific epithet alnifolia means "with leaves like alder (Alnus)". This gave rise to another common name, common white alder, though the two plants are not closely related.

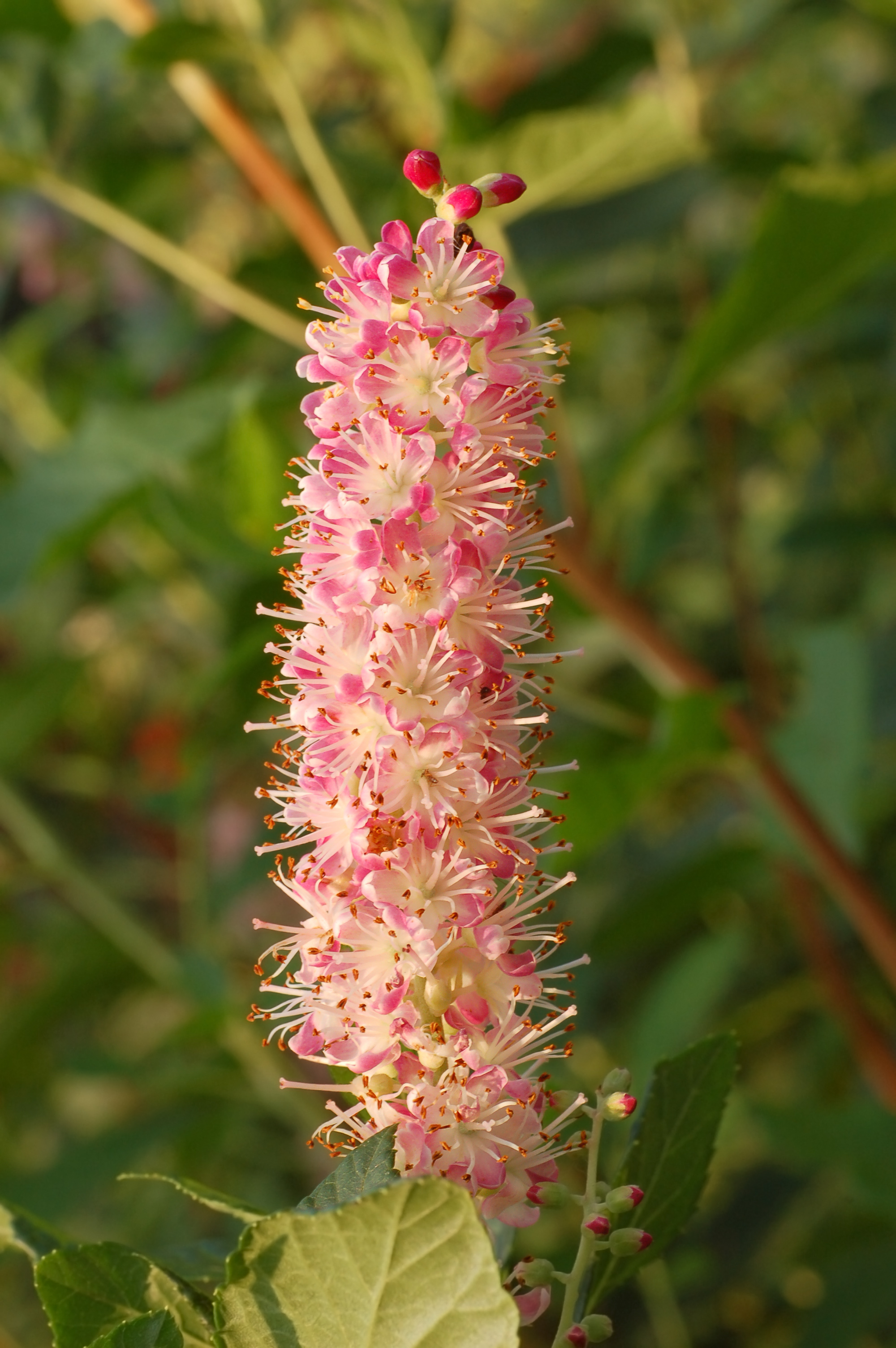
'Ruby Spice' flowers

== Cultivation ==
C. alnifolia is typically used as a shrub for natural gardens, or is placed alongside a stream or pond to delay erosion. It does not leaf out until very late in the season, limiting its landscaping use. Several cultivars have been selected for garden use, including 'September Beauty'. Both 'Ruby Spice', with strongly pink flowers, and the dwarf 'Hummingbird' have gained the Royal Horticultural Society's Award of Garden Merit (confirmed 2017).
