= Pentamerista =

Scientific classification
- Kingdom: Plantae
- Clade: Tracheophytes
- Clade: Angiosperms
- Clade: Eudicots
- Clade: Asterids
- Order: Ericales
- Family: Tetrameristaceae
- Genus: Pentamerista; Maguire
- Species: P. neotropica

Binomial name
- Pentamerista neotropica Maguire

Genus of plants

Pentamerista is a monotypic genus of flowering plants belonging to the family Tetrameristaceae. The only species is Pentamerista neotropica.

Its native range is Colombia to Venezuela and Northern Brazil.
