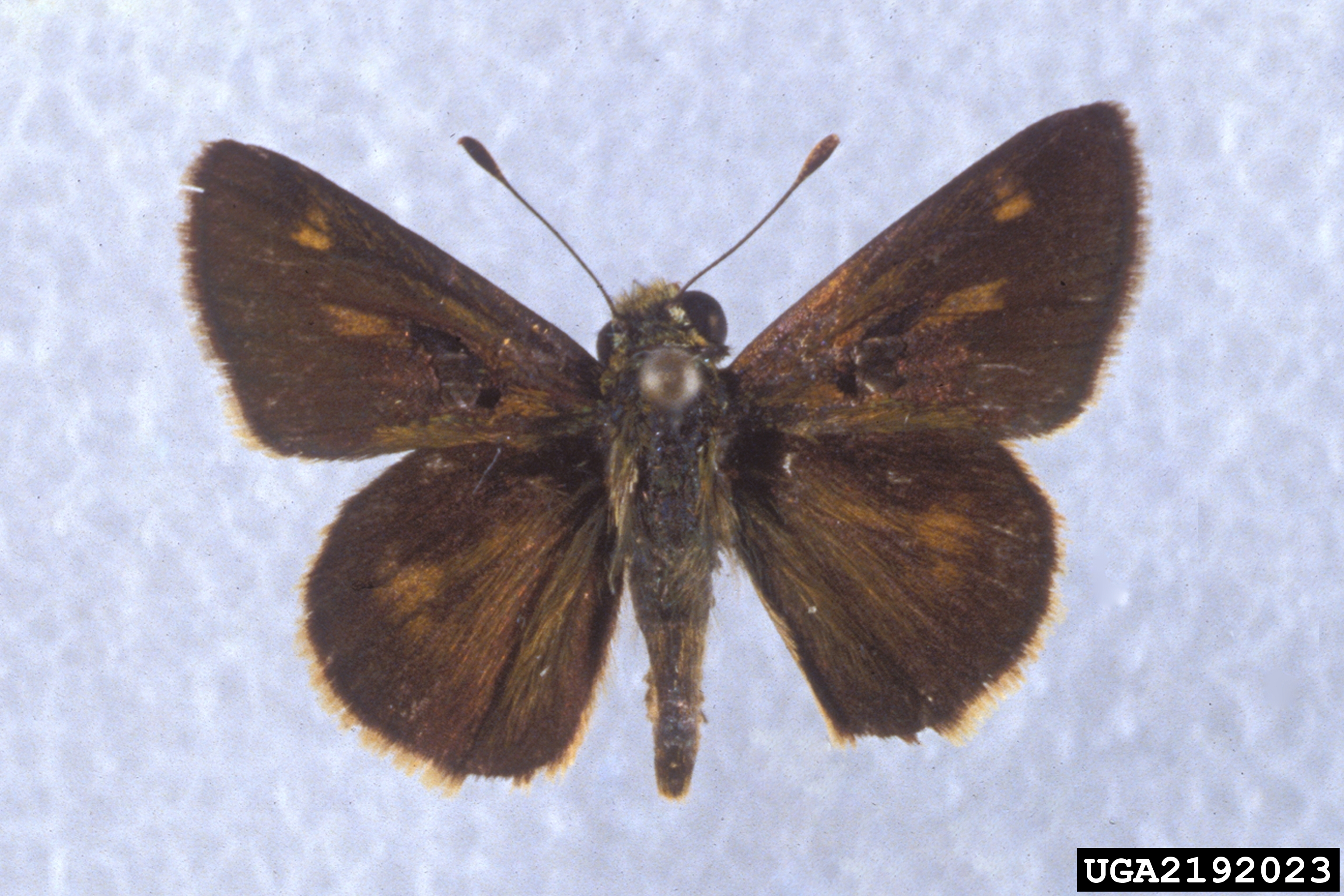

Conservation status
- Secure (NatureServe)

Scientific classification
- Kingdom: Animalia
- Phylum: Arthropoda
- Class: Insecta
- Order: Lepidoptera
- Family: Hesperiidae
- Genus: Wallengrenia
- Species: W. egeremet

Binomial name
- Wallengrenia egeremet (Scudder, 1863)

Synonyms
- Hesperia egeremet Scudder, 1863; Thymelicus aetna Scudder, 1872; Pamphila ursa Worthington, 1880; Wallengrenia cinna (Plötz, 1883)

= Wallengrenia egeremet =

Species of butterfly

Wallengrenia egeremet, the northern broken dash , is a butterfly of the family Hesperiidae. It is found in North America from southern Maine and southern Ontario, west across the Great Lakes states to southeastern North Dakota, south to central Florida, the Gulf Coast and south-eastern Texas.

The wingspan is 25–39 mm. Adults are on wing from June to August in one generation in most of the range. There are two generations with adults on wing from May to October in the deep south and eastern Texas.

The larvae feed on various Panicum species, including Panicum clandestinum and Panicum dichotomum. Adults feed on the nectar of white, pink or purple flowers, including dogbane, red clover, New Jersey tea and sweet pepperbush.

There appears to be some uncertainty in which genus this species belongs to, with NatureServe recognizing it as a member of the genus Polites. Furthermore, it appears some believe this species is a subspecies of Wallengrenia otho.
