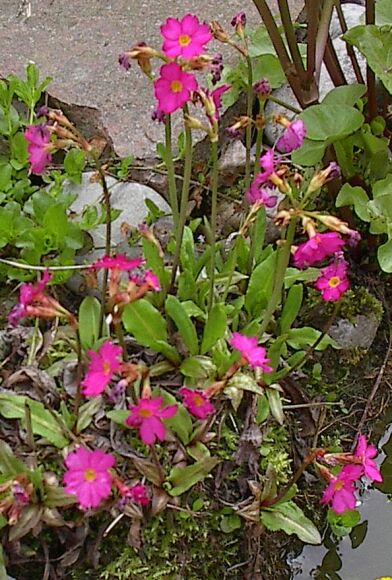

Scientific classification
- Kingdom: Plantae
- Clade: Embryophytes
- Clade: Tracheophytes
- Clade: Spermatophytes
- Clade: Angiosperms
- Clade: Eudicots
- Clade: Asterids
- Order: Ericales
- Family: Primulaceae
- Genus: Primula
- Species: P. rosea

Binomial name
- Primula rosea Royle; Illustrations of the Botany of the Himalayan Mountains. 1(9):311. 1836; 2(4): t. 76, fig. 1. 1834

= Primula rosea =

Species of flowering plant

Primula rosea, the rosy primrose, is a flowering plant species in the genus Primula, native to the Himalayas. Growing to 50 cm (20 in) tall, it is a hardy herbaceous perennial with red-tinged leaves and clumps of rich pink flowers in spring.

In cultivation it prefers damp places such as the edge of a pond or stream, in moisture-retentive neutral or acid soil and full or partial sunlight. It has won the Royal Horticultural Society's Award of Garden Merit.

Rosinidin is an anthocyanidin found in P. rosea.

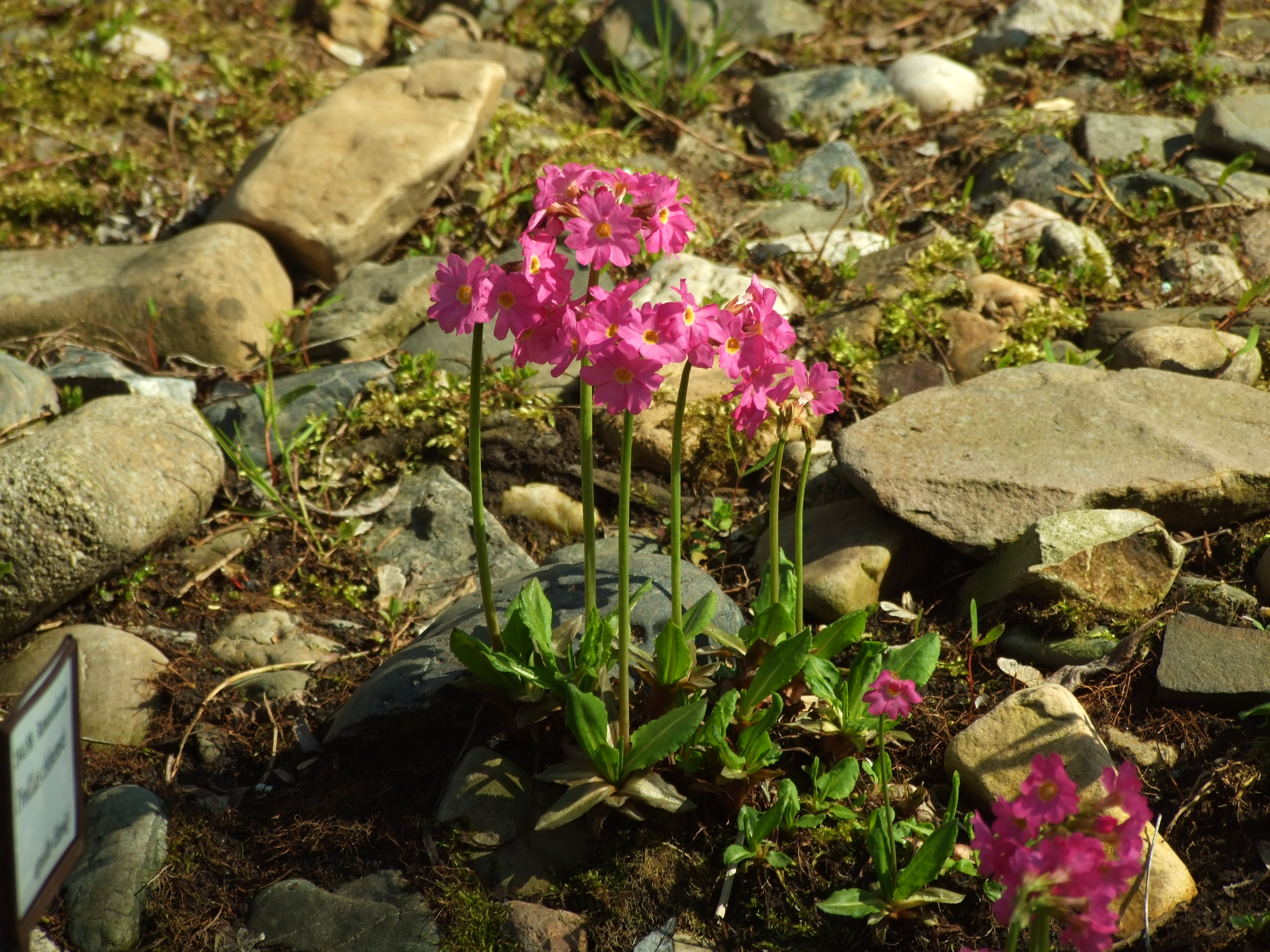

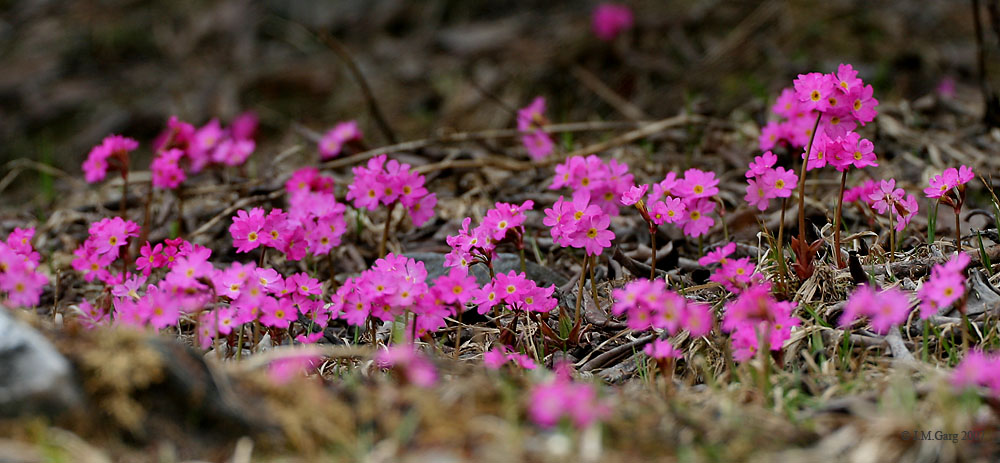

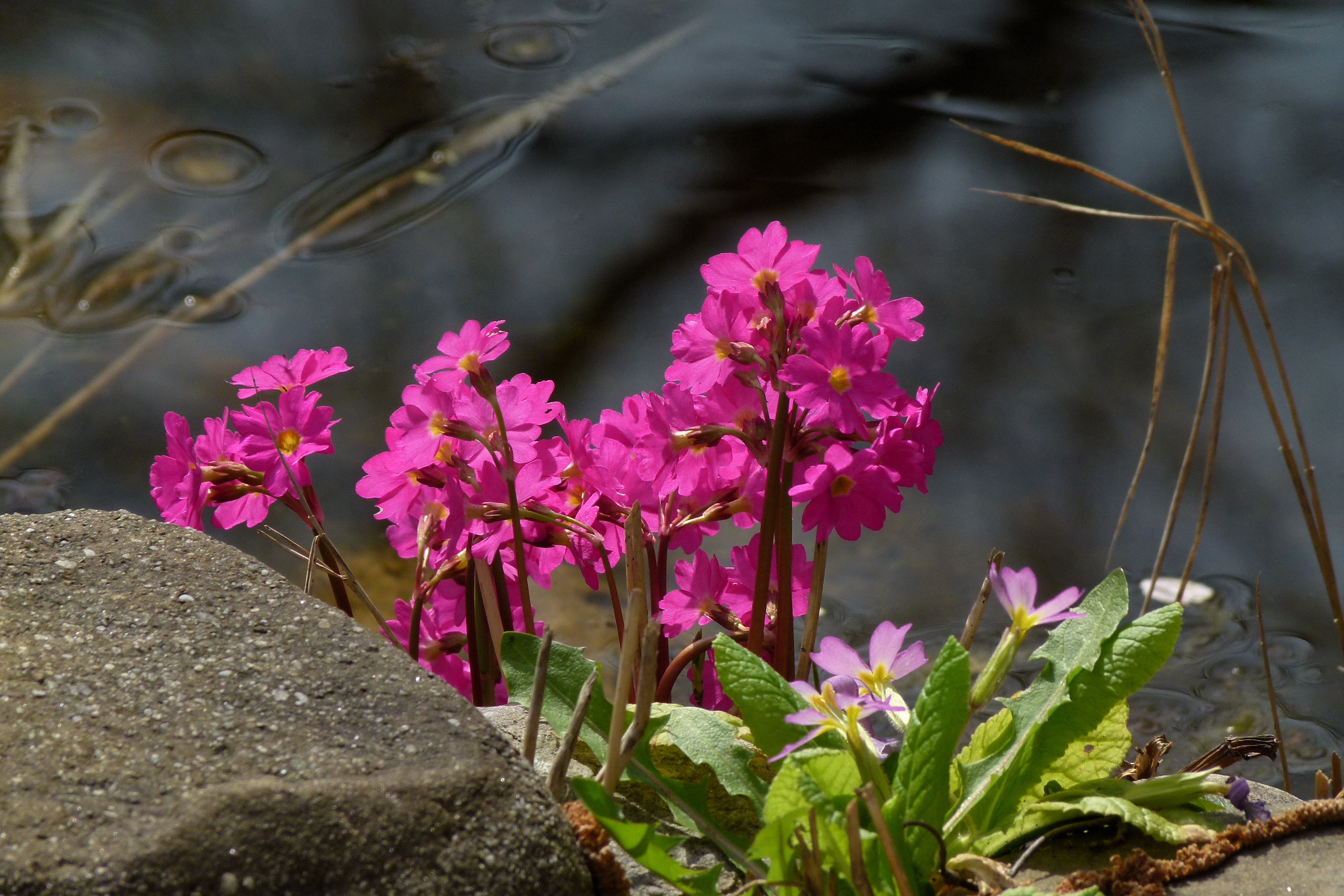

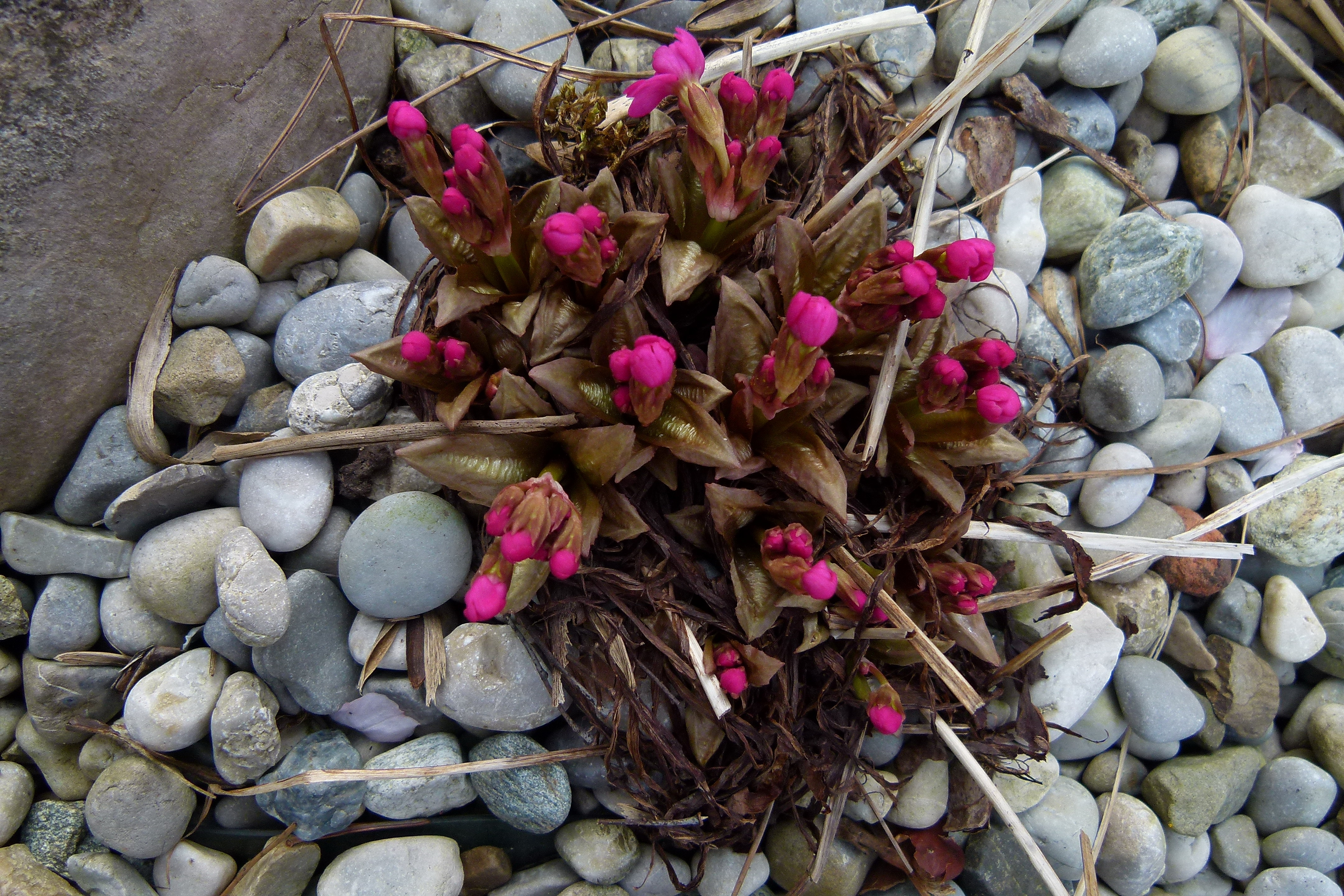
