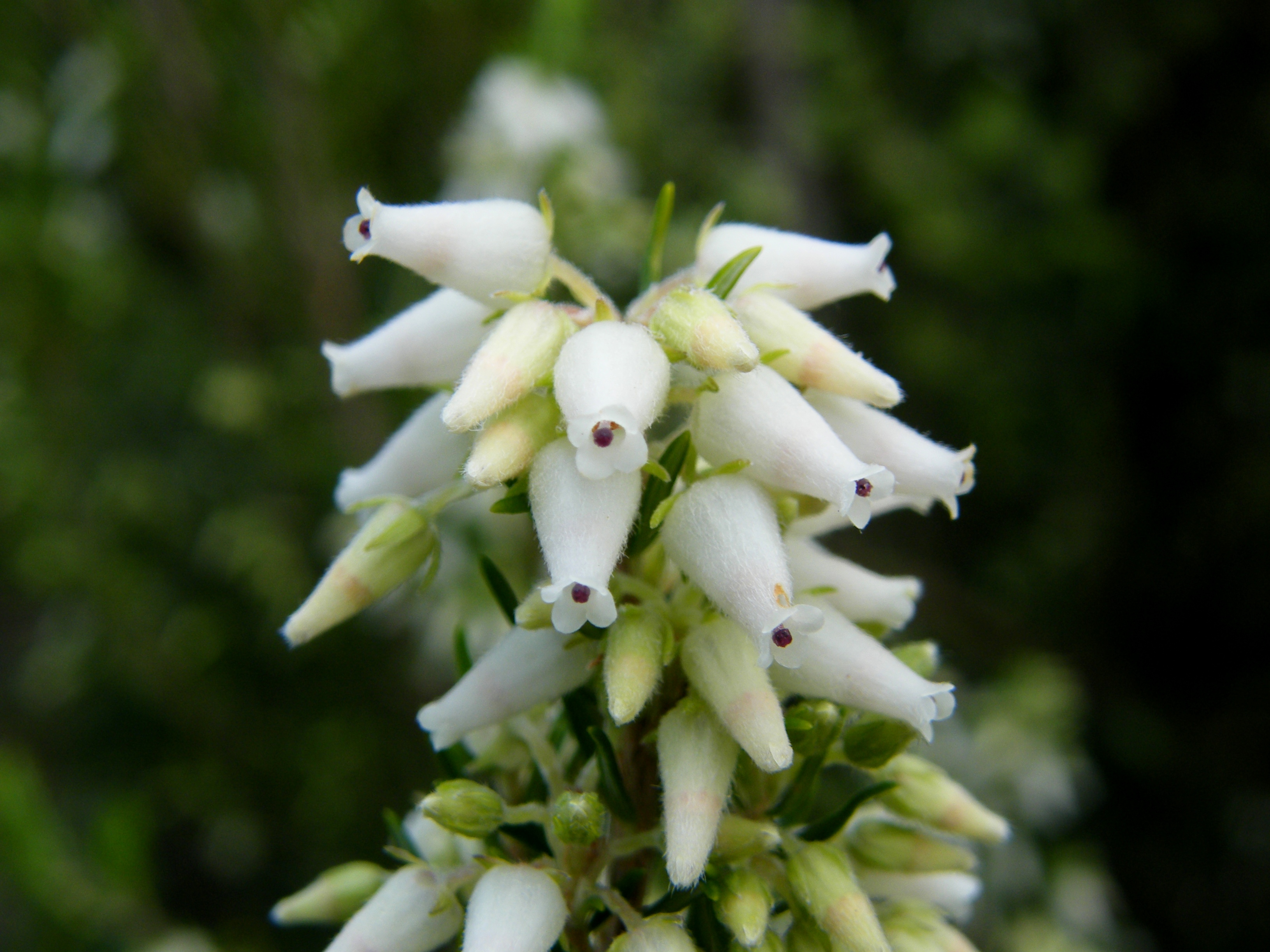

Conservation status
- Least Concern (IUCN 3.1)

Scientific classification
- Kingdom: Plantae
- Clade: Tracheophytes
- Clade: Angiosperms
- Clade: Eudicots
- Clade: Asterids
- Order: Ericales
- Family: Ericaceae
- Genus: Erica
- Species: E. afra

Binomial name
- Erica afra L., 1753

Varieties
- Erica afra var. afra; Erica afra var. auricularis (Salisb.) Bolus

Synonyms
- Erica caffra

= Erica afra =

Species of flowering plant

Erica afra, the water heath, is a species of flowering plant in the genus Erica. It's a small tree, sometimes a shrub, that grows in riparian habitats and on forest edges and occurs from the Western Cape to the Drakensberg of KwaZulu-Natal and Lesotho. The tree's flowers look like bells. The tree's national tree number is 572.

== Taxonomy ==
The etymology of the original species name caffra is related to kaffir, an ethnic slur used towards black people in Africa. At the July 2024 International Botanical Congress, a vote was held with the result that "caffra" related names will be emended to afra related ones, with the implementation of this being done at the end of July 2024.
