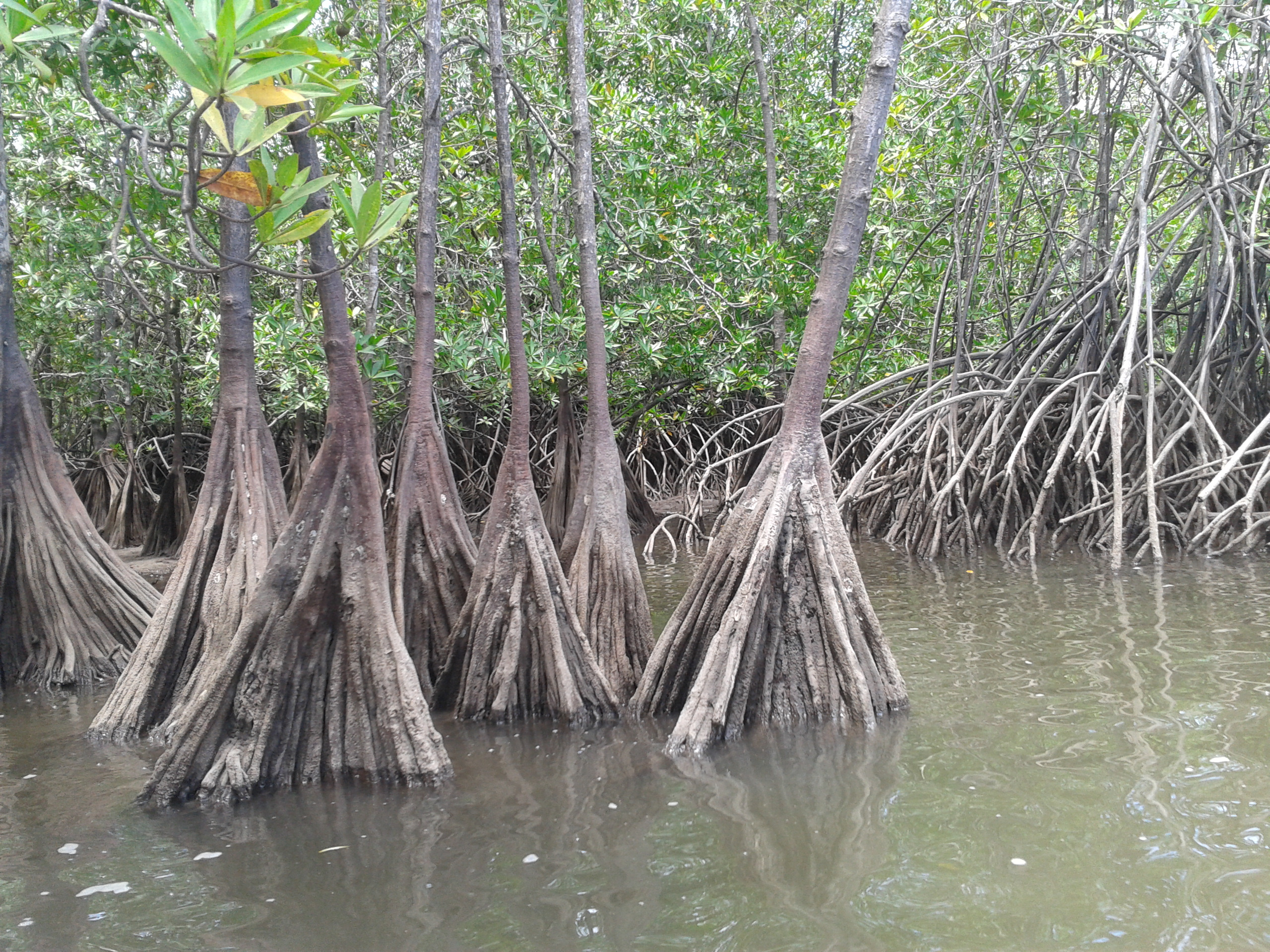
- Pelliciera rhizophorae

Scientific classification
- Kingdom: Plantae
- Clade: Tracheophytes
- Clade: Angiosperms
- Clade: Eudicots
- Clade: Asterids
- Order: Ericales
- Family: Tetrameristaceae; Hutch.

Genera
- See text

= Tetrameristaceae =

Family of flowering plants

Tetrameristaceae is a family of flowering plants. The family consists of three species, of trees or shrubs, in three genera:

- Pelliciera in Central and South America
- Pentamerista in the Guyanas
- Tetramerista in Southeast Asia

The APG II system places this family in the order Ericales, of the asterids.

In the APG III system, the genus Pelliciera, previously treated as its own family, Pellicieraceae, is included in Tetrameristaceae.
