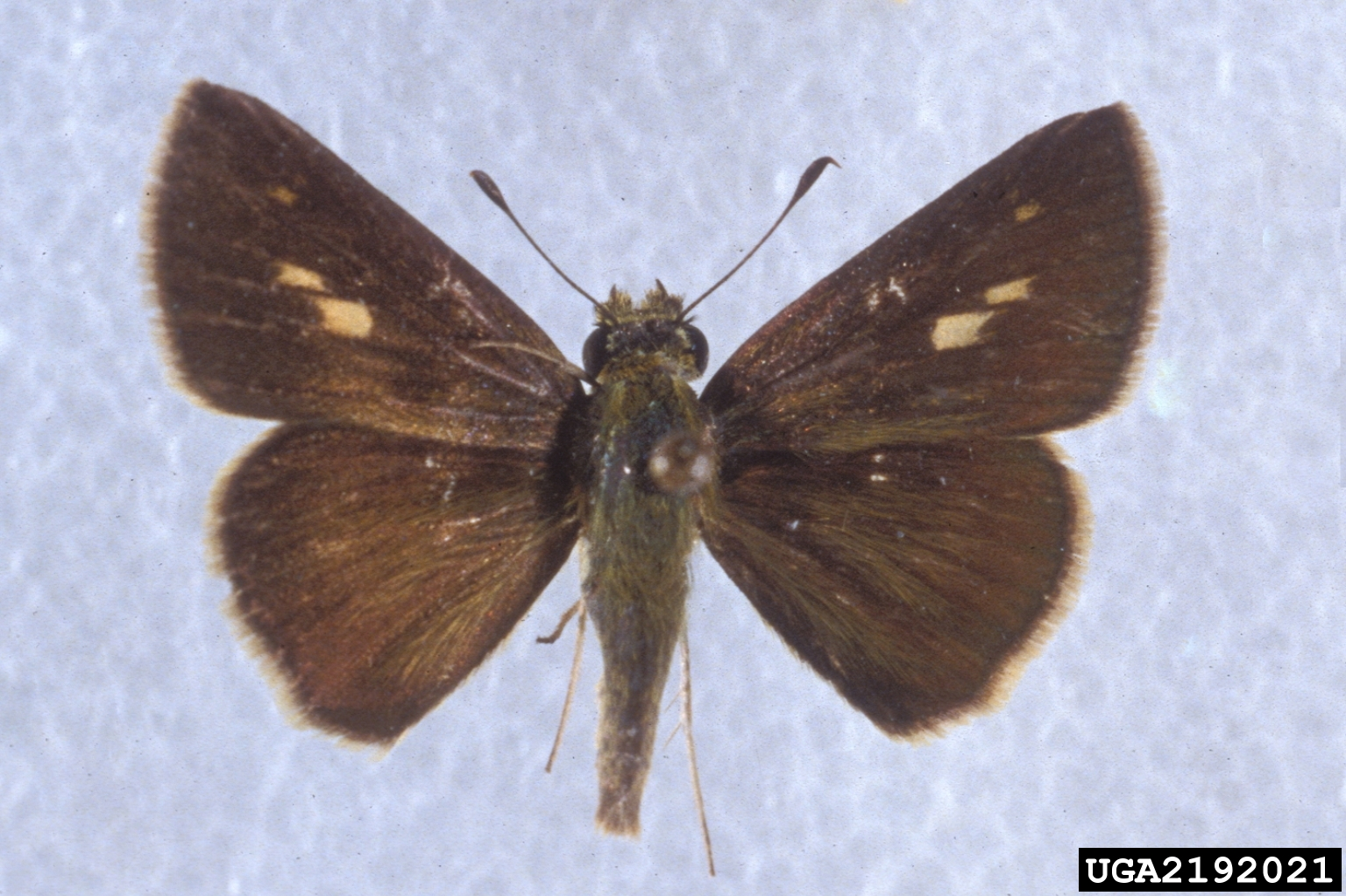
- Wallengrenia otho

Scientific classification
- Kingdom: Animalia
- Phylum: Arthropoda
- Class: Insecta
- Order: Lepidoptera
- Family: Hesperiidae
- Tribe: Hesperiini
- Genus: Wallengrenia; Berg, 1897

Synonyms
- Catia Godman, [1900]

= Wallengrenia =

Genus of butterflies

Wallengrenia is a genus of skippers in the family Hesperiidae.

== Species ==
- Wallengrenia otho (Smith, 1797)
- Wallengrenia egeremet (Scudder, 1863)
- Wallengrenia premnas (Wallengren, 1860)
