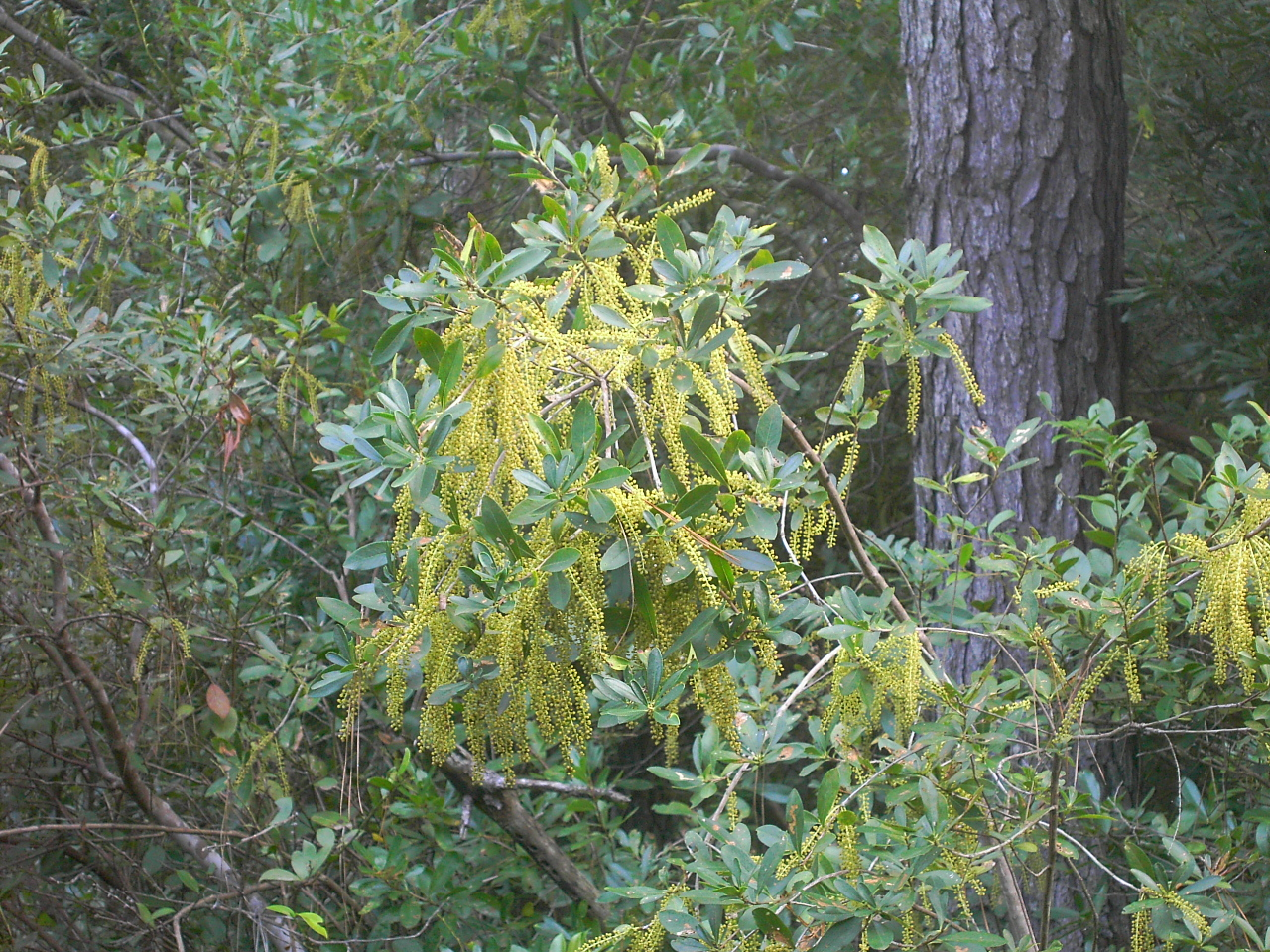
- Cyrilla racemiflora in Myrtle Beach, SC

Scientific classification
- Kingdom: Plantae
- Clade: Tracheophytes
- Clade: Angiosperms
- Clade: Eudicots
- Clade: Asterids
- Order: Ericales
- Family: Cyrillaceae; Lindl.

Genera
- Cliftonia; Cyrilla

= Cyrillaceae =

Family of flowering plants

The Cyrillaceae are a small family of flowering plants in the order Ericales, native to warm temperate to tropical regions of the Americas. The family comprises two genera, Cliftonia and Cyrilla, each containing a single species, Cliftonia monophylla and Cyrilla racemiflora. However, additional species of Cyrilla are now often recognized and the genus is in need of taxonomic revision.

In the past, many botanists included a third genus, Purdiaea, in the family, though recent research has shown this genus is better placed in the closely related family Clethraceae.

== Fossil record ==
Fossil Cyrilla and Cliftonia leaves, wood and pollen have been reported from the Neogene Lower Rhine region brown coal. Leaf fragments of Cyrilla have been found frequently in brown coals of central Europe. The Cyrillaceae formed part of the Tertiary bog flora where they constituted an important component of the shrubby vegetation. Among fossil Cyrilla from the Tertiary of Europe is †Cyrilla thomsonii described from the Miocene of Librar, Germany and the Bełchatów, Poland. † Cyrilla hungarica described from the Miocene of Magyaregregy in Hungary.
