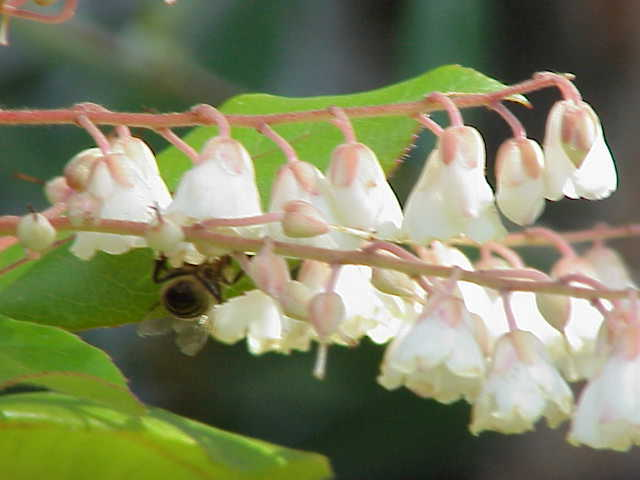
- Clethra arborea flowers

Scientific classification
- Kingdom: Plantae
- Clade: Tracheophytes
- Clade: Angiosperms
- Clade: Eudicots
- Clade: Asterids
- Order: Ericales
- Family: Clethraceae
- Genus: Clethra; L.

Type species
- Clethra alnifolia L.

Species
- See text

Synonyms
- Junia Adans., illegitimate superfluous name, not Raf. 1840 (Saxifragaceae); Volkameria P.Browne 1756, illegitimate homonym, not L. 1753 (Lamiaceae) nor L. ex Kuntze 1898 (Pedaliaceae) nor Heist. ex Fabr. 1759 (Lamiaceae); Tinus L. 1759, illegitimate homonym, not Mill. 1754 (Caprifoliaceae) nor Kuntze 1891 (Primulaceae); Gillena Adans. 1763, illegitimate superfluous name; Cuellaria Ruiz & Pav.; Crossophrys Klotzsch; Kowalewskia Turcz.

= Clethra =

Genus of flowering plants

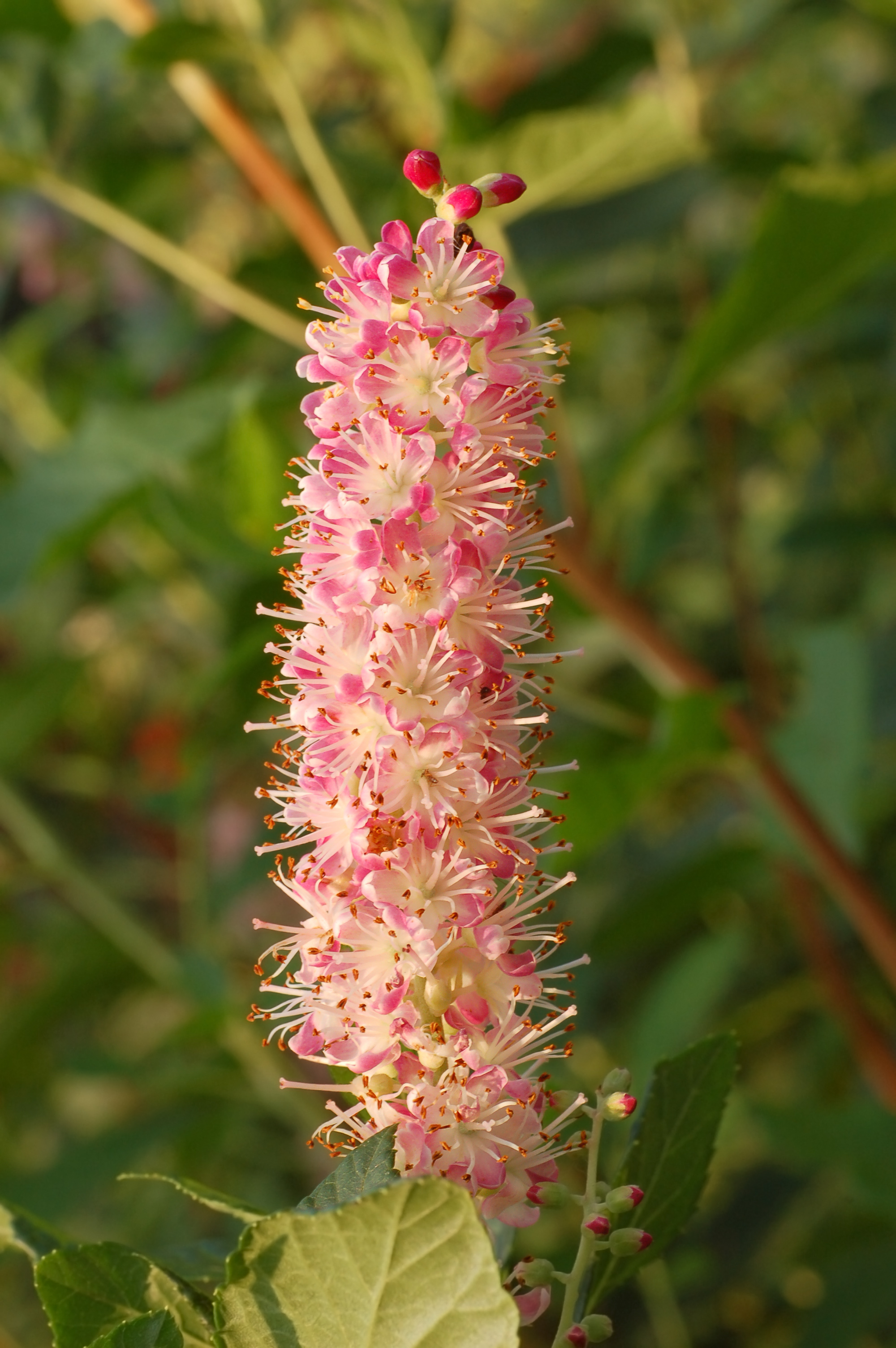
Clethra alnifolia 'Ruby spice'

Clethra is a genus of flowering shrubs or small trees erected as a genus by Linnaeus in 1753.

Clethra is one of two genera in the family Clethraceae (the other being Purdiaea). The species may be evergreen or deciduous, and all bear flowers in clusters (inflorescences), which correspond to racemes or panicles. The flowers are quite small, white or pinkish, and each bear five free petals, numerous stamens, and a three-chambered seed capsule. The leaves, simple, ovate, and alternate or opposite, bear characteristic stellate hairs. The seeds are very small and numerous.

== Distribution ==
Clethra species are native to a variety of habitats, including swamps, woodland, and rocky sites from temperate to tropical climates in eastern and southeastern Asia, Malesia, North and South America, and one species (C. arborea) on the Atlantic island of Madeira.

== Fossil record ==
Several fossil fruits and seeds of †Clethra cimbrica have been described from middle Miocene strata of the Fasterholt area near Silkeborg in Central Jutland, Denmark.

== Species ==
The number of species accepted varies between different authorities depending on taxonomic interpretation, but with a recent trend to reduce the number recognised as distinct. The recent Flora of China (series) has cut the number accepted for China from 35 to seven species, and the US Department of Agriculture recognises only two in the United States, synonymising C. tomentosa with C. alnifolia. The following are accepted by the World Checklist of Selected Plant Families:

- Clethra acuminata – mountain pepper bush; S Appalachians (Alabama to Pennsylvania)
- Clethra alcoceri – Hidalgo, Jalisco
- Clethra alexandri – Jamaica
- Clethra alnifolia – sweet pepper bush or summer sweet; S + E United States (Texas to Maine)
- Clethra arborea – lily of the valley tree; Madeira, Canary Islands†, Azores
- Clethra arfakana – New Guinea
- Clethra barbinervis – Japanese sweet shrub; SE China, Korea, Japan
- Clethra bodinieri – S China
- Clethra canescens – Philippines, E + C Indonesia, New Guinea
  - var. clementis – Borneo
- Clethra castaneifolia – Peru
- Clethra chiapensis – Chiapas
- Clethra consimilis – Panama, Costa Rica
- Clethra conzattiana – Oaxaca
- Clethra crispa – Ecuador
- Clethra cubensis – Cuba
- Clethra cuneata – Peru, Bolivia
- Clethra delavayi – SW China, Assam, Myanmar, Bhutan, Vietnam
- Clethra elongata – Peru, Bolivia
- Clethra fabri – S China, Vietnam
- Clethra fagifolia – Ecuador, Colombia, Venezuela
- Clethra fargesii – C China
- Clethra ferruginea – Peru
- Clethra fimbriata – Peru, Ecuador, Colombia
- Clethra formosa – Costa Rica
- Clethra fragrans – Jalisco, Michoacán, Guerrero
- Clethra galeottiana – Puebla, Oaxaca, Chiapas
- Clethra gelida – Costa Rica, Panama, Honduras
- Clethra guyanensis – Guyana, Venezuela
- Clethra hartwegii – C + S Mexico
- Clethra hendersonii – Peninsular Malaysia
- Clethra hirsutovillosa – Guerrero
- Clethra hondurensis – Tabasco to Costa Rica
- Clethra javanica – Java, Bali, Lombok, Timor
- Clethra kaipoensis – SE China
- Clethra kebarensis – New Guinea
- Clethra licanioides – Guatemala, Honduras
- Clethra longispicata J.J.Sm. – Borneo, Philippines, Sulawesi, Maluku
- Clethra luzmariae – Oaxaca
- Clethra macrophylla – Veracruz, Puebla
- Clethra mexicana – C + S Mexico, Central America, Colombia, Venezuela, Trinidad
- Clethra oaxacana – Oaxaca
- Clethra obovata – Ecuador, Peru
- Clethra occidentalis – Jamaica
- Clethra oleoides – C + S Mexico, Central America
- Clethra ovalifolia – Colombia, Venezuela, Ecuador, Peru
- Clethra pachecoana – Chiapas to Honduras
- Clethra pachyphylla – Borneo
- Clethra papuana – New Guinea
- Clethra paralelinervia – Ecuador
- Clethra × parvifolia – Chiapas
- Clethra pedicellaris – Colombia, Ecuador, Peru
- Clethra peruviana – Ecuador, Peru
- Clethra petelotii – Vietnam, Yunnan
- Clethra poilanei – Laos
- Clethra pringlei – Mexican summersweet – Mexico
- Clethra pulgarensis – Palawan
- Clethra purpusii – Oaxaca, Chiapas
- Clethra pyrogena – Panama, Costa Rica
- Clethra repanda – Colombia, Venezuela
- Clethra retivenia – Peru
- Clethra revoluta – Colombia, Bolivia, Ecuador, Peru
- Clethra rosei – Mexico
- Clethra rugosa – Colombia, Ecuador
- Clethra scabra – Brazil, Bolivia, Paraguay, NW Argentina
- Clethra skutchii – Guatemala
- Clethra sleumeriana – Hunan
- Clethra suaveolens – S Mexico, Central America
- Clethra sumatrana – Sumatra
- Clethra sumbawaensis – Lesser Sunda Islands
- Clethra symingtonii – Perak
- Clethra talamancana – Costa Rica
- Clethra tomentella – Philippines
- Clethra tutensis – Panama
- Clethra tuxtlensis – Veracruz
- Clethra uleana – S Brazil
- Clethra vicentina – S Mexico, Central America
