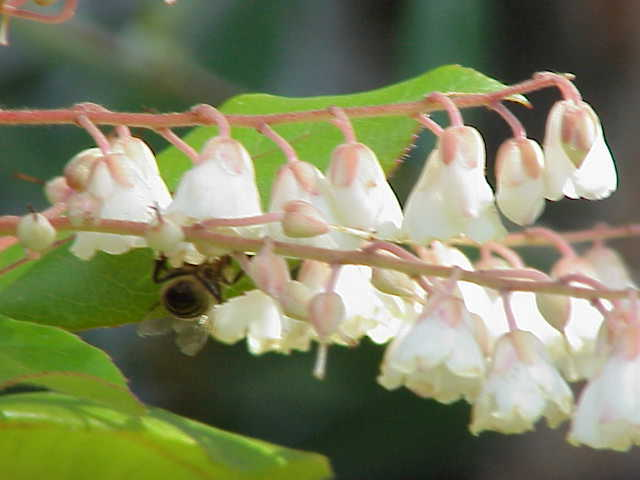
- Clethra arborea flowers

Scientific classification
- Kingdom: Plantae
- Clade: Tracheophytes
- Clade: Angiosperms
- Clade: Eudicots
- Clade: Asterids
- Order: Ericales
- Family: Clethraceae; Klotzsch

Genera
- Clethra; Purdiaea

= Clethraceae =

Family of flowering plants

The Clethraceae are a small family of flowering plants in the order Ericales, composed of two genera, Clethra and Purdiaea, with approximately 75 species. They are native to warm temperate to tropical regions of Asia and the Americas, with one species also on Madeira.

In the past, most botanists included only Clethra in the family, but recent research has shown Purdiaea, previously placed in the closely related family Cyrillaceae, is more closely allied to Clethra.
