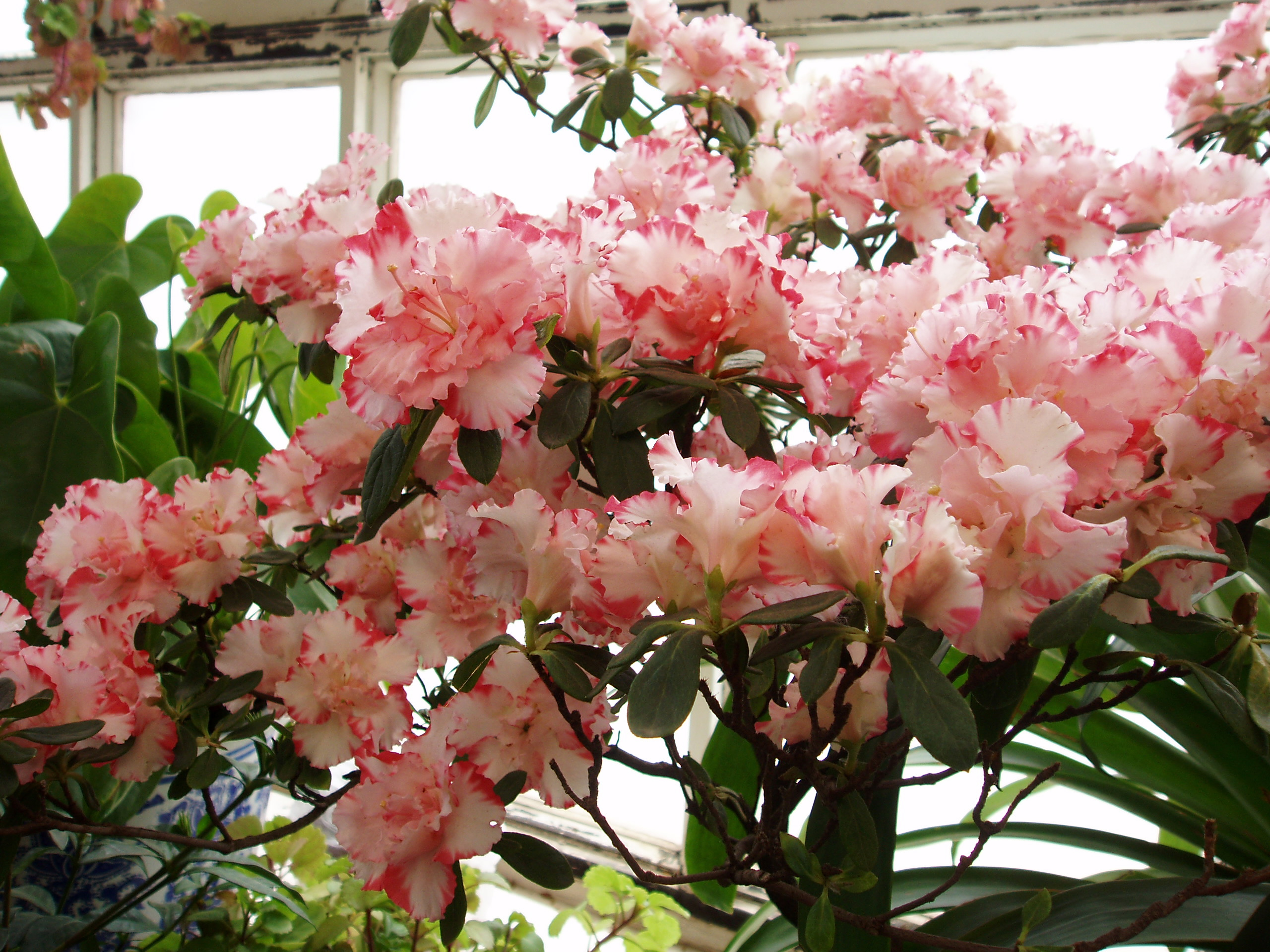
- Rhododendron simsii

Scientific classification
- Kingdom: Plantae
- Clade: Tracheophytes
- Clade: Angiosperms
- Clade: Eudicots
- Clade: Asterids
- Order: Ericales; Bercht. & J.Presl

Families
- Actinidiaceae; Balsaminaceae; Clethraceae; Cyrillaceae; Diapensiaceae; Ebenaceae; Ericaceae; Fouquieriaceae; Lecythidaceae; Marcgraviaceae; Mitrastemonaceae; Pentaphylacaceae; Polemoniaceae; Primulaceae; Roridulaceae; Sapotaceae; Sarraceniaceae; Sladeniaceae; Styracaceae; Symplocaceae; Tetrameristaceae; Theaceae

= Ericales =

Order of eudicot flowering plants

The Ericales are a large and diverse order of flowering plants in the asterid group of the eudicots. Well-known and economically important members of this order include tea and ornamental camellias, persimmon, ebony, blueberry, cranberry, lingonberry, huckleberry, kiwifruit, Brazil nut, argan, sapote, azaleas and rhododendrons, heather, heath, impatiens, phlox, Jacob's ladder, primroses, cyclamens, shea, sapodilla, pouterias, and trumpet pitchers.

== Description ==
The Ericales include trees, bushes, lianas, and herbaceous plants. Together with ordinary autophytic plants, they include chlorophyll-deficient mycoheterotrophic plants (e.g., Sarcodes sanguinea) and carnivorous plants (e.g., genus Sarracenia). Mycorrhizal associations are quite common among the order representatives, and three kinds of mycorrhiza are found exclusively among Ericales (namely, ericoid, arbutoid and monotropoid mycorrhiza). In addition, some families among the order are notable for their exceptional ability to accumulate aluminum.

Many species have five petals, often grown together. Fusion of the petals as a trait was traditionally used to place the order in the subclass Sympetalae.

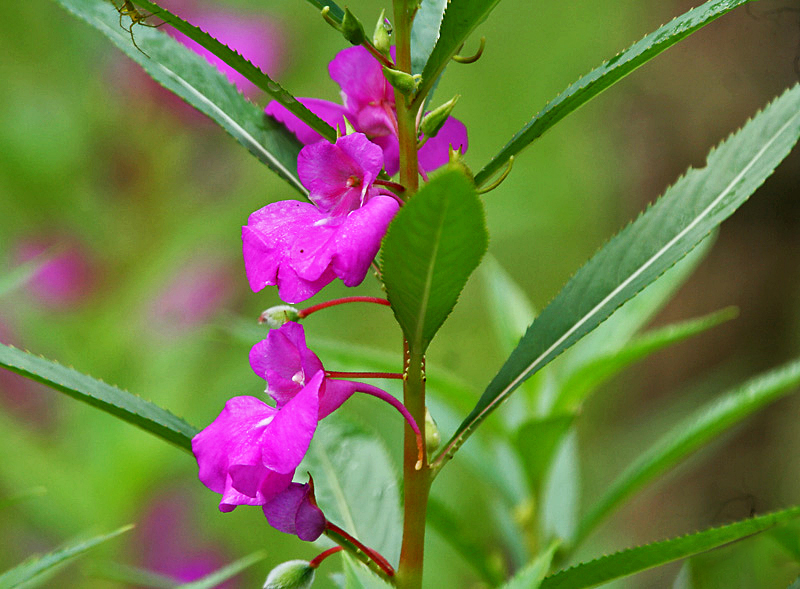
Impatiens balsamina of Balsaminaceae family

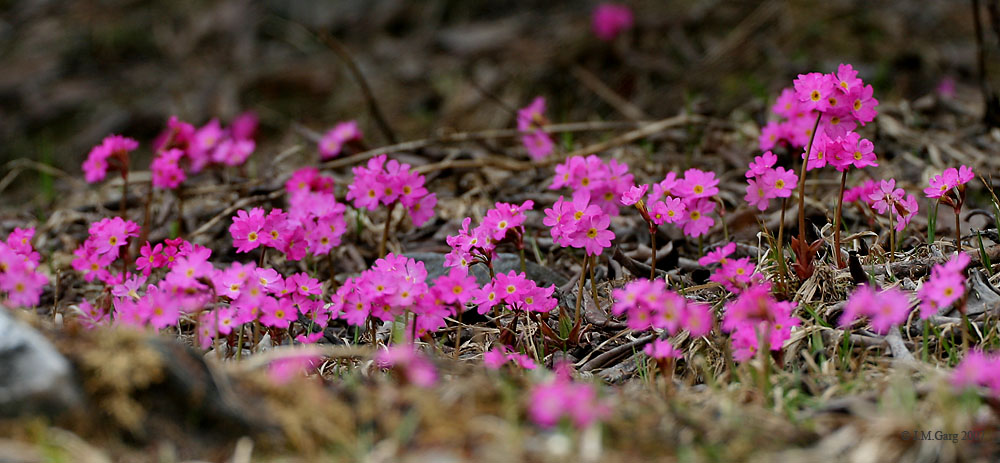
Primula rosea of Primulaceae family

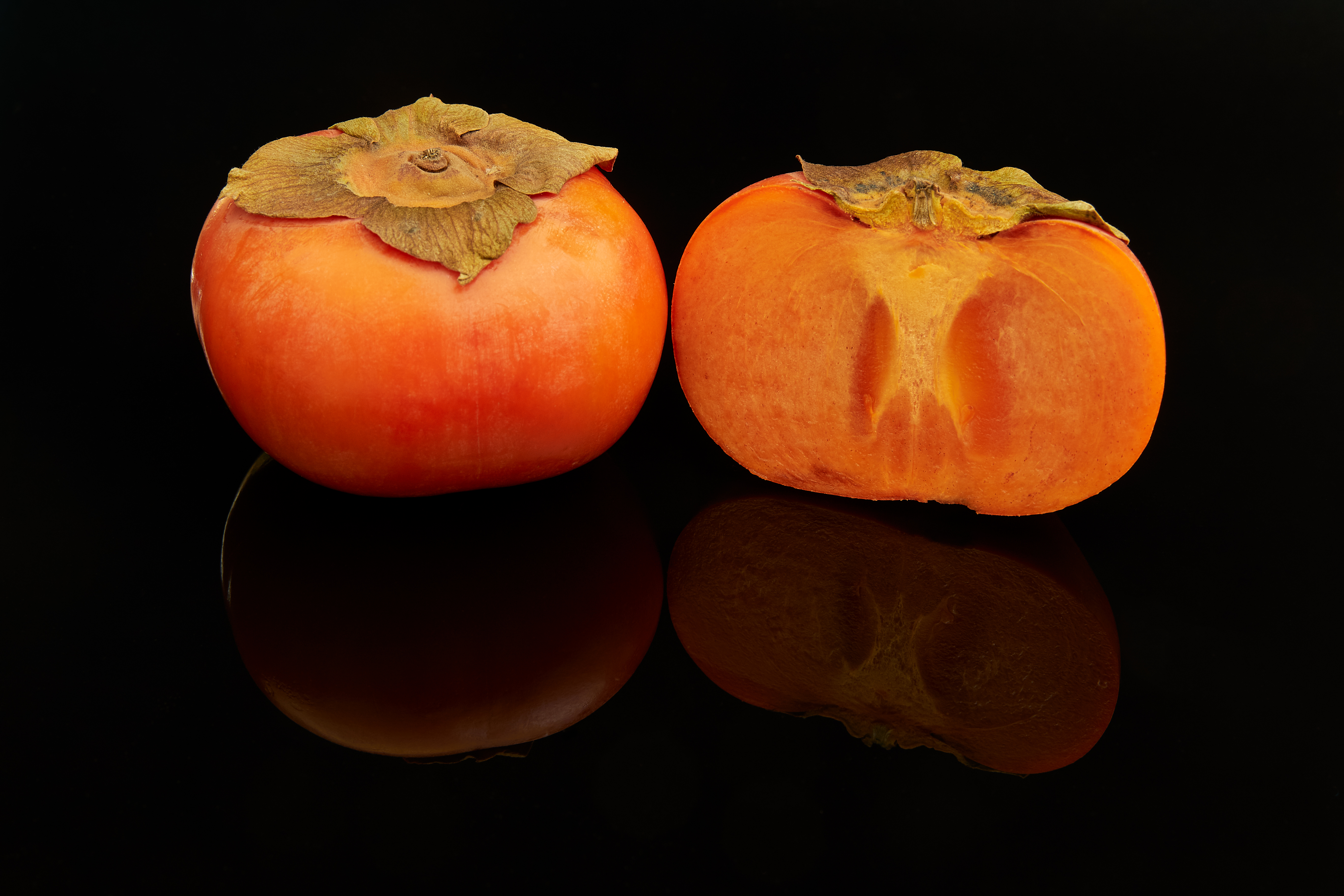
Diospyros kaki or oriental persimmon of Diospyros genus and Ebenaceae family

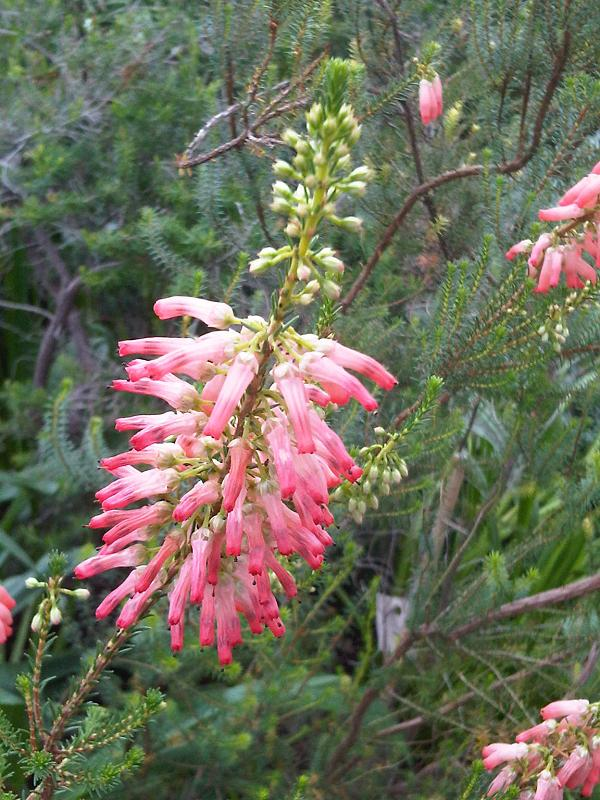
Erica afra inflorescence

Pieris japonica inflorescence

Stewartia pseudocamellia

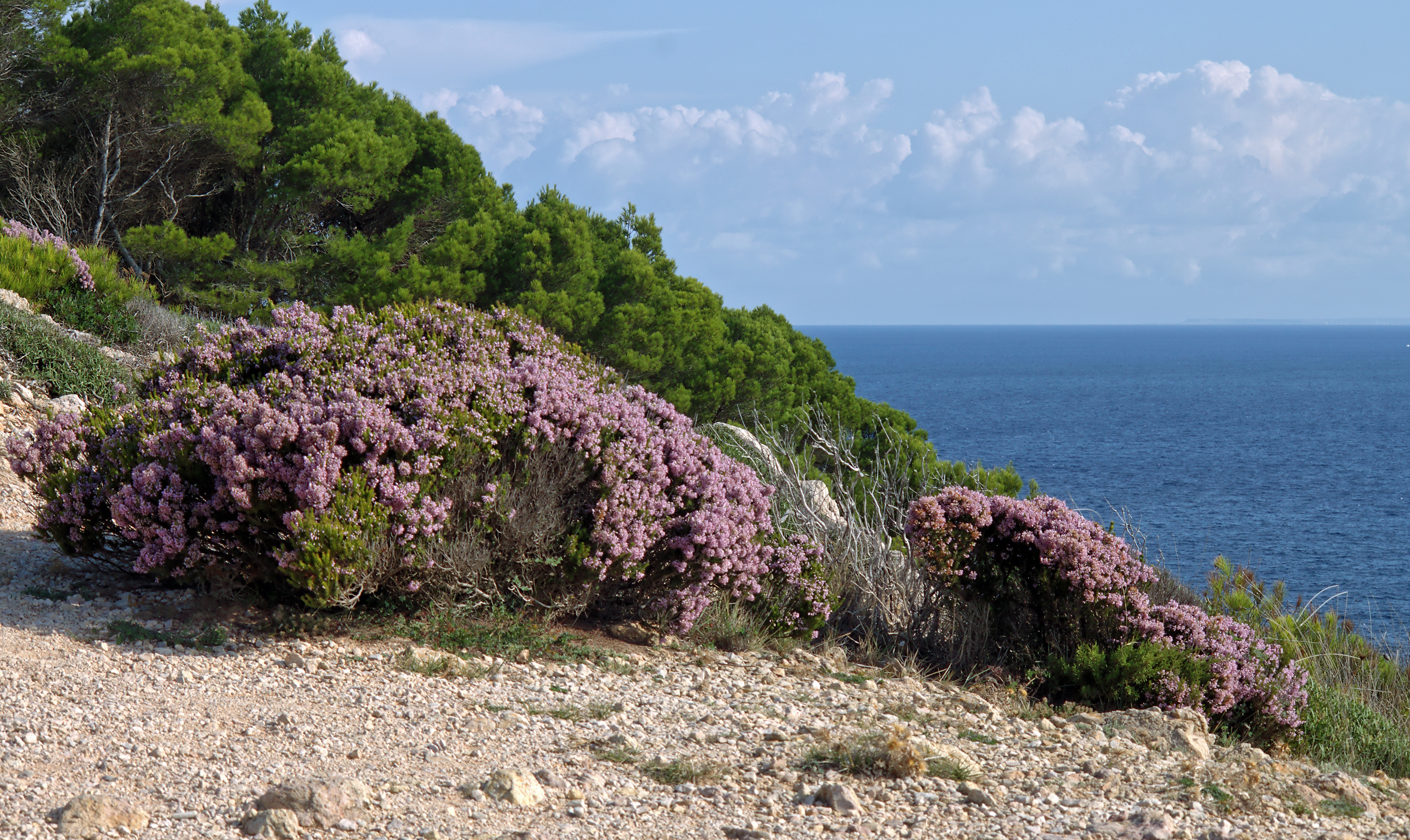
Erica multiflora

Sarracenia flava

== Distribution ==
Sarracenia purpurea, a carnivorous species in the order Ericales

Ericales are a cosmopolitan order. Areas of distribution of families vary largely – while some are restricted to tropics, others exist mainly in Arctic or temperate regions. The entire order contains over 8,000 species, of which the Ericaceae account for 2,000–4,000 species (by various estimates).

== Evolution and taxonomy ==
According to molecular studies, the lineage that led to Ericales diverged from other plants about 127 million years or diversified 110 million years ago, but remains uncertain.

22 families are recognized as members of the Ericales in the APG IV system of classification:

- Family Actinidiaceae (kiwifruit family)
- Family Balsaminaceae (balsam family)
- Family Clethraceae (clethra family)
- Family Cyrillaceae (cyrilla family)
- Family Diapensiaceae
- Family Ebenaceae (ebony and persimmon family)
- Family Ericaceae (heath, rhododendron, and blueberry family)
- Family Fouquieriaceae (ocotillo family)
- Family Lecythidaceae (Brazil nut family)
- Family Marcgraviaceae
- Family Mitrastemonaceae
- Family Pentaphylacaceae
- Family Polemoniaceae (phlox family)
- Family Primulaceae (primrose and snowbell family)
- Family Roridulaceae
- Family Sapotaceae (sapodilla family)
- Family Sarraceniaceae (American pitcher plant family)
- Family Sladeniaceae
- Family Styracaceae (silverbell family)
- Family Symplocaceae (sapphireberry family)
- Family Tetrameristaceae
- Family Theaceae (tea and camellia family)

Likely phylogenetic relationships between the families of the Ericales:

- Ericales
  - - - - - - - - ericoids
                  - - Cyrillaceae
                    - Ericaceae
                  - Clethraceae
                - sarracenioids
                  - - Roridulaceae
                    - Actinidiaceae
                  - Sarraceniaceae
              - - styracoids
                  - - Styracaceae
                    - Diapensiaceae
                  - Symplocaceae
            - Theaceae
          - Pentaphylacaceae
        - - primuloids
            - - Primulaceae
              - Ebenaceae
            - Sapotaceae
      - - polemonioids
          - Polemoniaceae
          - Fouquieriaceae
    - - Lecythidaceae
      - Mitrastemonaceae
  - - balsaminoids
      - - Marcgraviaceae
        - Tetrameristaceae
      - Balsaminaceae

=== Previously included families ===
These families are not recognized in the APG III system but have been in common use in the recent past:

- Family Myrsinaceae (cyclamen and scarlet pimpernel family) → Primulaceae
- Family Pellicieraceae → Tetrameristaceae
- Family Maesaceae → Primulaceae
- Family Ternstroemiaceae → Pentaphylacaceae
- Family Theophrastaceae → Primulaceae

These make up an early diverging group of asterids. Under the Cronquist system, the Ericales included a smaller group of plants, which were placed among the Dilleniidae:

- Family Ericaceae
- Family Cyrillaceae
- Family Clethraceae
- Family Grubbiaceae
- Family Empetraceae
- Family Epacridaceae
- Family Pyrolaceae
- Family Monotropaceae

== Relationship to humans ==
=== Economic importance ===
The most commercially used plant in the order is tea (Camellia sinensis) from the family Theaceae. The order also includes some edible fruits, including kiwifruit (esp. Actinidia chinensis var. deliciosa), persimmon (genus Diospyros), blueberry, huckleberry, cranberry, Brazil nut, and Mamey sapote. The order also includes shea (Vitellaria paradoxa), which is the major dietary lipid source for millions of sub-Saharan Africans. Many Ericales species are cultivated for their showy flowers: well-known examples are azalea, Rhododendron, Camellia, heather, Primula, Cyclamen, Phlox, and busy Lizzie.

== See also ==
- Paradinandra, a fossil genus with uncertain placement within the order Ericales

== Bibliography ==
- du Mortier, B.C.J. (1829). Analyse des Familles de Plantes : avec l'indication des principaux genres qui s'y rattachent. Vol. 28. Tournay: Imprimerie de J. Casterman.
- Jansen, S.; Watanabe, T.; Caris, P.; Geuten, K.; Lens, F.; Pyck, N.; Smets, E. (2004). "The Distribution and Phylogeny of Aluminium Accumulating Plants in the Ericales". Plant Biology. 6 (4): 498–505. Bibcode:2004PlBio...6..498J. doi:10.1055/s-2004-820980. PMID 15248133. S2CID 260248095.
- Judd, W.S.; Campbell, C.S.; Kellogg, E.A.; Stevens, P.F.; Donoghue, M.J. (2002). "Ericales". Plant Systematics: A Phylogenetic Approach (2nd ed.). Sinauer Associates. pp. 425–436. ISBN 978-0-87893-403-4.
- Smets, E.; Pyck, N. (February 2003). "Ericales (Rhododendron)". Nature Encyclopedia of Life Sciences. Nature Publishing Group. Archived from the original on 13 May 2011.
- Arne A. Anderberg; Bertil Stahl; Mari Kallersjo (May 2000). "Maesaceae, a New Primuloid Family in the Order Ericales s.l.". Taxon. 49 (2): 183–187. Bibcode:2000Taxon..49..183A. doi:10.2307/1223834. JSTOR 1223834.
- Schönenberger, Jürg; Anderberg, Arne A.; Sytsma, Kenneth J. (1 March 2005). "Molecular Phylogenetics and Patterns of Floral Evolution in the Ericales". International Journal of Plant Sciences. 166 (2): 265–288. Bibcode:2005IJPlS.166..265S. doi:10.1086/427198. JSTOR 10.1086/427198. S2CID 35461118.
