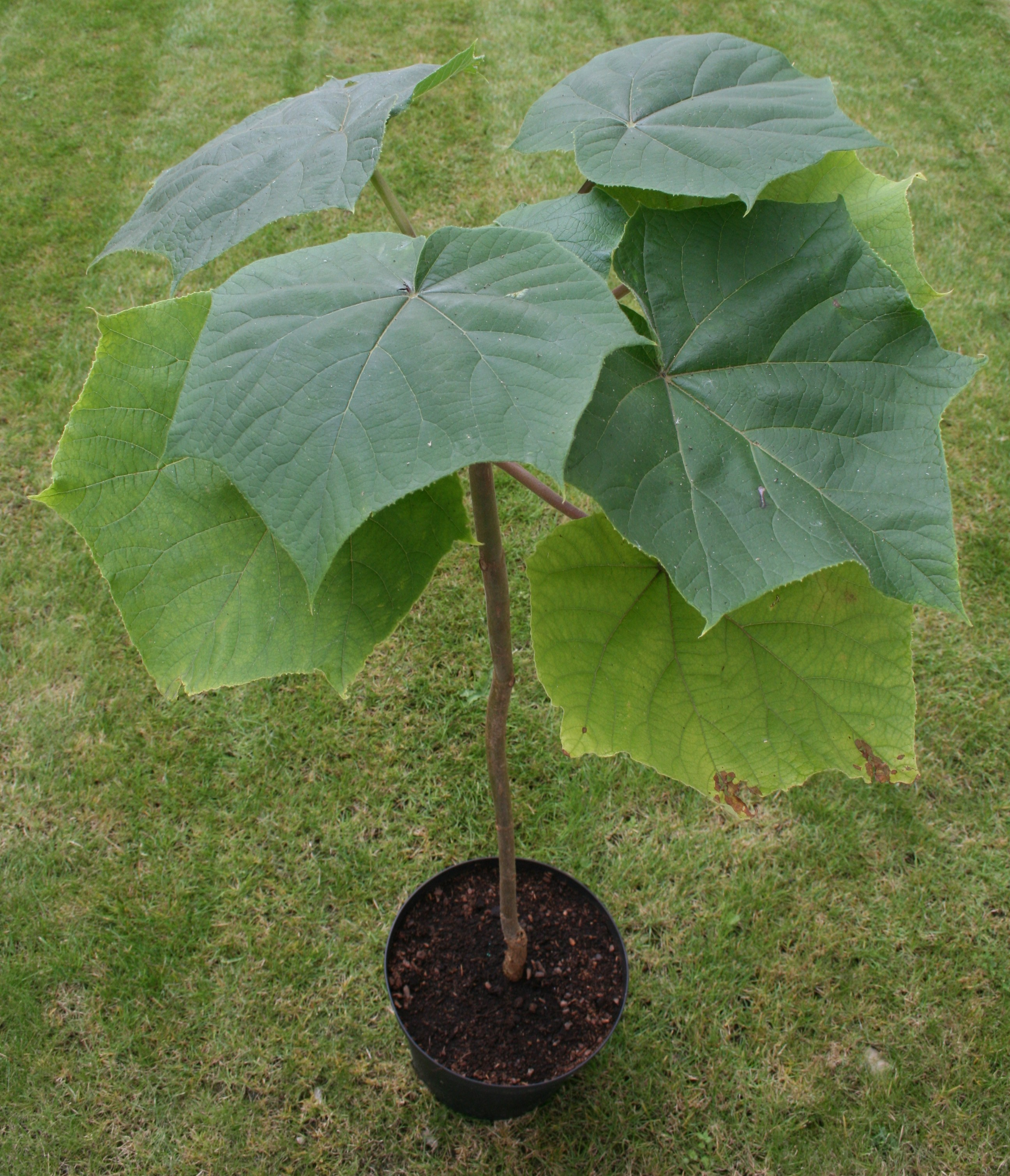

Scientific classification
- Kingdom: Plantae
- Clade: Tracheophytes
- Clade: Angiosperms
- Clade: Eudicots
- Clade: Asterids
- Order: Lamiales
- Family: Paulowniaceae
- Genus: Paulownia
- Species: P. elongata

Binomial name
- Paulownia elongata S.Y.Hu

= Paulownia elongata =

Species of tree

Paulownia elongata is a species of tree in the family Paulowniaceae, native to Asia.

The plant's leaves are very large and pubescent ('fuzzy—hairy'). This species can withstand a very wide range of environmental conditions. It does not grow at higher altitudes however.

== Uses ==
=== Cultivation ===
Paulownia elongata is cultivated as an ornamental tree for use in gardens and parks. It is selected for its purple flowers, and its shade tolerance.

=== Biofuel ===
The tree is planted and grown as feedstock for biofuel production. Due to the large quantity of biomass produced annually, it is suited for use as biofuel feedstock.

=== Lumber ===
Paulownia elongata is planted as a forestry tree producing strong, yet light, wood. It is grown for lumber in North America and China.

Commercial plantations are normally established from selected clones resulting from micropropagation.

They are known to grow up to 15 feet (4.6 m) or more in the first year. It is reportedly the fastest-growing hardwood tree. Some proponents state that P. elongata plantations can reach a harvestable size in five to seven years..
