= Paulownia catalpifolia =

Scientific classification
- Kingdom: Plantae
- Clade: Tracheophytes
- Clade: Angiosperms
- Clade: Eudicots
- Clade: Asterids
- Order: Lamiales
- Family: Paulowniaceae
- Genus: Paulownia
- Species: P. catalpifolia

Binomial name
- Paulownia catalpifolia T.Gong ex D.Y.Hong

Species of flowering plant

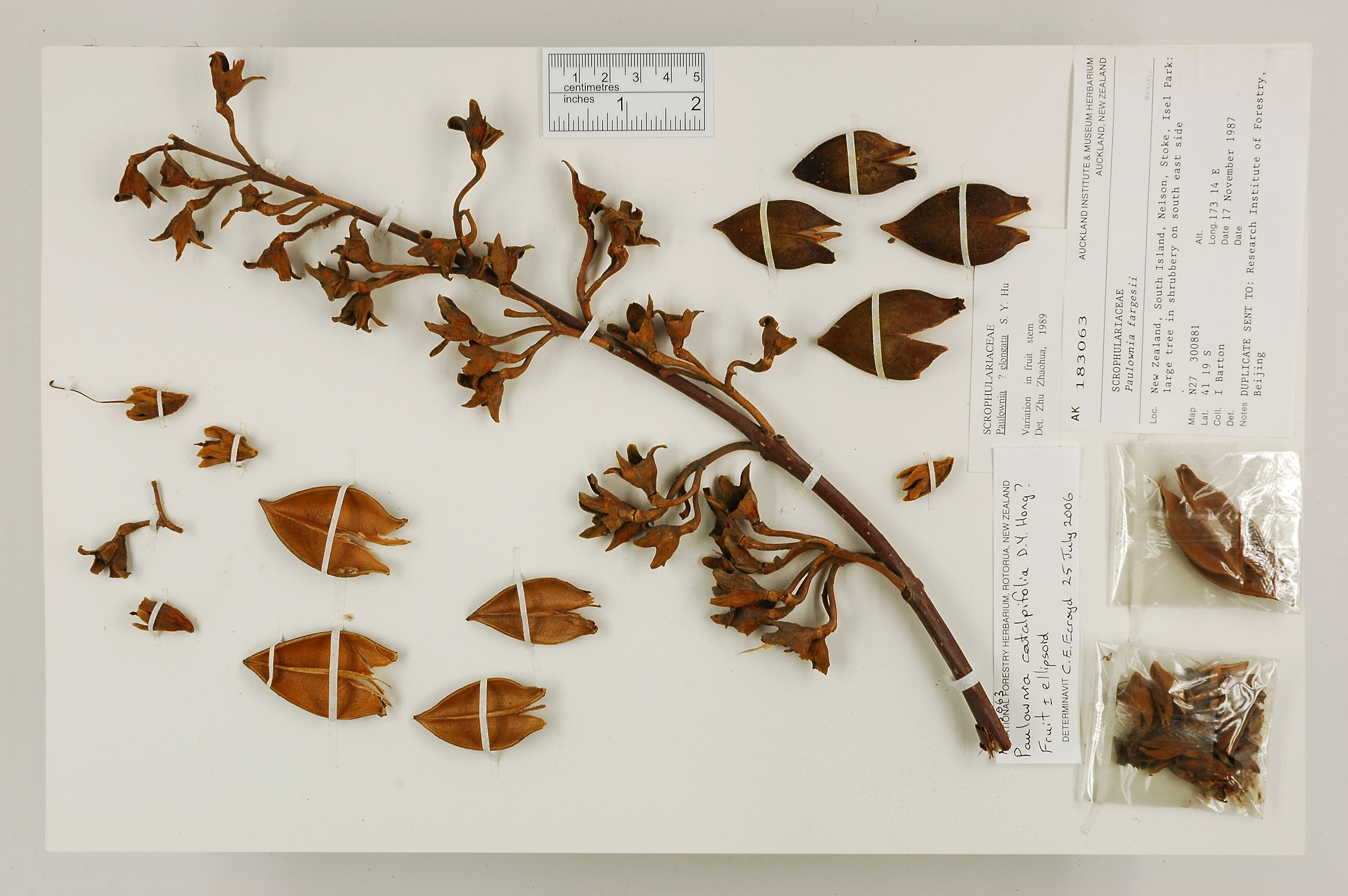

Paulownia catalpifolia is a species of flowering plant in the family Paulowniaceae, native to Shandong province, China, and introduced to Hungary. An extremely fast-growing tree, it is cultivated in China for its timber.
