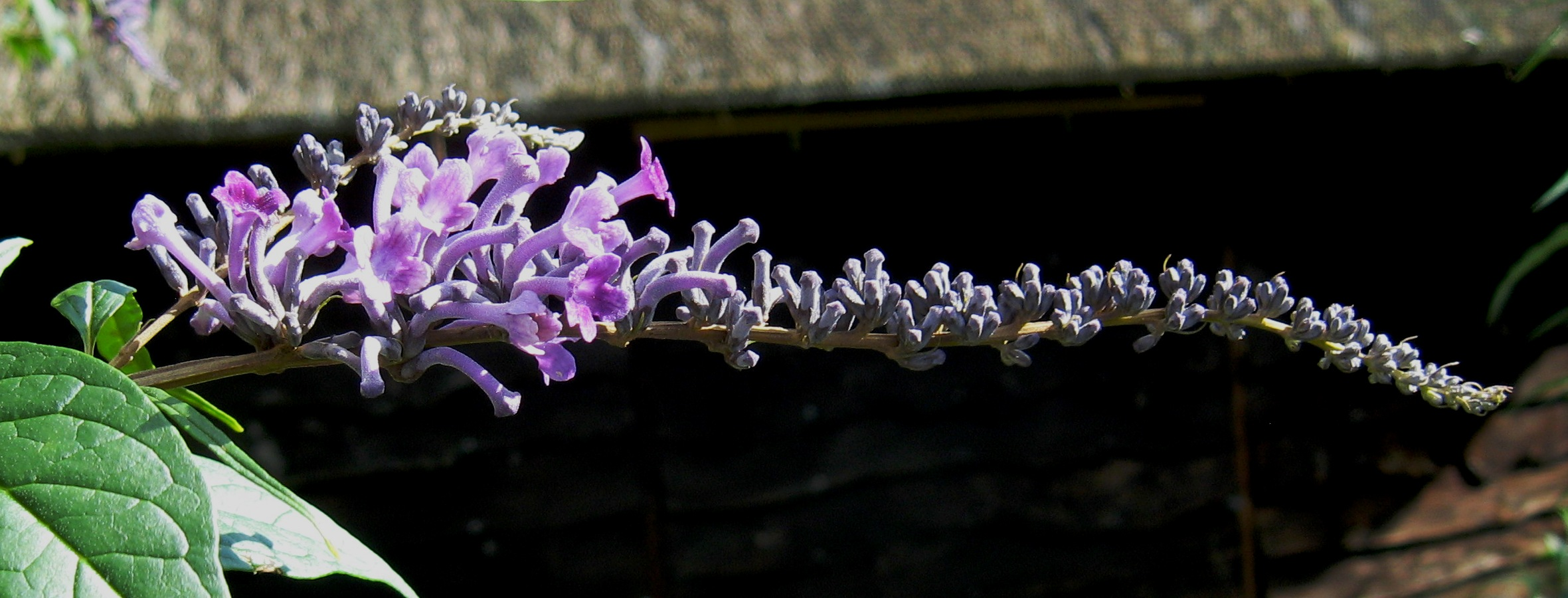
- Buddleja lindleyana flowers

Scientific classification
- Kingdom: Plantae
- Clade: Tracheophytes
- Clade: Angiosperms
- Clade: Eudicots
- Clade: Asterids
- Order: Lamiales
- Family: Scrophulariaceae
- Genus: Buddleja
- Species: B. lindleyana

Binomial name
- Buddleja lindleyana Fortune

= Buddleja lindleyana =

Species of plant

Buddleja lindleyana is a deciduous shrub native to the provinces of Anhui, Hunan, Hubei, Jiangsu, Shanghai, Sichuan, and Yunnan in China, where it grows in rocky scrub alongside streams and tracks at elevations of 200 – 2700 m. The shrub has also naturalized on Okinawa-jima, Japan, and in the south-eastern states of the United States.

Buddleja lindleyana was collected and introduced to western cultivation in 1843 by Robert Fortune, who named it for the botanist John Lindley.

== Description ==
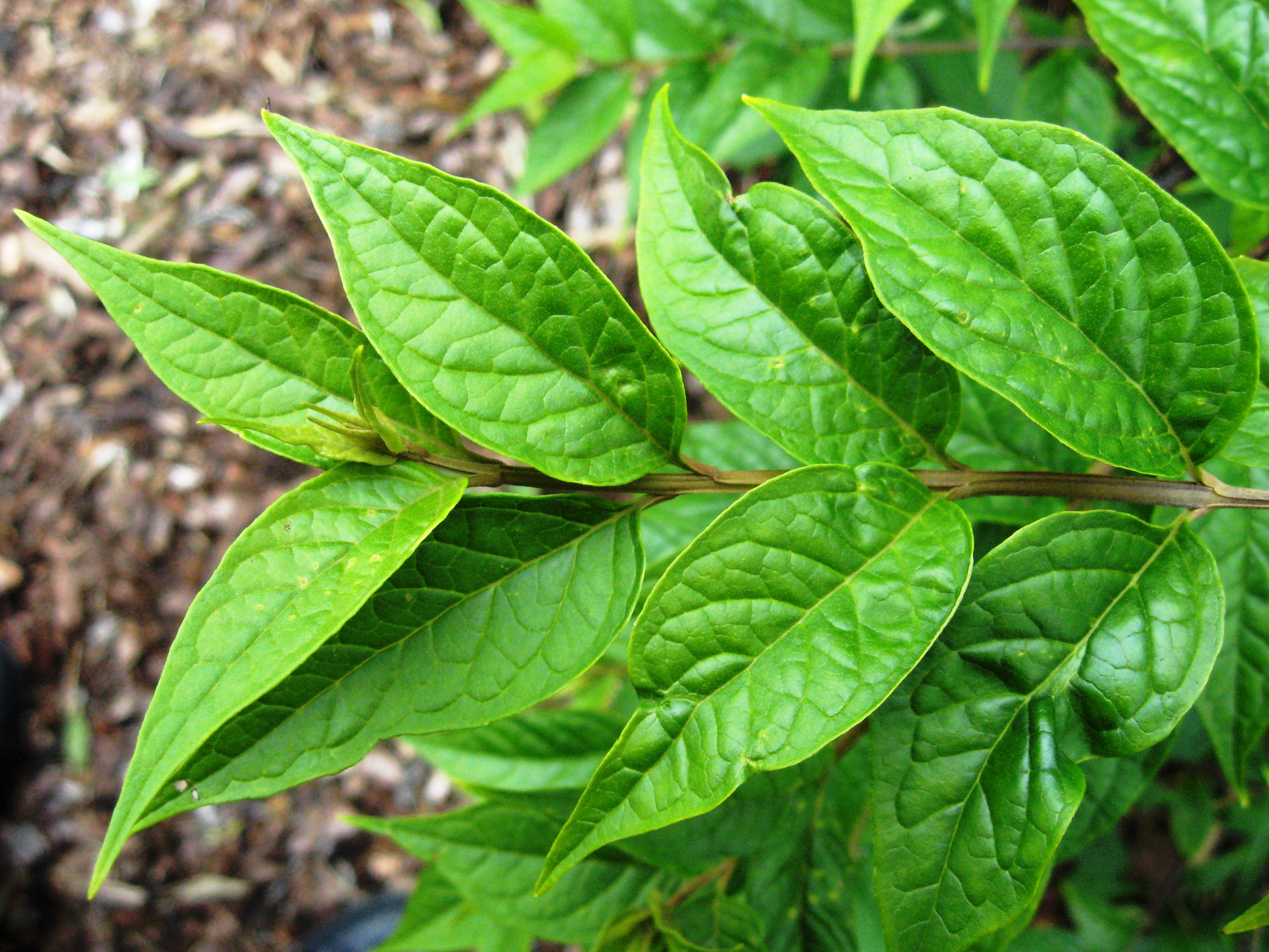
B. lindleyana foliage

Buddleja lindleyana grows to < 3 m in height in the wild, its slender branches tetragonous in section, and slightly winged. The dark green leaves are opposite, ovate, 4 – 20 cm in length. The individual purple flowers are arguably among the most attractive of the genus, but occur in such small numbers intermittently along slender, terminal one-sided panicles as to make little impact; they are also scentless. Flowering occurs in both June and July. Ploidy 2n = 38.

== Cultivation ==
The shrub is hardy down to −15 °C. but needs protection from winter winds and is best grown on a south wall. In the UK, specimens are grown as part of the NCCPG national collection at Longstock Park Nursery, near Stockbridge, and at the Sir Harold Hillier Gardens, also in Hampshire. Hardiness: USDA zone 8.
