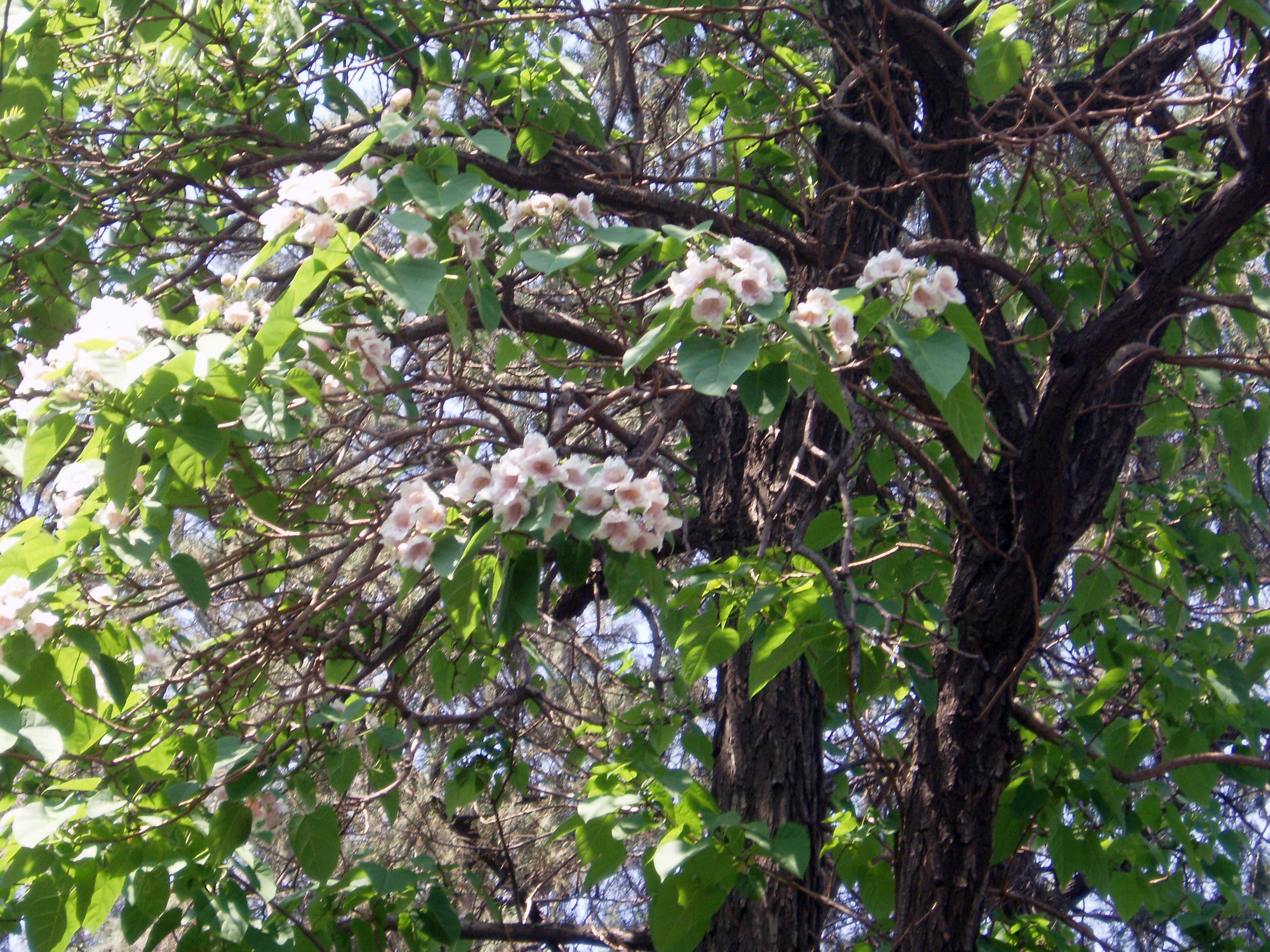
- Flowers and leaves

Scientific classification
- Kingdom: Plantae
- Clade: Tracheophytes
- Clade: Angiosperms
- Clade: Eudicots
- Clade: Asterids
- Order: Lamiales
- Family: Paulowniaceae
- Genus: Paulownia
- Species: P. fortunei

Binomial name
- Paulownia fortunei (Seem.) Hemsl.

Synonyms
- Campsis fortunei Seem.; Paulownia duclouxii Dode; Paulownia longifolia Hand.-Mazz.; Paulownia meridionalis Dode; Paulownia mikado T.Itô

= Paulownia fortunei =

Species of tree

Paulownia fortunei commonly called the dragontree, dragon tree or Fortune's empress tree, is a deciduous tree in the family Paulowniaceae, native to southeastern China (including Taiwan), Laos and Vietnam. It is an extremely fast-growing tree, and is planted for timber harvesting. It appears to be nowhere near as dangerously invasive as Paulownia tomentosa.

== Uses ==
Aside from its use as a cheap timber tree, it is being studied for use in phytoremediation and carbon sequestration. P. fortunei is cultivated as an ornamental tree in parks and gardens. Its cultivar Fast Blue='Minfast' has gained the Royal Horticultural Society's Award of Garden Merit.
