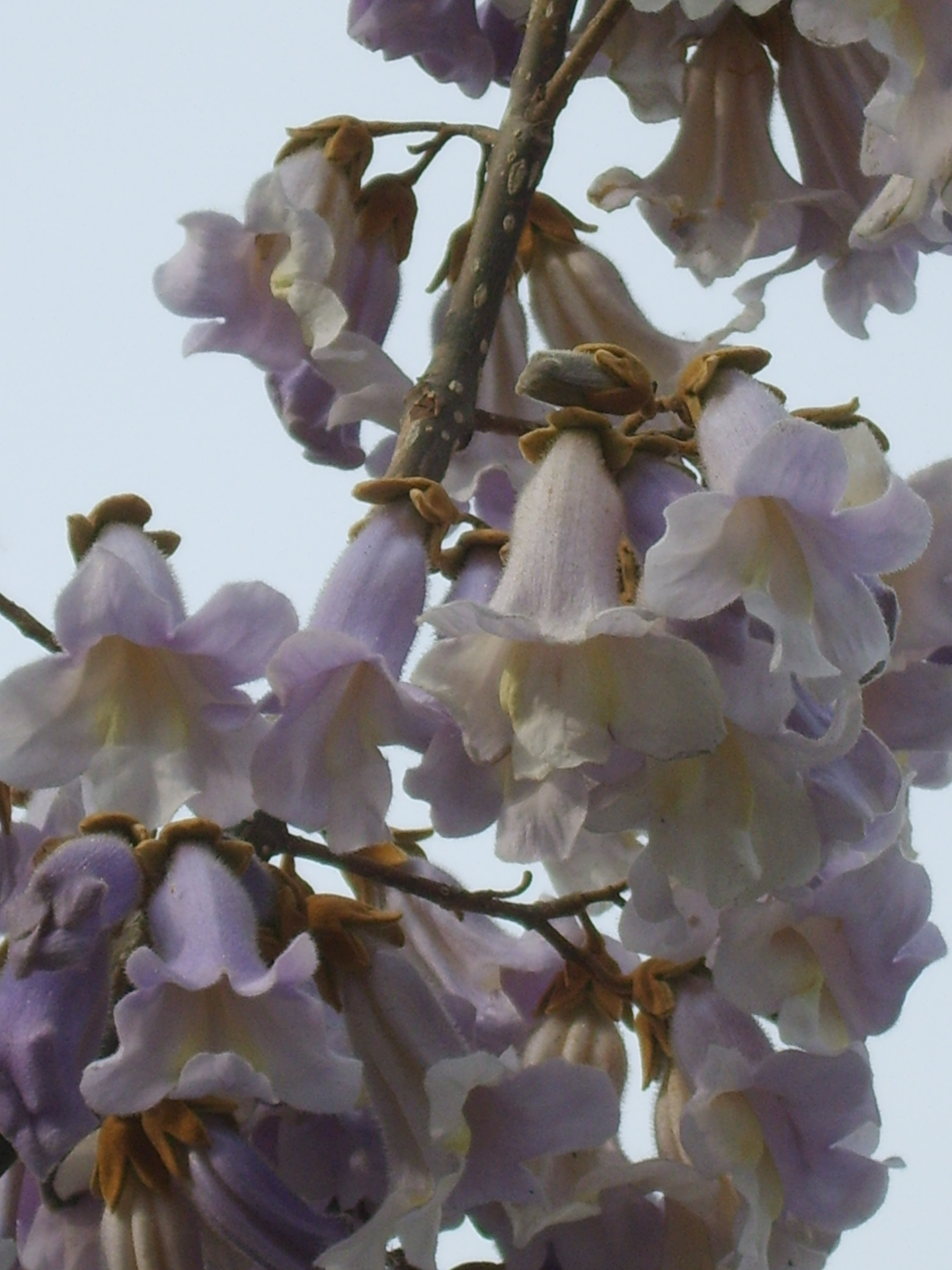

Scientific classification
- Kingdom: Plantae
- Clade: Tracheophytes
- Clade: Angiosperms
- Clade: Eudicots
- Clade: Asterids
- Order: Lamiales
- Family: Paulowniaceae
- Genus: Paulownia
- Species: P. coreana

Binomial name
- Paulownia coreana Uyeki, 1925

= Paulownia coreana =

Species of tree

Paulownia coreana, also called Paulownia glabrata or Korean paulownia, is an indigenous species of South Korea. It is cultivated in South Pyongan and south of Gyeonggi.

== Description ==
Korean paulownia is a tall and broadleaf deciduous tree, growing to a height of 15–20 m (50–65 ft) with a diameter of 75 cm (30 in).

=== Foliage ===
The leaves are 150–230 mm (6–9 in) in length, and 125–280 mm (5–11 in) in width. The other characteristics of the leaves are that they have opposite leaf arrangement and netted venation. The leafstalk is 100–200 mm (4–8 in) long, and it has puffs on it.

=== Flower and fruit ===
The light purple flowers bloom from May to June; while the flower of Paulownia tomentosa has purple stripes, that of Paulownia coreana does not. The flower has five divided petals, each 5–7.5 cm (2–3 in) in length. The tree bears light brown fruit from October to November; the fruits are elliptical, with sticky puffs.

== Uses ==
Since Korean paulownia is light, and easy to handle, it is considered good lumber. It can be used for making furniture, athletic goods and musical instruments. Specifically, the timber delivers sound well, so it is used to make the geomungo (Korean musical instrument with six strings) and the gayageum (twelve-string Korean zither). It also grows rapidly, so when cultivated, it helps prevent disease in plants. Its leaves are used as an insecticide, and its bark is used as natural dye. In addition, Paulownia coreana’s bark plays a great role in oriental medicine.
