= Wightia =

Wightia is the scientific name of two genera of organisms and may refer to:

- Wightia (plant), a genus of plants in the order Lamiales
- Wightia (pterosaur), a genus of pterosaurs in the family Tapejaridae

== See also ==
- Whiteia, a genus of coelacanth fish
