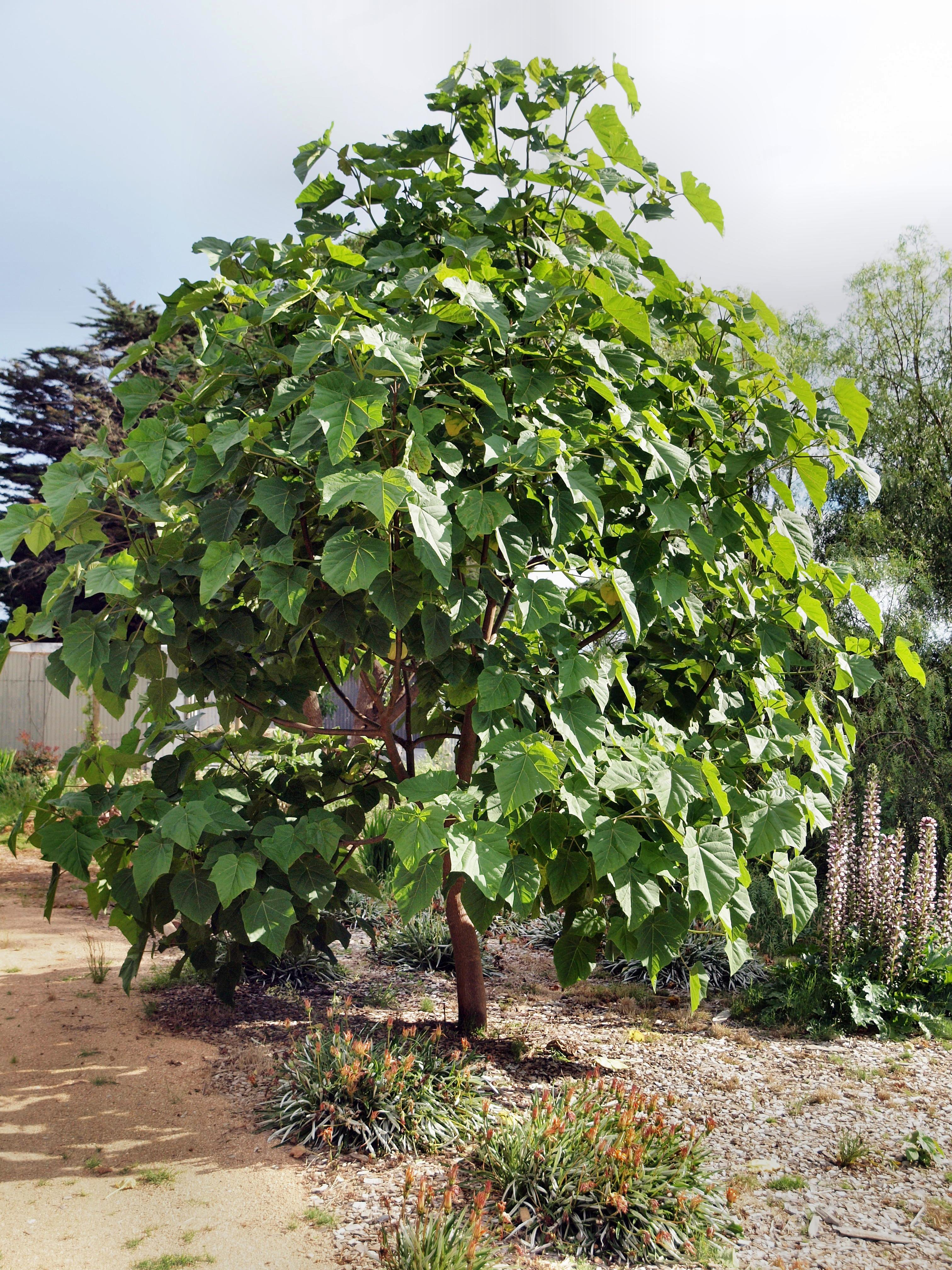

Conservation status
- Critically Endangered (IUCN 2.3)

Scientific classification
- Kingdom: Plantae
- Clade: Tracheophytes
- Clade: Angiosperms
- Clade: Eudicots
- Clade: Asterids
- Order: Lamiales
- Family: Paulowniaceae
- Genus: Paulownia
- Species: P. kawakamii

Binomial name
- Paulownia kawakamii T.Itô

Synonyms
- Paulownia rehderiana Hand.-Mazz.; Paulownia thyrsoidea Rehder; Paulownia viscosa Hand.-Mazz.

= Paulownia kawakamii =

Species of tree

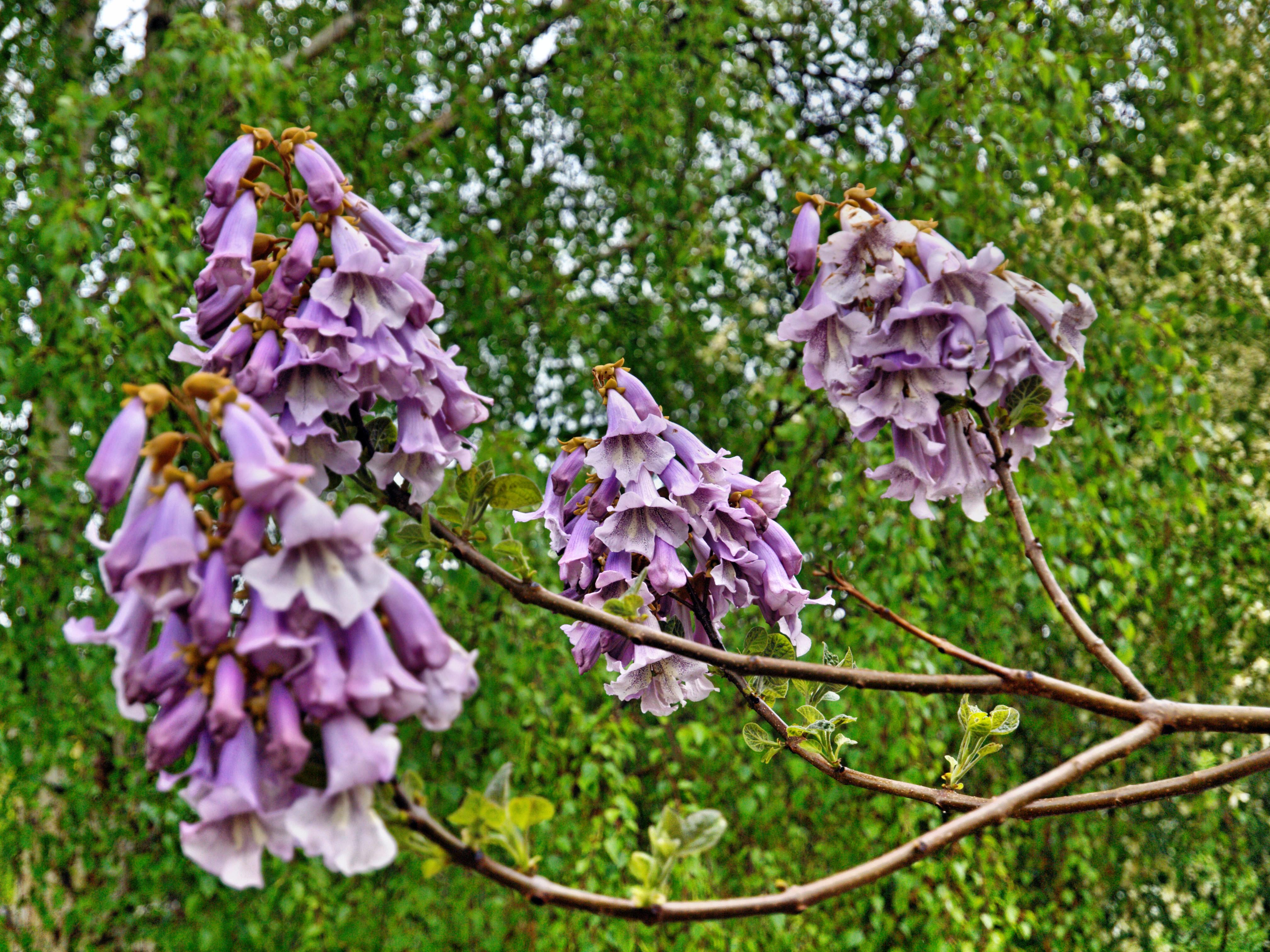

Paulownia kawakamii, commonly known as the sapphire dragon tree, is a tree species in the family Paulowniaceae. The tree is native to Taiwan and southern China. It is deciduous and bears many large violet flowers in early spring before the leaves appear.

Paulownia kawakamii is an IUCN Red List critically endangered plant species, that is threatened by habitat destruction in its native range.

The species was first described by Tokutarô Itô in 1912.

== Cultivation ==
Paulownia kawakamii is cultivated by plant nurseries, for use as an ornamental tree. In Southern California it is reported to be deep-rooted, and generally does not lift adjacent pavement.
