= Wightia (plant) =

Scientific classification
- Kingdom: Plantae
- Clade: Tracheophytes
- Clade: Angiosperms
- Clade: Eudicots
- Clade: Asterids
- Order: Lamiales
- Family: Paulowniaceae
- Genus: Wightia; Wall.

Species
- Wightia borneensis Hook.f.; Wightia speciosissima (D.Don) Merr.

Genus of flowering plants

Wightia is a genus of flowering plants tentatively sister to the Phrymaceae which currently contains only two species. It grows as a tree, or a hemiepiphytic pseudo-vine, up to 15 metres (49 ft) tall. It is found in South Asia and South East Asia, from Nepal and India to Thailand, Vietnam and China's Yunnan Province, at altitudes below 2,500 m (8,200 ft). There are still morphological characters as well as nuclear genome data to support Wightia as sister to Paulownia leading it to be of proposed hybrid origin from Phrymaceae and Paulowniaceae. Due to chloroplast and mitochondrial data showing Wightia as sister to Phrymaceae it is proposed that a new family Wightiaceae be recognized.
