= Shiuyinghua =

Scientific classification
- Kingdom: Plantae
- Clade: Tracheophytes
- Clade: Angiosperms
- Clade: Eudicots
- Clade: Asterids
- Order: Lamiales
- Family: Paulowniaceae
- Genus: Shiuyinghua; Paclt
- Species: S. silvestrii

Binomial name
- Shiuyinghua silvestrii (Pamp. & Bonati) Paclt

Species of flowering plant

Shiuyinghua is a monotypic genus of flowering plants belonging to the family Paulowniaceae. The only species is Shiuyinghua silvestrii.

It is native to the province of Hubei in southern central China.

The genus name of Shiuyinghua is in honour of Shiu-Ying Hu (1910–2012), a Chinese botanist. She was an expert in the plant genera of Ilex (Aquifoliaceae), Hemerocallis (Amaryllidaceae), and Panax (Araliaceae). The Latin specific epithet of silvestrii means woodland, from silva. Both the genus and the species were first described and published in J. Arnold Arbor. Vol.43 on page 217 in 1962.
