= Shiu-Ying Hu =

Chinese botanist (1910–2012)

Shiu-Ying Hu BBS
- Born: 22 February 1910; Xuzhou, Jiangsu, Qing China
- Died: 22 May 2012 (aged 102); Sha Tin, Hong Kong
- Education: Ginling College (BS); Lingnan University, Guangzhou (MS); Radcliffe College, Harvard (PhD)
- Known for: Botany
- Scientific career
- Workplaces: West China Union University; Harvard University; Chung Chi College, CUHK
- Doctoral advisor: Elmer Drew Merrill

Shiu-Ying Hu, BBS (Chinese: 胡秀英; 22 February 1910 – 22 May 2012), or Hu Xiuying, was a Chinese botanist. She was an expert in the plant genera of Ilex (Aquifoliaceae), Hemerocallis (Amaryllidaceae), and Panax (Araliaceae). She studied the families Orchidaceae, Compositae, and Malvaceae, and Chinese medicinal herbs and food plants. She was given the nickname "Holly Hu" by her colleagues for her extensive work with holly plants.

== Life ==
Hu was born in 1910 to a farm family in a Chinese village near the city of Xuzhou in Jiangsu province. She received her B.Sc. in biology from Ginling College (now part of Nanjing Normal University) and M.Sc. in biology from Lingnan University (now part of Sun Yat-sen University). In 1946 Hu traveled to the United States to pursue a Ph.D. in botany at Radcliffe College. Her supervisor was Elmer Drew Merrill. In 1949 she became the second Chinese woman to receive a doctoral degree in botany from Harvard University, the first being Luetta Hsiu-Ying Chen (陳秀英, 1910–1949), who received her Ph.D. degree in 1942.

After earning her Ph.D., Hu worked as a research botanist at the Arnold Arboretum. In 1968 she took the post of Senior Lecturer in the Department of Biology at CUHK, which Hu held until her retirement in 1975. She continued to carry out research during her retirement both at the CUHK Herbarium and the Harvard University Herbaria. Over the course of her career she produced over 160 academic treatises, collected over 30,000 specimens, and published the 800-page encyclopedia Food Plants of China.

== Death ==
On 22 May 2012, Hu died at the age of 102 from kidney failure caused by pneumonia at the Prince of Wales Hospital in Sha Tin, Hong Kong.

== Tree Song ==
John Williams attributes his piece Tree Song for Violin and Orchestra in a large part to Hu. The first movement of the piece is entitled "Dr. Hu and the Meta-Sequoia". He described the following experience in his note for the premiere in 2000:

During our stroll we casually paused in front of a large tree that I hadn't looked at closely enough to recognize immediately. Pointing to the tree, Dr. Hu explained that this tree was the oldest metasequoia in North America and that she had planted it in the late 1940s using seeds she had brought with her from China. I was thunderstruck by this coincidence, and when I told her of “my” metasequoia in the Public Garden she informed me that the younger tree I loved so much was also one of her children.

== Awards and recognition ==
- 1962, botanist Paclt named in her honour, Shiuyinghua, which is a genus of flowering plants from Hubei belonging to the family Paulowniaceae.
- 1992: Shiu-Ying Hu Award
- 2001: Bronze Bauhinia Star
- 2002: Chinese University of Hong Kong Honorary Fellowship
- 2003: "Outstanding Chinese" in Success Stories produced by RTHK
- 2010: Named one of the top ten Loving Hearts of Hong Kong by ATV Home
