= Robert Fortune =

Scottish botanist, plant hunter and traveller

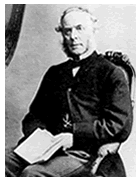
- Born: 16 September 1812; Edrom, Berwickshire, Scotland
- Died: 13 April 1880 (aged 67); London, England
- Known for: Introducing plants to Europe, Australia, and North America
- Scientific career
- Fields: Botanist, plant hunter
- Institutions: Royal Botanic Garden Edinburgh, Horticultural Society of London
- Author abbrev. (botany): Fortune

Robert Fortune (16 September 1812 – 13 April 1880) was a Scottish botanist, plant hunter, and traveller, best known for introducing around 250 new ornamental plants, mainly from China, but also Japan, into the gardens of Britain, Australia, and North America. He also played a role in the development of the tea industry in India in the 19th century.

== Life ==
Robert Fortune was born on 16 September 1812 in the small settlement or "fermtoun" of Kelloe in the parish of Edrom, Berwickshire, Scotland.

After completing his apprenticeship, he was employed at Moredun House, just south of Edinburgh, before then moving on to the Royal Botanic Garden Edinburgh. In 1840, he and his family moved to London to take up a position at the Horticultural Society of London's garden at Chiswick. Following the Treaty of Nanking in 1842, in early 1843, he was commissioned by the Horticultural Society to undertake a three-year plant collection expedition to southern China.

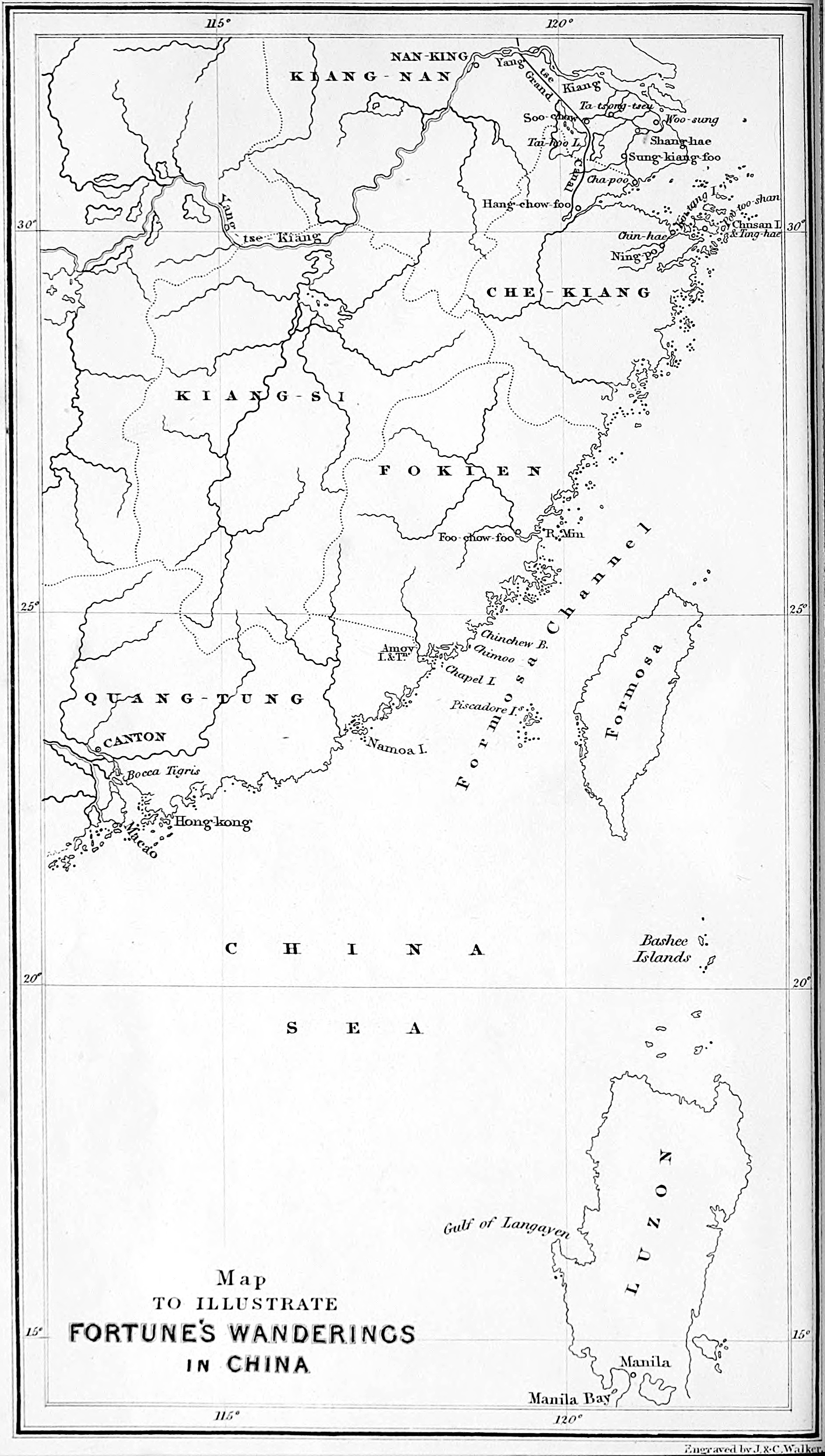
Map of Fortune's Wanderings in China

His travels resulted in the introduction to Europe, Australia, and North America of many flowers and plants. His most famous accomplishment was the successful introduction, although it was not the first by any means, of Chinese tea plants (Camellia sinensis), along with skilled tea makers, from China to India in 1848 on behalf of the British East India Company. Robert Fortune worked in China for several years in the period from 1843 to 1861.

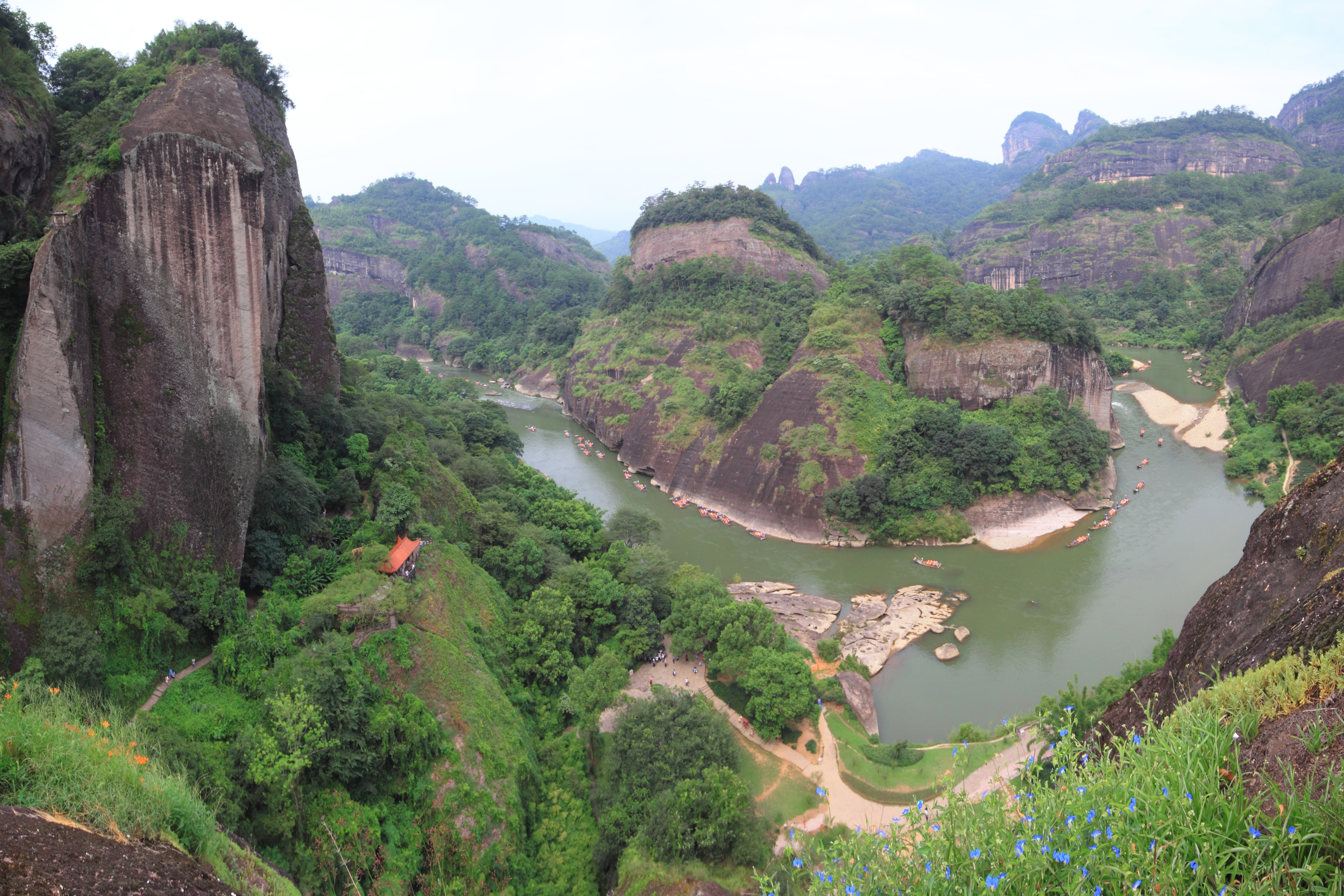
The remote Wuyi Mountains in Fujian Province, one of the important tea regions to which Fortune travelled.

Similar to other European travellers of the period, such as Walter Medhurst, Fortune disguised himself as a Chinese merchant during several, but not all, of his journeys beyond the newly established treaty port areas. Not only was Fortune's purchase of tea plants reportedly forbidden by the Chinese government of the time, but his travels were also beyond the allowable day's journey from the European treaty ports. Fortune travelled to some areas of China that had seldom been visited by Europeans, including remote areas of Fujian, Guangdong, and Jiangsu provinces.

Fortune employed many means to obtain plants and seedlings from local tea growers, although this was some 150 years before international biodiversity laws recognised state ownership of such natural resources. He is also known for his use of Nathaniel Bagshaw Ward's portable Wardian cases to sustain the plants. It is also widely reported that he took skilled workers on contract to India who would facilitate the production of tea in the plantations of the East India Company. With the exception of a few plants that survived in established Indian gardens, most of the Chinese tea plants Fortune introduced in the northwestern provinces of India perished. The other reason for the failure in India was that the British preference and fashion was for a strong dark tea brew, which was best made from the local Assam subspecies (Camellia sinensis var. assamica) and not the selection that Fortune had made in China. The technology and knowledge that was brought over from China was, however, instrumental in the later flourishing of the Indian tea industry in Assam and Sri Lanka.

In subsequent journeys, he visited Formosa (Taiwan) and Japan, and described the culture of the silkworm and the manufacture of rice. He introduced many trees, shrubs, and flowers to the West, including the cumquat, a climbing double yellow rose ('Fortune's Double Yellow' (syn. Gold of Ophir) which proved a failure in England's climate), and many varieties of tree peonies, azaleas and chrysanthemums.

He imported Japanese chestnuts into the United States, which led to the introduction of chestnut blight to the country 24 years after his death.

A climbing white rose that he brought back from China in 1850, believed to be a natural cross between Rosa laevigata and R. banksiae, was dubbed R. fortuniana (syn. R. fortuneana) in his honour. This rose, too, proved a failure in England, preferring warmer climates. Today, both of these roses are still widely grown by antique rose fanciers in mild winter regions. Rosa fortuniana also serves as a valuable rootstock in Australia and the southern regions of the United States.

He related his travels in a series of books.

He died in London on 13 April 1880, and is buried in Brompton Cemetery.

== Legacy ==
Fortune is credited with the introduction of a large number of plants, shrubs, and trees to Europe from China. In 1913, botanists Rehder and E.H.Wilson named a plant genus from China, with one species, Fortunearia sinensis, in his honour.

=== Plants named after Robert Fortune ===
- Arundinaria fortunei
- Berberis fortunei
- Cephalotaxus fortunei
- Cyrtomium fortunei
- Euonymus fortunei
- Hosta fortunei
- Keteleeria fortunei
- Osmanthus × fortunei Carrière (O. fragrans × O. heterophyllus)
- Paulownia fortunei
- Pleioblastus fortunei
- Rhododendron fortunei
- Rosa fortuniana
- Saxifraga fortunei Hook.
- Trachycarpus fortunei (has synonym Chamaerops fortunei)

== In fiction ==
Robert Fortune features as a character in Sara Sheridan's novel The Secret Mandarin (2009).

== Publications ==
- Three Years' Wandering in the Northern Provinces of China, A Visit to the Tea, Silk, and Cotton Countries, with an account of the Agriculture and Horticulture of the Chinese, New Plants, etc. (1847, John Murray) Excerpt China Heritage Quarterly No. 29 (March 2012) ISSN 1833-8461 .
- A Journey To The Tea Countries Of China; Including Sung-Lo And The Bohea Hills; With A Short Notice Of The East India Company's Tea Plantations In The Himalaya Mountains. (1852, John Murray) Excerpt China Heritage Quarterly.
- Two visits to the tea countries of China and the British tea plantations in the Himalaya: with a narrative of adventures, and a full description of the culture of the tea plant, the agriculture, horticulture, and botany of China (1853, John Murray; LCCN 04-32957; National Library: CAT10983833)
- A Residence Among the Chinese; Inland, On the Coast and at Sea; being a Narrative of Scenes and Adventures During a Third Visit to China from 1853 to 1856, including Notices of Many Natural Productions and Works of Art, the Culture of Silk, &c. (1857, John Murray)
- Yedo and Peking; A Narrative of a Journey to the Capitals of Japan and China, with Notices of the Natural Productions, Agriculture, Horticulture and Trade of those Countries and Other Things Met with By the Way (1863, John Murray)

== References and further reading ==
- Mather, Jeffrey. (2010). "Botanising in a Sinocentric world: Robert Fortune's travels in China". Studies in Travel Writing, 14(3), 257–270. https://doi.org/10.1080/13645145.2010.500099
- Sarah Rose. For All the Tea in China: How England Stole the World's Favorite Drink and Changed History. Viking: 2010. ISBN 0670021520
- Watt, Alistair, Robert Fortune, A Plant Hunter in the Orient. Royal Botanic Gardens, Kew: 2017. ISBN 1842466194 (distributed by the University of Chicago Press)
