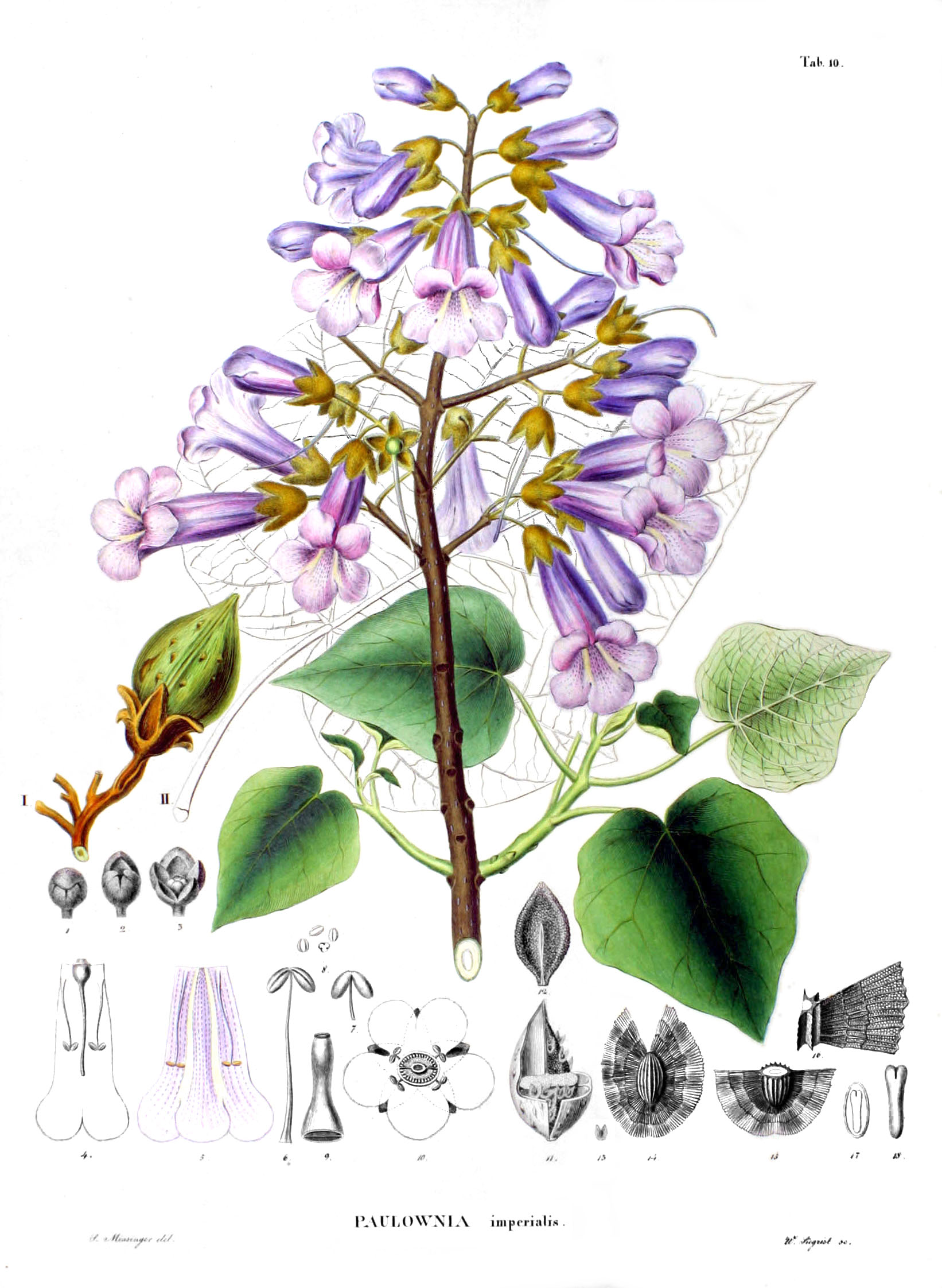
- Paulownia tomentosa

Scientific classification
- Kingdom: Plantae
- Clade: Tracheophytes
- Clade: Angiosperms
- Clade: Eudicots
- Clade: Asterids
- Order: Lamiales
- Family: Paulowniaceae
- Genus: Paulownia; Siebold & Zucc.

Species
- Six to 17 species, including: Paulownia catalpifolia Paulownia elongata Paulownia fargesii Paulownia fortunei Paulownia kawakamii Paulownia taiwaniana Paulownia tomentosa

= Paulownia =

Genus of flowering plants

Paulownia (/pɔːˈloʊniə/ paw-LOH-nee-ə) is a genus of seven to 17 species of hardwood trees (depending on taxonomic authority) in the family Paulowniaceae, the order Lamiales. The genus and family are native to east Asia and are widespread across China. The genus, originally Pavlovnia but now usually spelled Paulownia, was named in honour of Anna Pavlovna, queen consort of The Netherlands (1795–1865), daughter of Tsar Paul I of Russia. It is also called "princess tree" for the same reason.

It was originally sought after as an exotic ornamental tree in Europe and Asia, and later introduced to North America in 1844. Its fruits (botanically capsules) were also used as packaging material for goods shipped from East Asia to North America, leading to Paulownia groves where they were dumped near major ports. The tree has not persisted prominently in US gardens, in part due to its overwintering brown fruits that some consider ugly. In some areas it has escaped cultivation and is found in disturbed plots. Some US authorities consider the genus an invasive species, but in Europe, where it is also grown in gardens, it is not regarded as invasive.

Paulownia trees produce as many as 20 million tiny seeds per year. However, the seeds are very susceptible to soil biota and only colonize well on sterile soils (such as after a high temperature wildfire). Well-drained soil is also essential. Successful plantations usually purchase plants that have been professionally propagated from root cuttings or seedlings. Although seeds, seedlings, and roots of even mature trees are susceptible to rot, the wood is not and is used for boat building and surfboards.

Dimensionally stable and given its straight grain and light weight, Paulownia timber is extremely easy to work with and is reported to be resistant to decay, with good weathering characteristics.

Trees can grow to maturity in under 10 years and produce strong, lightweight timber, good as firewood, and with an even higher strength to weight ratio than balsa wood. Its density is low at around 0.28 kilograms per liter (2.8 lb/imp gal), although significantly higher than balsa's very low 0.16 kilograms per liter (1.6 lb/imp gal).

== Morphology ==
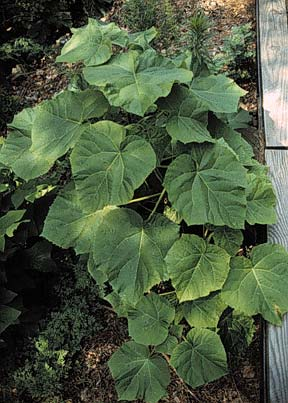
Paulownia tomentosa

Paulownia is a genus of angiosperm trees, and one of the fastest-growing trees in the world. Paulownia tomentosa can grow over 30 metres (98 ft) tall and has large heart shaped leaves ranging from 10–20 centimetres (4–8 in) wide and 15–30 centimetres (6–12 in) long with a 10–20 centimetres (4–8 in)-long petiole. The leaves grow in opposite decussate pairs, and as the name tomentosa suggests, are covered in hairs. The leaf margin can be toothed or entire and sometimes may be slightly lobed. They can be distinguished from common look-alike genera, such as Catalpa and Cercis, by secondary and tertiary venation. The leaves are late to come in on the tree and late to fall from the typically deciduous Paulownia. However, in tropical areas, the tree can be evergreen.

The leaves are often preceded by pale violet to purple-shaded tubular flowers, similar to a foxglove. Like most members of the Lamiales, the flowers are zygomorphic. The inflorescences are terminal erect 15–30 centimetres (6–12 in)-long panicles of ~5 centimetres (2 in) long flowers. The thick, fused calyx is covered by a brown hairy indumentum, and the fused calyx tube is the same length as its calyx lobes, except in P. catalpifolia and P. elongata, in which the lobes are shorter than the calyx tubes. The corolla has five fused lobes with a shorter adaxial bilobed lip, and a somewhat longer abaxial trilobed lower lip. The lips of all the petals are curled and their surface tomentose.

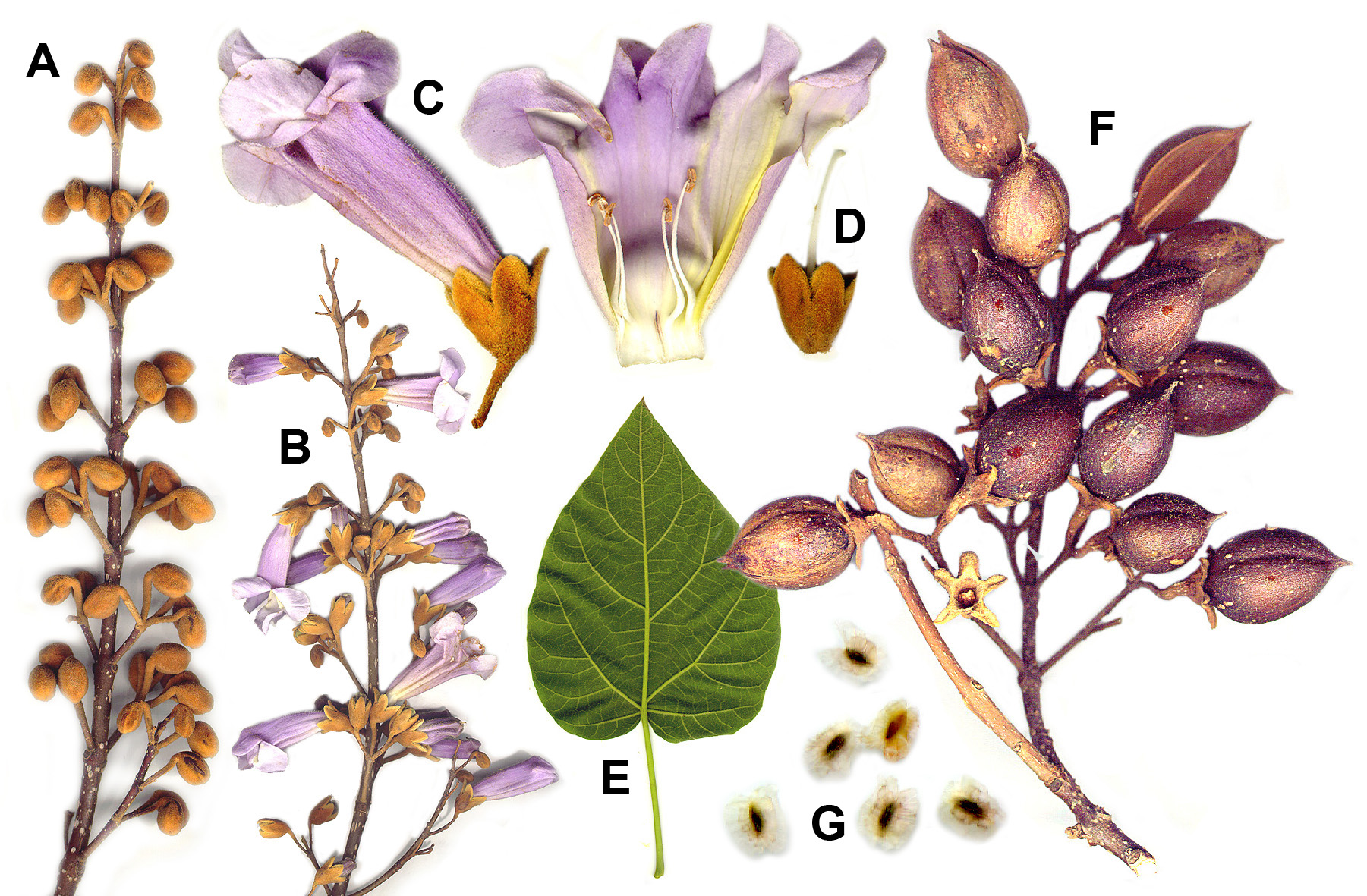
A: new buds; B: inflorescences; C: corolla tube; D: superior bilocular ovary; E: leaves; F: ovary capsules; G: seeds

On the inner side of the lower trilobed corolla tube run two light-yellow folded ridges from the calyx to the lip. They are interpreted as floral guides to the top of the corolla tube. Inside the corolla tube, and approximately halfway down, are four stamen filaments fused to the petals at the base, with two being longer than the others. At the bottom of the corolla tube is a short corolla-stamen tube. The base of the stamen filaments are bent so that they run along the upper portion of the flower with the arrow shaped anthers then depositing pollen on the dorsal side of a variety of pollen-feeding insects.

The superior bilocular ovary, surrounded by the brown calyx, with its stigma and style rising up, is approximately the same length as the longer stamen filaments that surround it. That is left on the stem as the corolla and stamen fall off. The stigma tip has a singular small hole that leads to a tubular dilated chamber at the top of the style, covered in receptive papillae. In the species P. kawakamii, the stigma tip is slightly bilobed, which is a unique morphological characteristic distinguishing Paulownia from all of the Lamiales. At the bottom of the ovary is a nectary, with nectary slits on the basal sides of the ovary, beneath a hairy region. The ovary then develops into a sticky green oval capsule tapered at the apex with the remaining dried up style sometimes still attached.

The capsule remains on the persistent brown calyx where it can last on the tree through the rest of the year before turning brown and woody, and loculicidal dehiscence reveals up to 2000 small winged seeds stacked tightly inside. The tiny seeds have lateral wings that gradually increase in length around the seed. The ventral and dorsal side of the seed are flat. The wing shape on the seeds is another characteristic distinguishing Paulownia from the rest of the Lamiales. The new buds, enclosed by the early brown fuzzy calyx, are visible in late summer to early fall and wait dormant, alongside the brown seed capsules, till spring.

== Fossil record ==
Paulownia once occurred in North America, with fossilized leaves being found in Tertiary strata of Ellensburg Canyon of Washington state.

Paulownia macrofossils have been recovered from the late Zanclean stage of the Pliocene sites in Pocapaglia, Italy and Paulownia caucasica macrofossils have been recovered from strata of the Serravallian stage of the Miocene in Georgia in the Caucasus region. It is believed that the climate then would have been suitable for the genus across the whole northern hemisphere.

== Uses ==
In China, Paulownia (Chinese: 桐; pinyin: tóng; Jyutping: tung4; Pe̍h-ōe-jī: tông or 泡桐 pāotóng) is popular for roadside planting and as an ornamental tree. Paulownia needs much light and does not like high water tables.

As a forestry crop, Paulownia are exacting in their requirements, performing well only in very well draining soil, with summer rainfall or availability of irrigation water. Paulownia is extremely fast growing, increasing in height by up to 6 metres (20 ft) in one year when young. Some species of plantation Paulownia can be harvested for sawn timber in as little as five years. Once the trees are harvested, they regenerate from their existing root systems, earning them the name of the "Phoenix tree" (that name is alternatively attributed to the belief that it is the only tree within which the phoenix will roost.)

Paulownia is also used in Chinese agroforestry systems because it grows quickly, its wood is light but strong, its flowers are rich in nectar, its leaves make good fodder for farm animals, it is deep-rooting, and it is late-leafing, and its canopy is sparse enough to allow crops below it get enough light to grow while being sheltered from the wind.

It is important in China, Korea, and Japan for making the soundboards of stringed musical instruments such as the guqin, guzheng (to a point of metonymy), pipa, koto, and gayageum. More recently it is used as body material for low-cost electric guitars, as the core for lightweight touring skis, and for surfboard cores. It is typically used in guitars as the core body, then laminated under a more durable wood.

=== Cultural significance ===
This Paulownia flower pattern (go-shichi-no-kiri) is the symbol of the Office of the Prime Minister of Japan. It also decorates the Order of the Rising Sun and the Order of the Paulownia Flowers and is a crest of the Eihei-ji Zen temple.

Across the Sinosphere, the endemic P. tomentosa is believed to be the perch of the phoenix; imperial garments in China and Japan are often adorned with both motifs combined with the bamboo, which seeds are said to be the bird's sustenance. It was notably the symbol of Toyotomi Hideyoshi and his clan. It is often a subject of classical Chinese poetry and extensively Japanese: the former especially in association with autumn, or mutual bonds (paulownias often believed to grow in pairs).

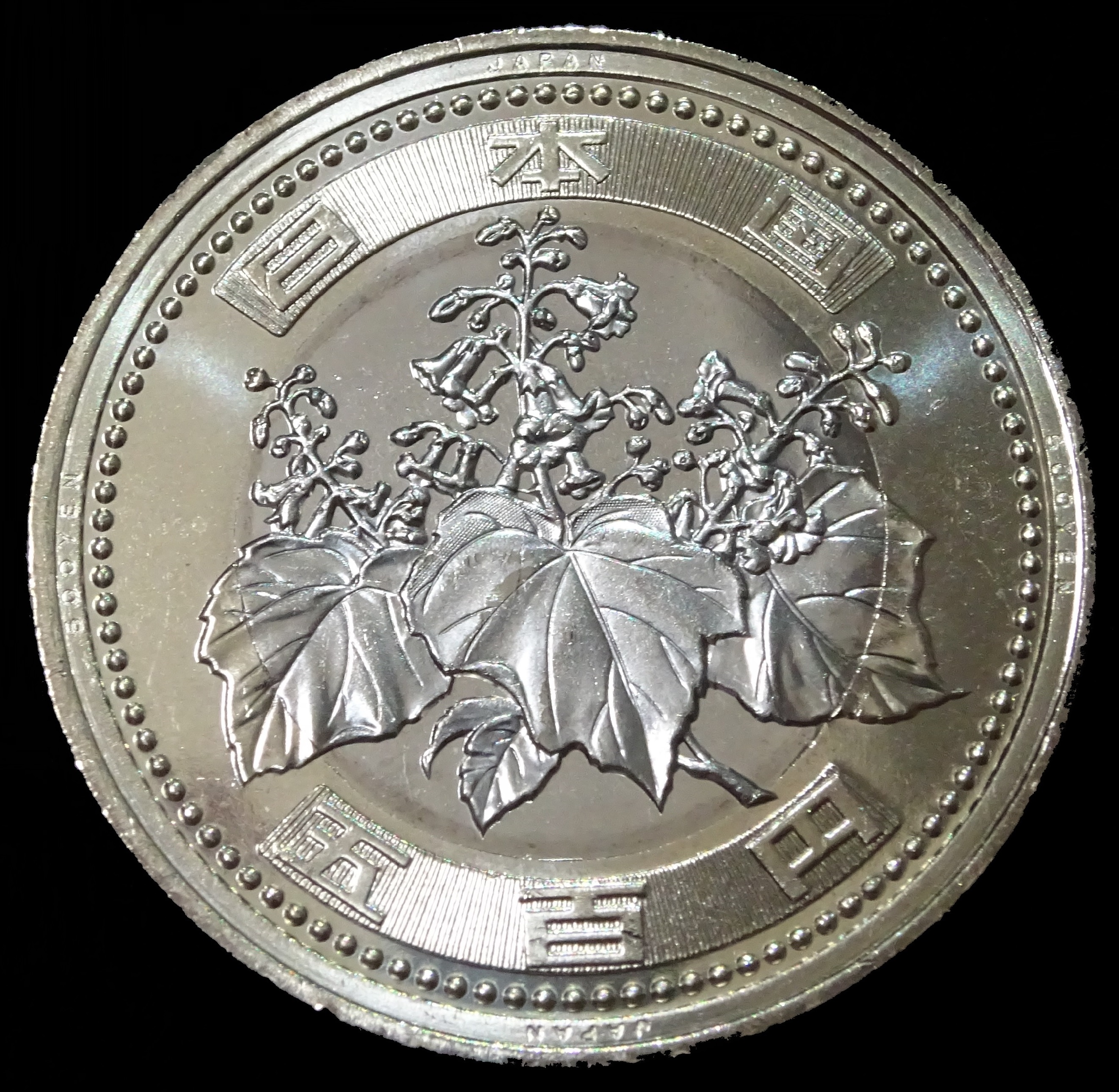
500 yen coin

Paulownia (in Japanese: 桐 tō or kiri) is used in Japan's crest symbol of the prime minister, Cabinet and the Government of Japan in contrast to the chrysanthemum crest used by the Emperor and the Imperial Family. It is one of the suits in the card game hanafuda, associated with the month of December in Japan, or November in Korea.

Japan: An Illustrated Encyclopedia states:

Paulownia wood is very light, fine-grained, and warp-resistant. It is the fastest-growing hardwood. It is used for chests, boxes, and clogs (geta). The wood is burned to make charcoal for sketching and powder for fireworks, the bark is made into a dye. The silvery-grey wood is sliced into veneers for special visiting cards.

Paulownia boxes called tomobako (ともばこ) protect ceramic works and other fragile items during shipment and storage. The lid of the box usually tied down with a flat ribbon called a sanada-himo (真田紐). Japanese wardrobes called tansu (箪笥) as well as much Korean lacquerware is also made from the wood.

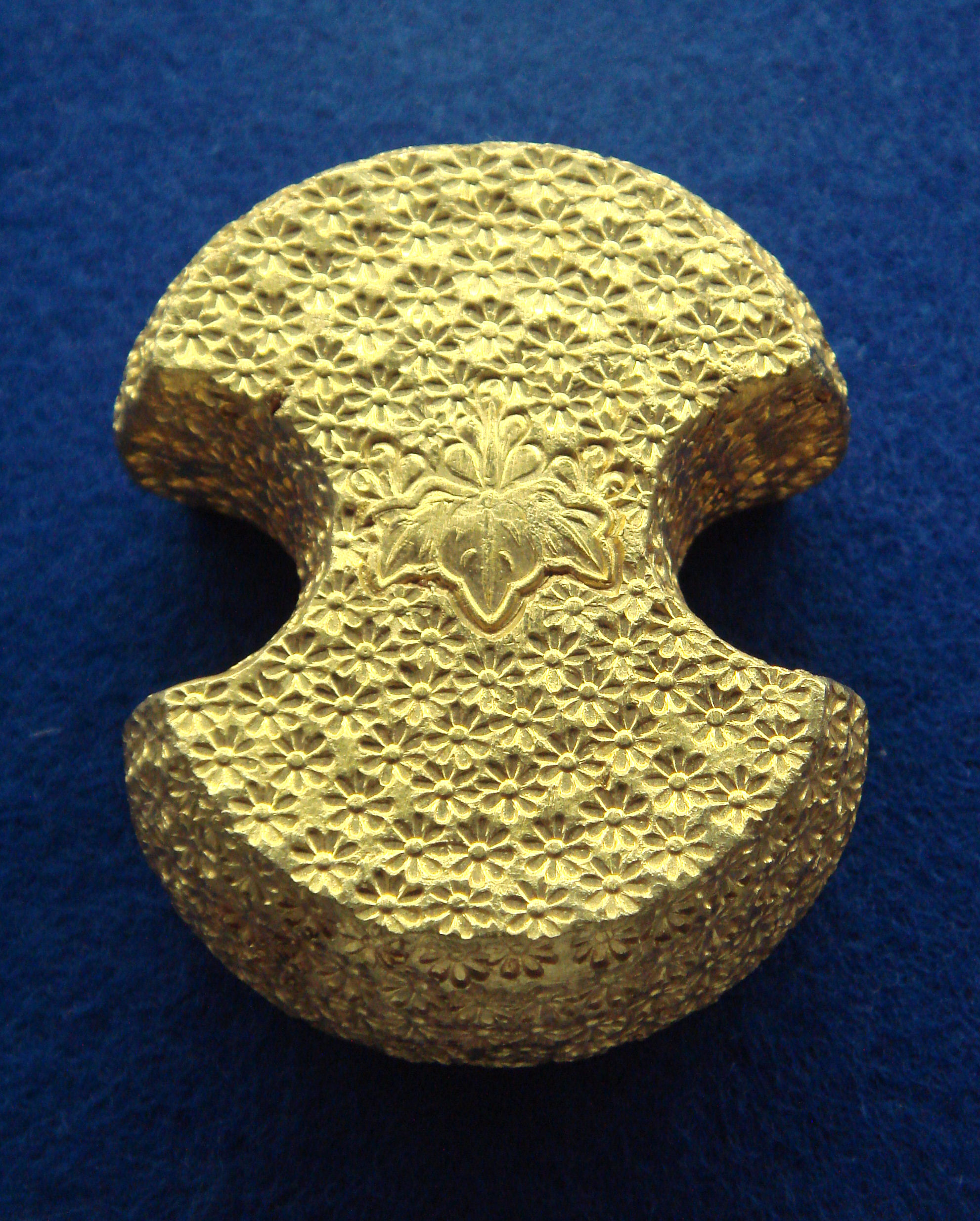
A Japanese Kobundō (小分銅), 95–97% gold, "Paulownia" Kiri (桐) mark, Kikubana (菊花) emblem, 373.11 grams, Japan

== Species ==
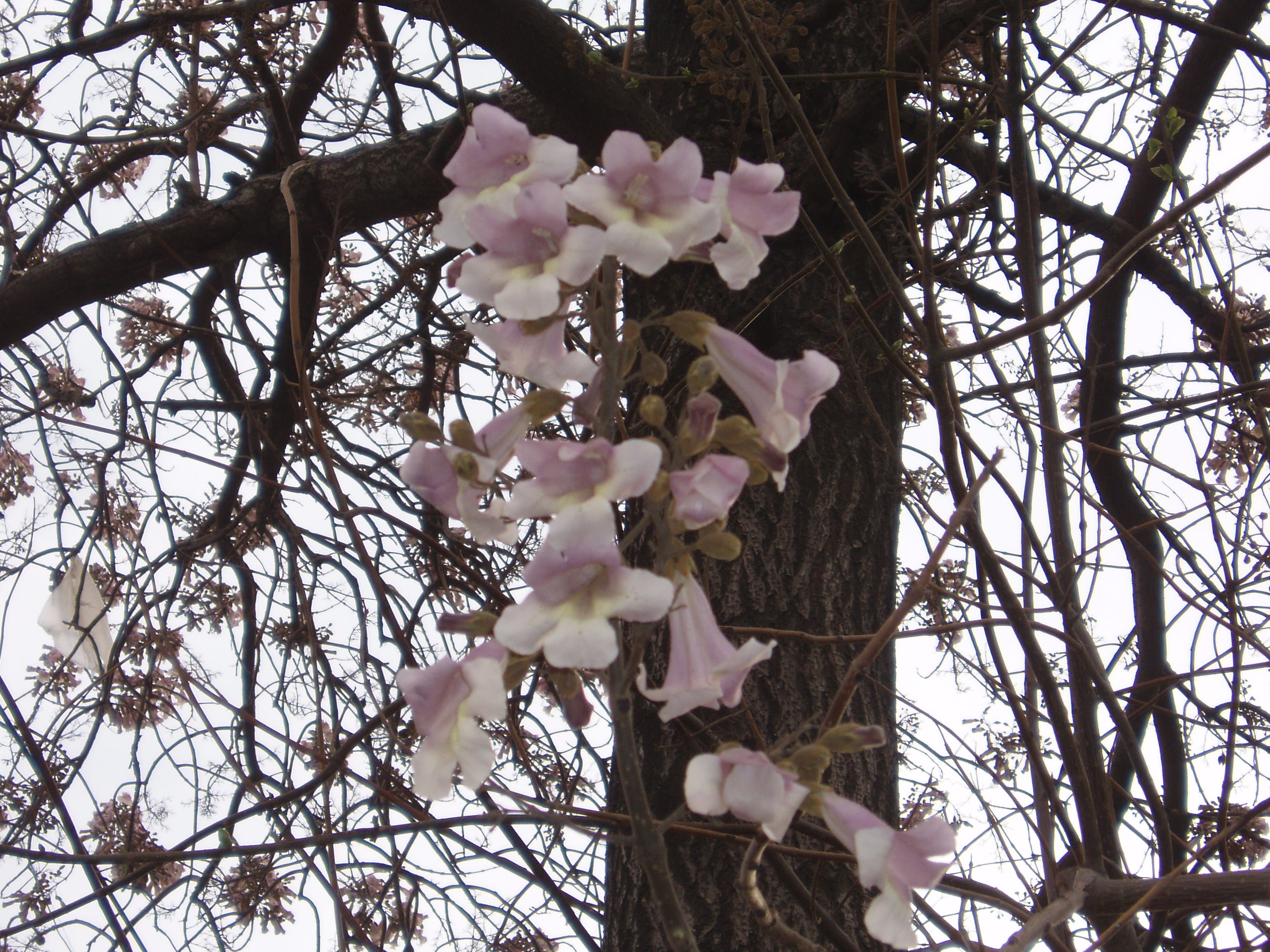
Paulownia fortunei flowers and bark

Tested and confirmed species:

- Paulownia kawakamii
- Paulownia tomentosa
- Paulownia catalpifolia
- Paulownia x taiwaniana
- Paulownia elongata
- Paulownia fargesii
- Paulownia fortunei – dragon tree.

Potential variety, hybrid, and synonym species:

- Paulownia coreana
- Paulownia glabrata
- Paulownia grandifolia
- Paulownia imperialis
- Paulownia australis
- Paulownia lilacina
- Paulownia longifolia
- Paulownia meridionalis
- Paulownia mikado
- Paulownia recurva
- Paulownia rehderiana
- Paulownia shensiensis
- Paulownia silvestrii
- Paulownia thyrsoidea
- Paulownia duclouxii
- Paulownia viscosa
