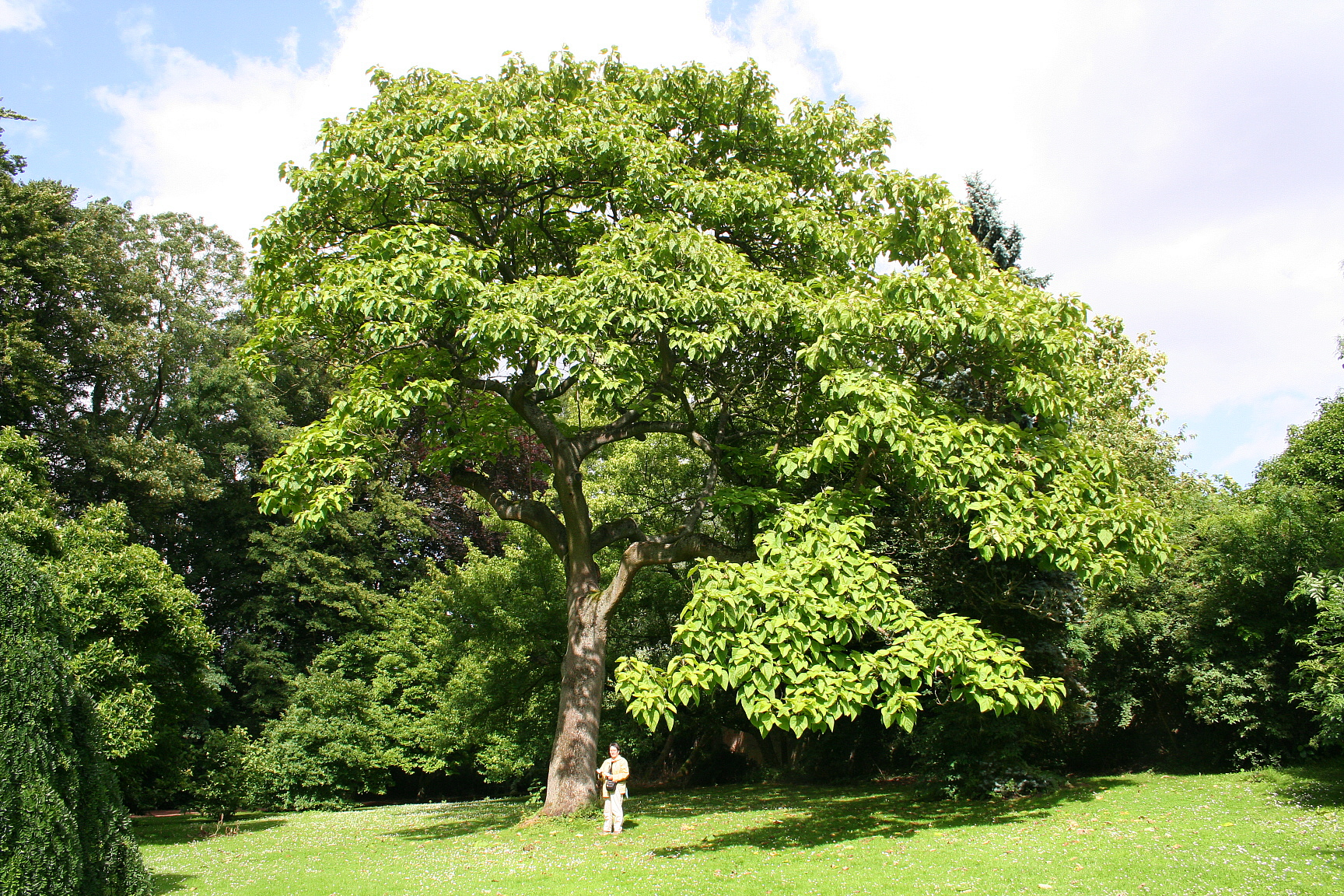

Conservation status
- Least Concern (IUCN 3.1)

Scientific classification
- Kingdom: Plantae
- Clade: Tracheophytes
- Clade: Angiosperms
- Clade: Eudicots
- Clade: Asterids
- Order: Lamiales
- Family: Paulowniaceae
- Genus: Paulownia
- Species: P. tomentosa

Binomial name
- Paulownia tomentosa (Thunb.) Steud.

= Paulownia tomentosa =

Princess tree

Species of deciduous tree classified in its own family

Paulownia tomentosa, common names princess tree, empress tree, or foxglove-tree, is a deciduous hardwood tree in the family Paulowniaceae, native to central and eastern China and the Korean Peninsula. It is the most culturally significant paulownia species across East Asia.

It is an extremely fast-growing tree with seeds that disperse readily and is considered an invasive exotic species in North America that has undergone naturalisation in large areas of the Eastern US, even though seed viability may be low under harsh conditions. P. tomentosa has also been introduced to Western and Central Europe, and is establishing itself as a naturalised species there as well.

== Etymology ==
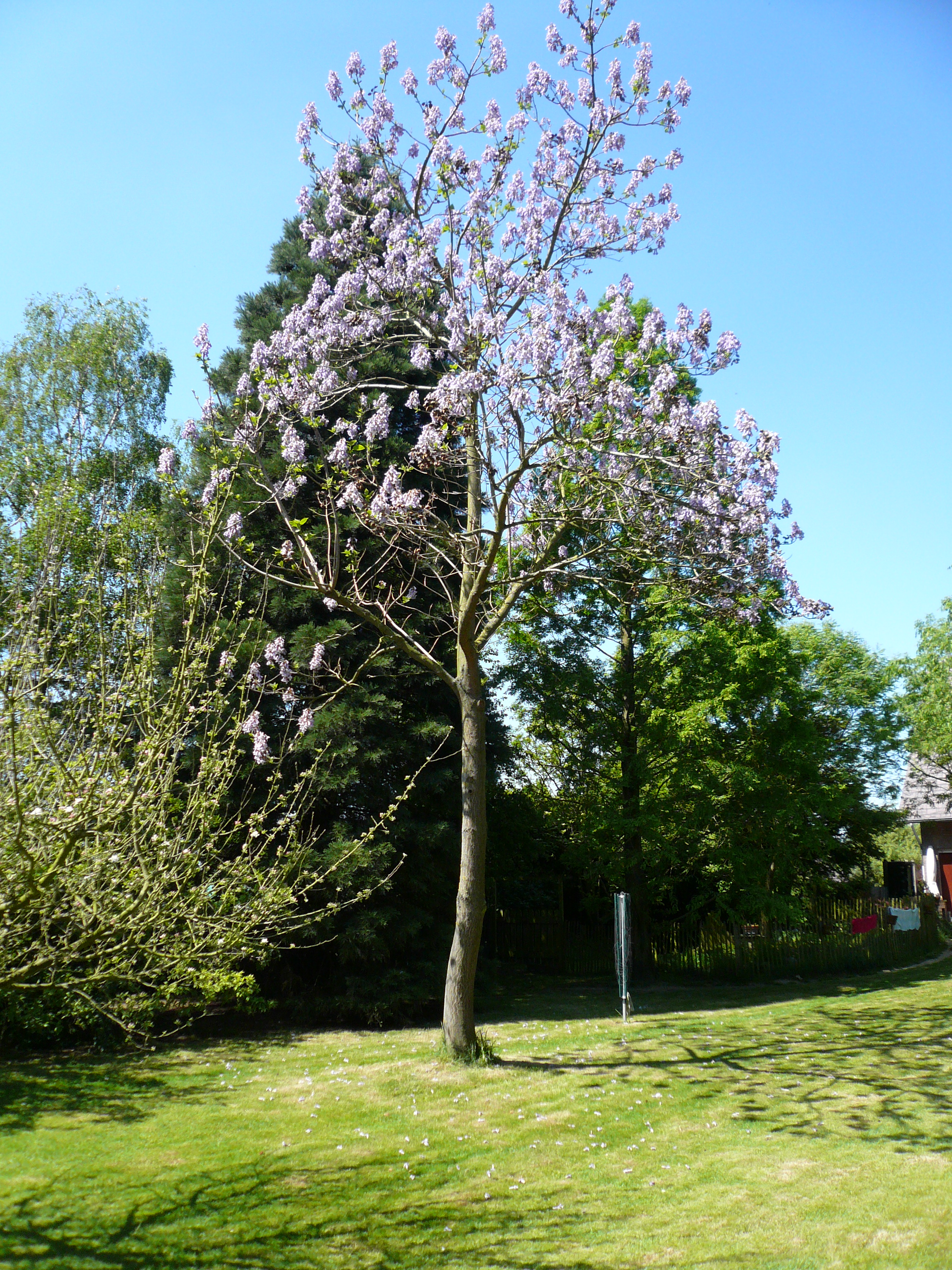

The generic name Paulownia honours Anna Pavlovna of Russia, who was Queen Consort of the Netherlands from 1840 to 1849. The specific epithet tomentosa is a Latin word meaning 'covered in hairs'.

== Description ==
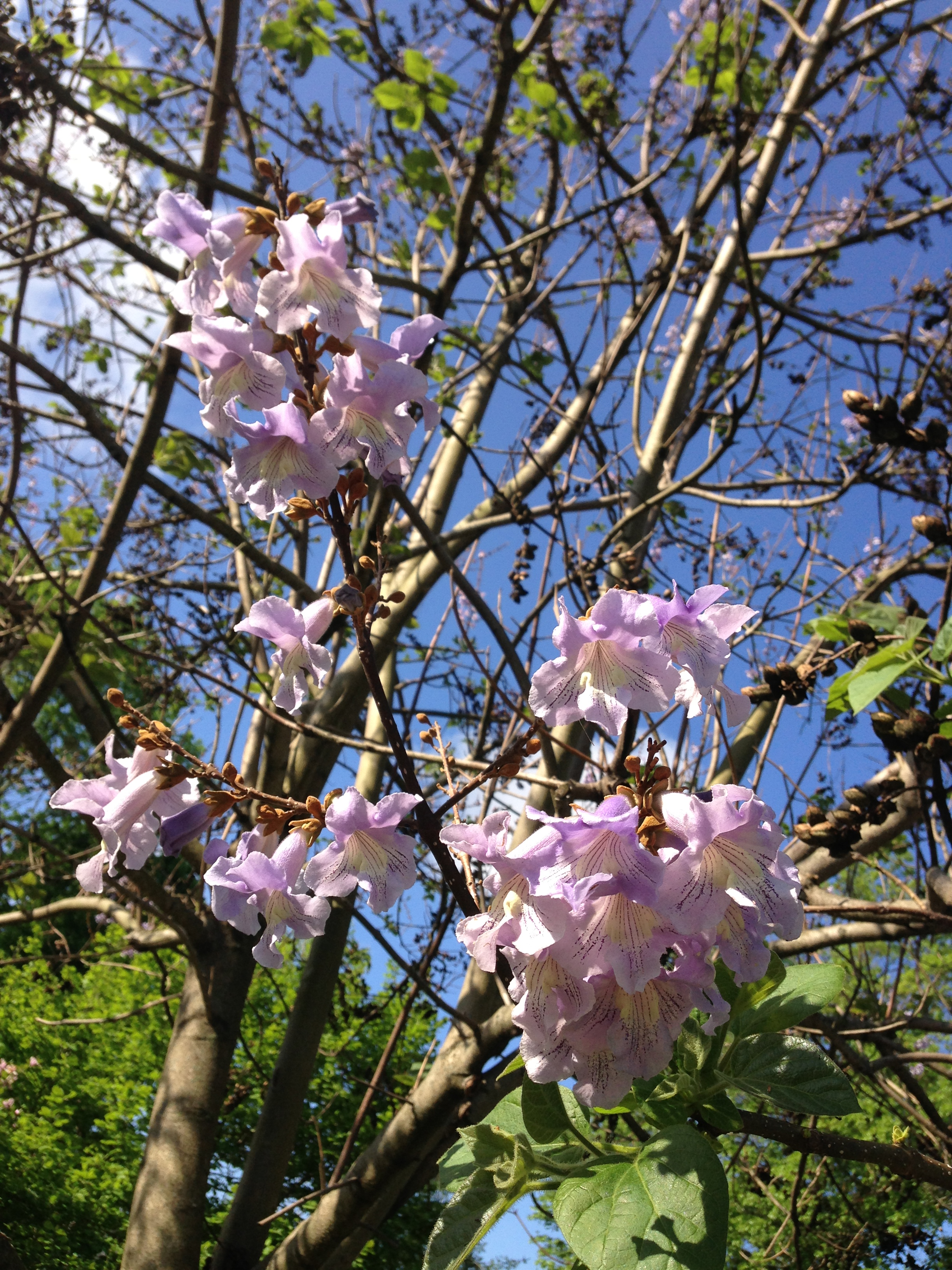

This tree grows 10–25 m (33–82 ft) tall, with large heart-shaped to five-lobed leaves 15–40 cm (6–16 in) across, arranged in opposite pairs on the stem. On young growth, the leaves may be in whorls of three and be much bigger than the leaves on more mature growth. The leaves on stump shoots can achieve remarkable size; leaves 98 centimetres (39 in) wide and almost as long have been reported. Foliage can be mistaken for those of the catalpa, or even the firmiana.

The very fragrant flowers, large and violet-blue in colour are produced before the leaves in early spring, on panicles 10–30 centimetres (4–12 in) long, with a tubular purple corolla 4–6 centimetres (1 1/2–2 1/4 in) long resembling a foxglove flower. The fruit is a dry egg-shaped capsule 3–4 centimetres (1 1/8–1 5/8 in) long, containing numerous tiny seeds. The seeds are winged and disperse by wind and water. Pollarded trees do not produce flowers, as these form only on mature wood.

Paulownia tomentosa requires full sun for proper growth. It is tolerant of pollution and can tolerate many soil types. It can also grow from small cracks in pavements and walls. Paulownia can survive wildfires because the roots can regenerate new, very fast-growing stems.

P. tomentosa is drought-resistant and thrives in barren soil, particularly suitable for cold and arid regions. Its main trunk is short, and its growth rate is relatively slow after it reaches maturity.

== Range ==
=== Native range ===
P. tomentosa is native to much of central and eastern China and to the Korean peninsula; the Flora of China considers the latter as non-native. In China, it occurs in the following provinces: Anhui, Gansu, Hebei, Henan, Hubei, Hunan, Jiangsu, Jiangxi, Liaoning, Shaanxi, Shanxi, Sichuan.

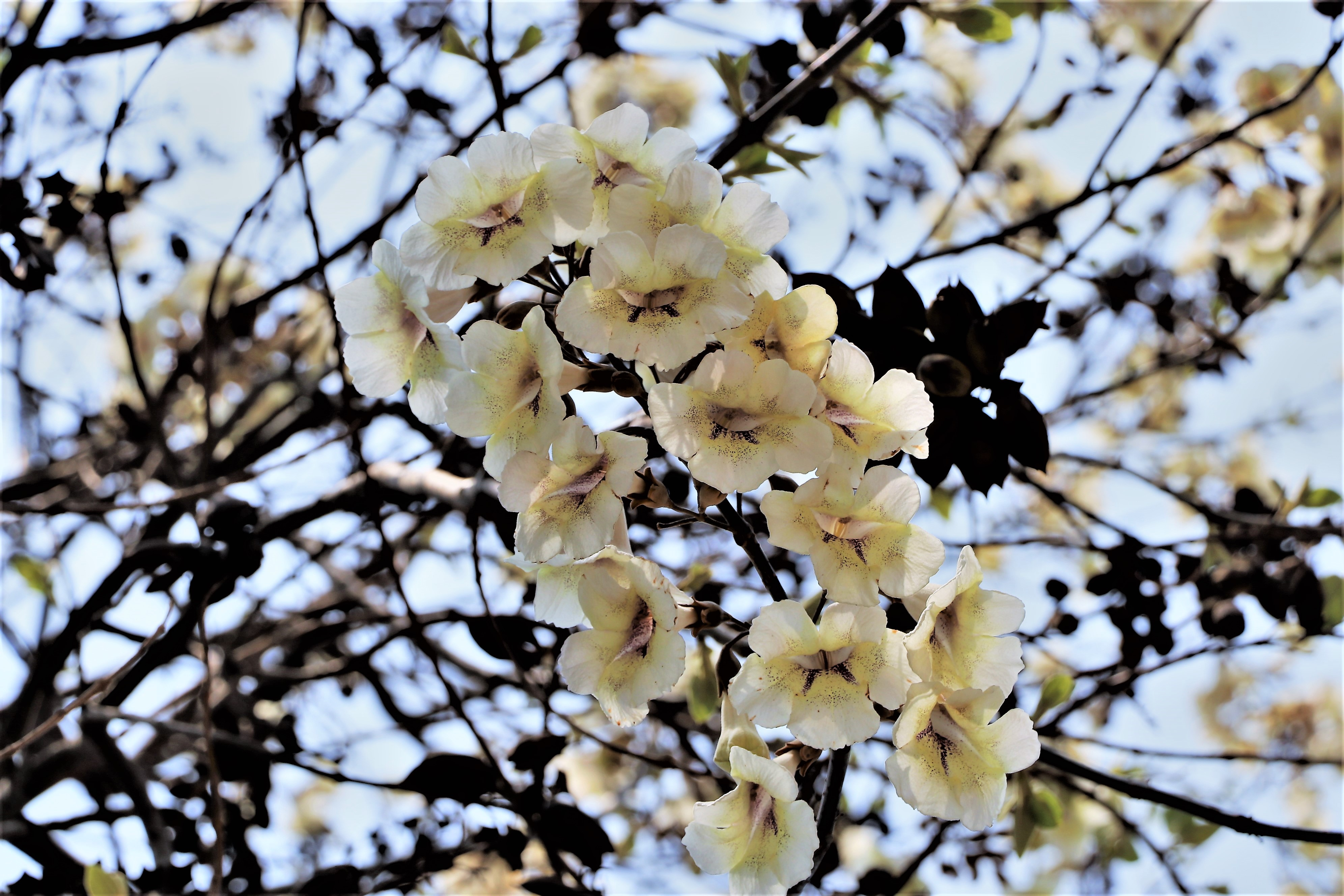

=== Introduced range ===
==== Asia ====
Japan

==== Europe ====
In August 2021 the EPPO added P. tomentosa to its Alert List, not due to any particular known problem within Europe, but as a step to begin assessing whether it should be regarded as a problematic invader.

- Austria, Belgium, Poland, Czech Republic, France (including Corsica), Germany, Hungary, Italy (including Sardinia and Sicily), Slovenia, Switzerland, United Kingdom

==== Africa ====
- South Africa

==== North America ====
===== United States =====
- Alabama, Arkansas, Connecticut, Delaware, Florida, Georgia, Hawaii, Kentucky, Louisiana, Maryland, Massachusetts, Minnesota, Mississippi, Missouri, New Jersey, New York, North Carolina, Ohio, Oklahoma, Oregon, Pennsylvania, South Carolina, Tennessee, Texas, Virginia, Washington, West Virginia

==== Oceania ====
- New Zealand

== Uses ==
Paulownia tomentosa is cultivated as an ornamental tree in parks and gardens. It has gained the Royal Horticultural Society's Award of Garden Merit.

Because of its tolerance and flexibility, Paulownia functions ecologically as a pioneer plant. Its nitrogen-rich leaves provide good fodder and its roots prevent soil erosion. Eventually, Paulownia is succeeded by taller trees that shade it and in whose shade it cannot thrive.

The characteristic large size of the young growth is exploited by gardeners: by pollarding the tree and ensuring there is vigorous new growth every year, massive leaves are produced (up to 60 centimetres (24 in) across). These are popular in the modern style of gardening which uses large-foliaged and "architectural" plants.

The soft, lightweight seeds were commonly used as a packing material by Chinese porcelain exporters in the 19th century, before the development of polystyrene packaging. Packing cases would often leak or burst open in transit and scatter the seeds along rail tracks. The magnitude of the numbers of seeds used for packaging, together with seeds deliberately planted for ornament, has allowed the species to be viewed as an invasive species in areas where the climate is suitable for its growth, notably Japan and the eastern United States.

In Japan, it is customary to plant seeds of the tree when a couple has a daughter; it is said that by the time the daughter is in her older teens or at the peak of adulthood when she is ready to marry, the tree by this time has also grown to maturity, which is then felled and made into a tansu dresser as a wedding gift. The timber is used in making instruments, as well.

P. tomentosa has been suggested as a plant to use in carbon capture projects. P. tomentosa has large leaves that readily absorb pollutants, and also has value in timber and aesthetics, adding to interest surrounding its use in carbon capture.

Inaccurate citation practices have led to circulating claims that P. tomentosa performs C_{4} carbon fixation. However, this species does not fulfill the experimental criteria necessary to demonstrate C_{4} photosynthesis.

== Composition ==
Some geranyl flavonoids can be found in P. tomentosa. Verbascoside can also be produced in hairy roots cultures of P. tomentosa.

== Pictures ==
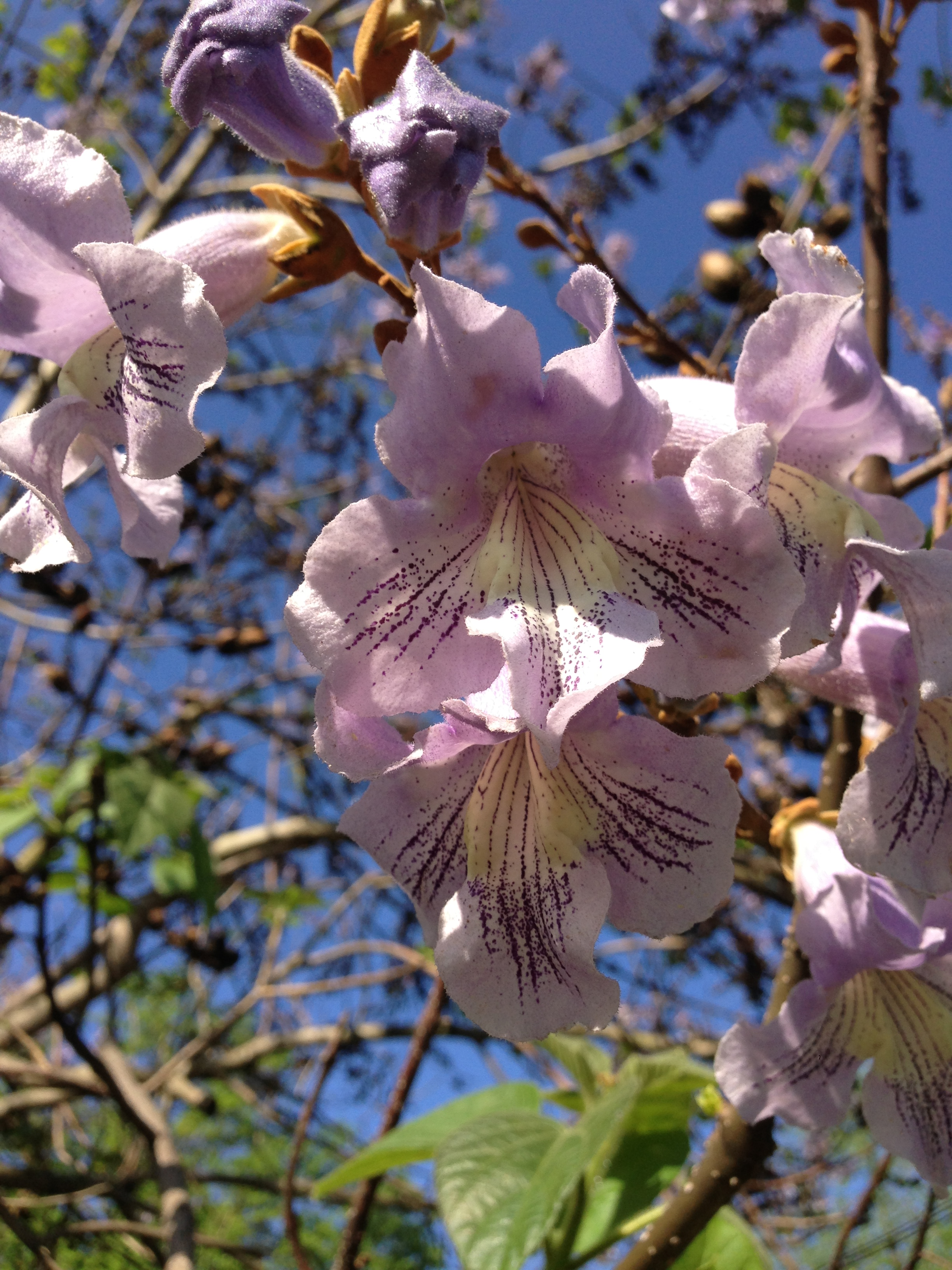

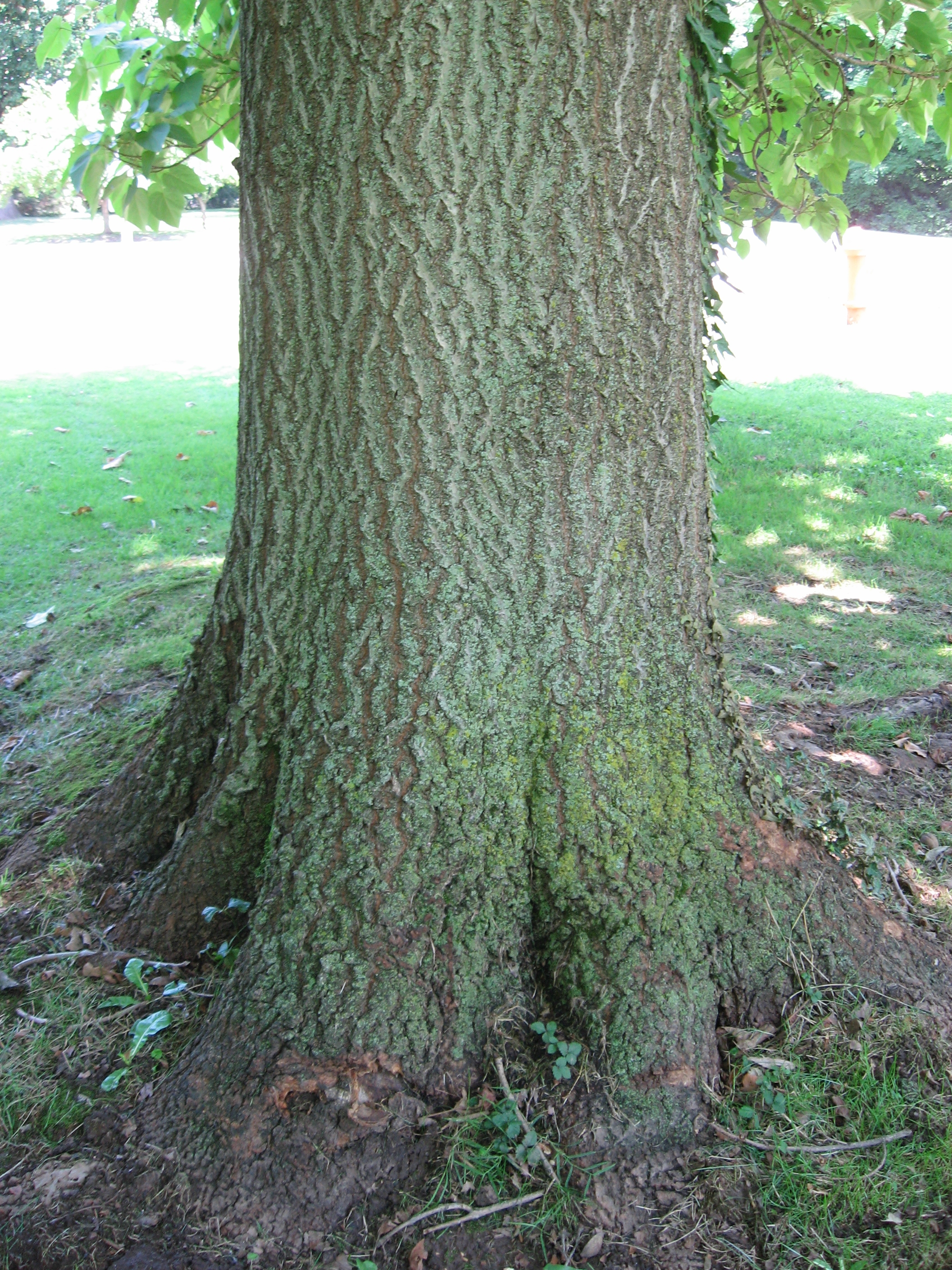

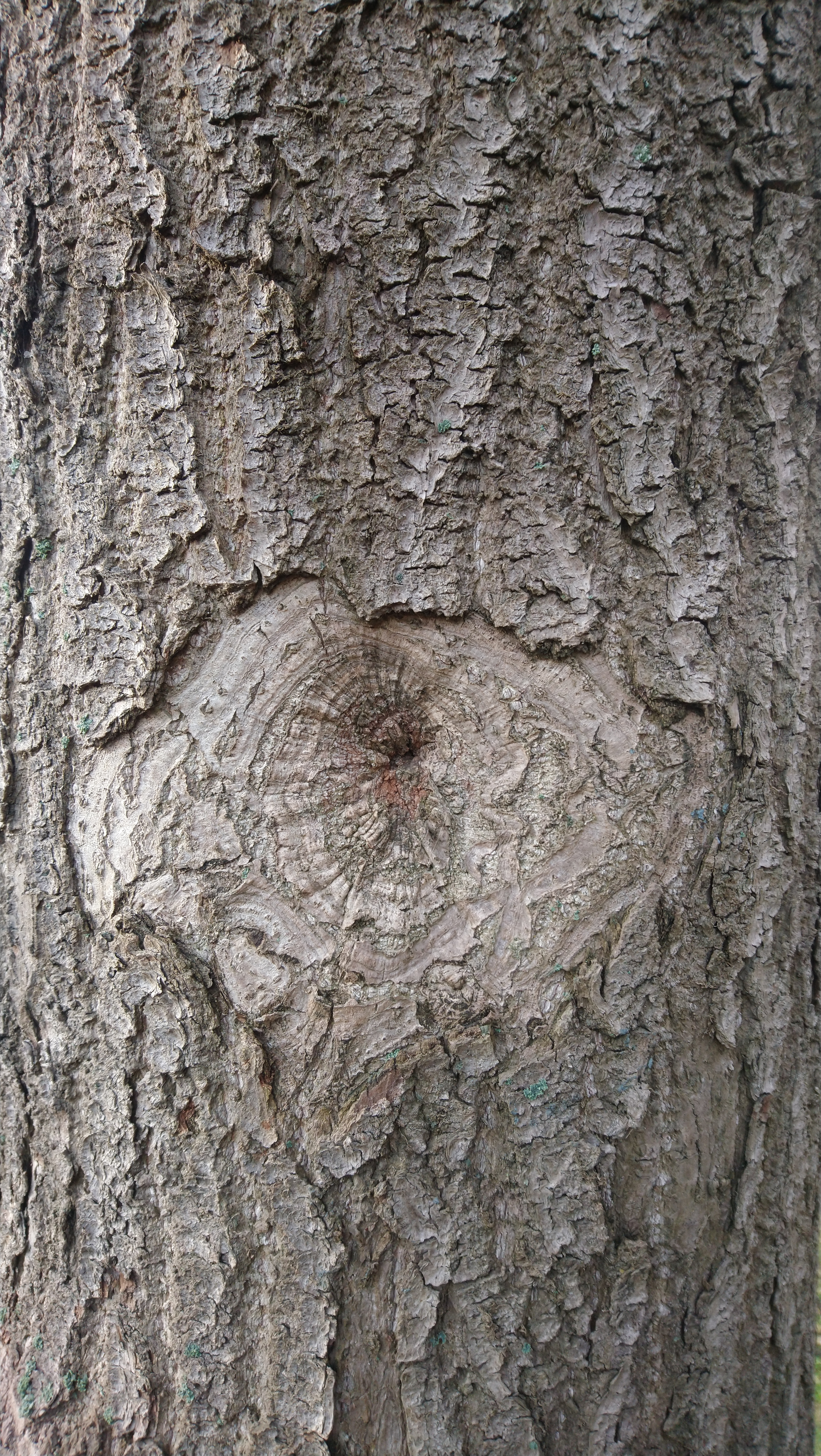

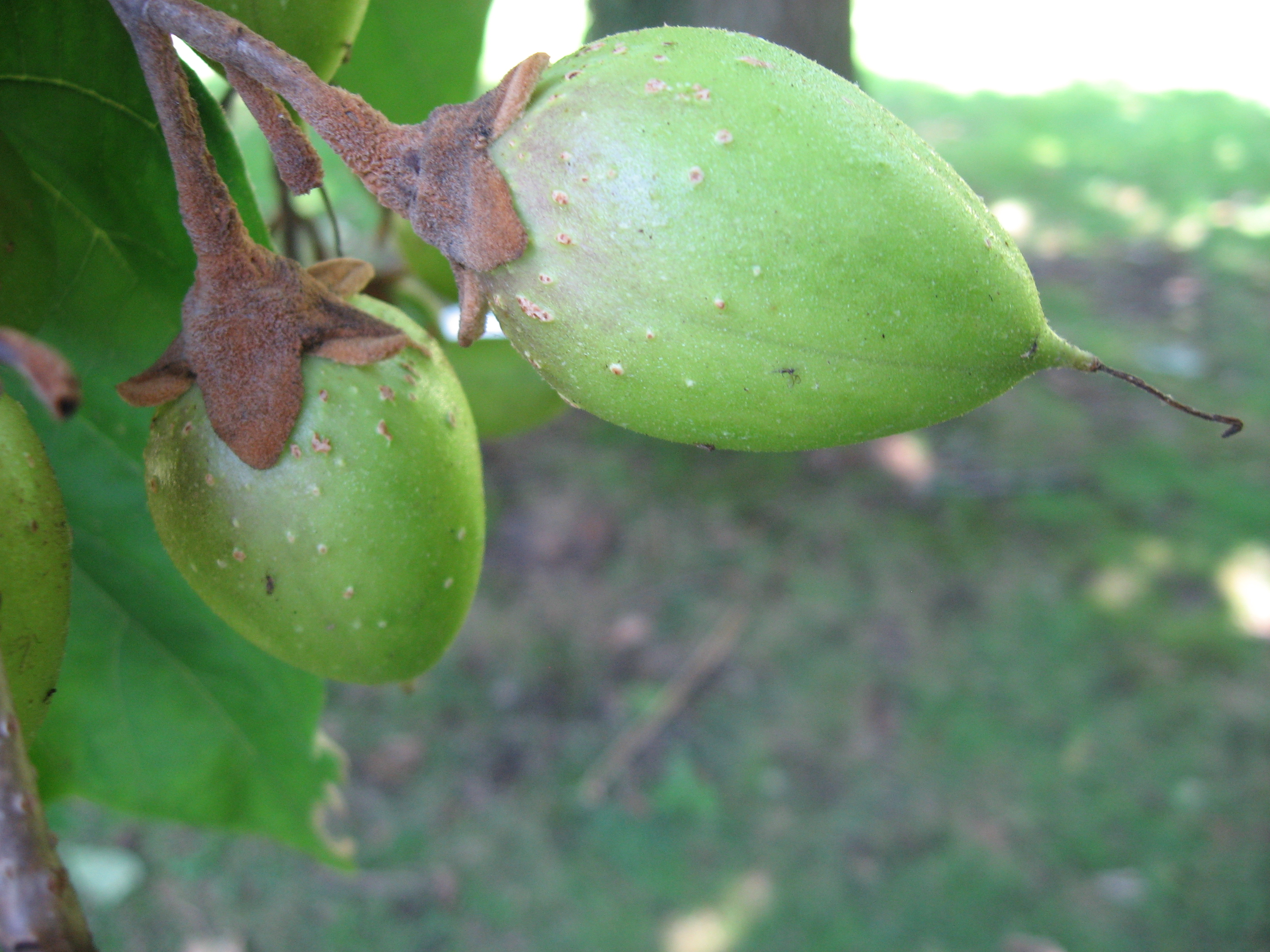

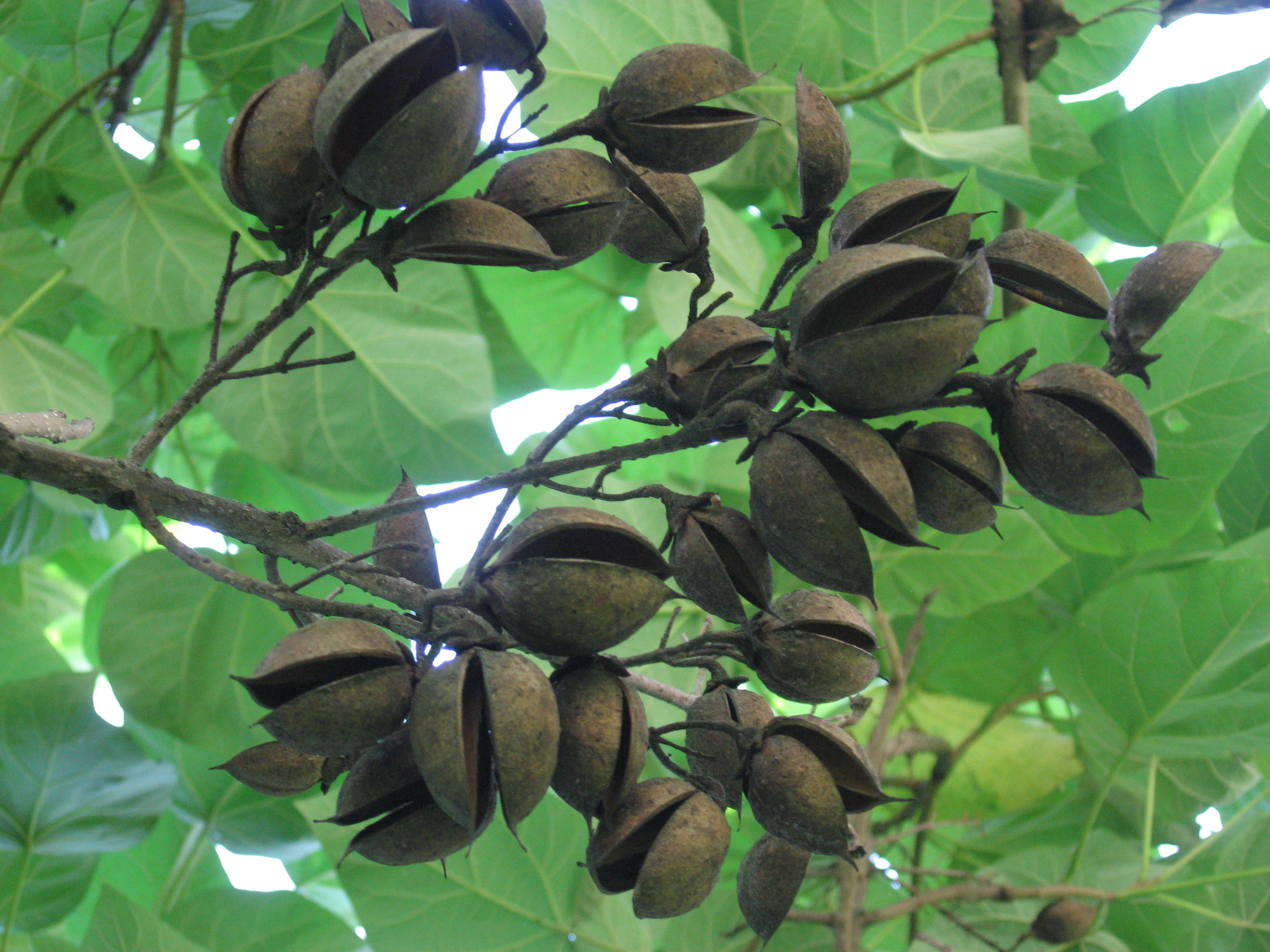
Spent fruit

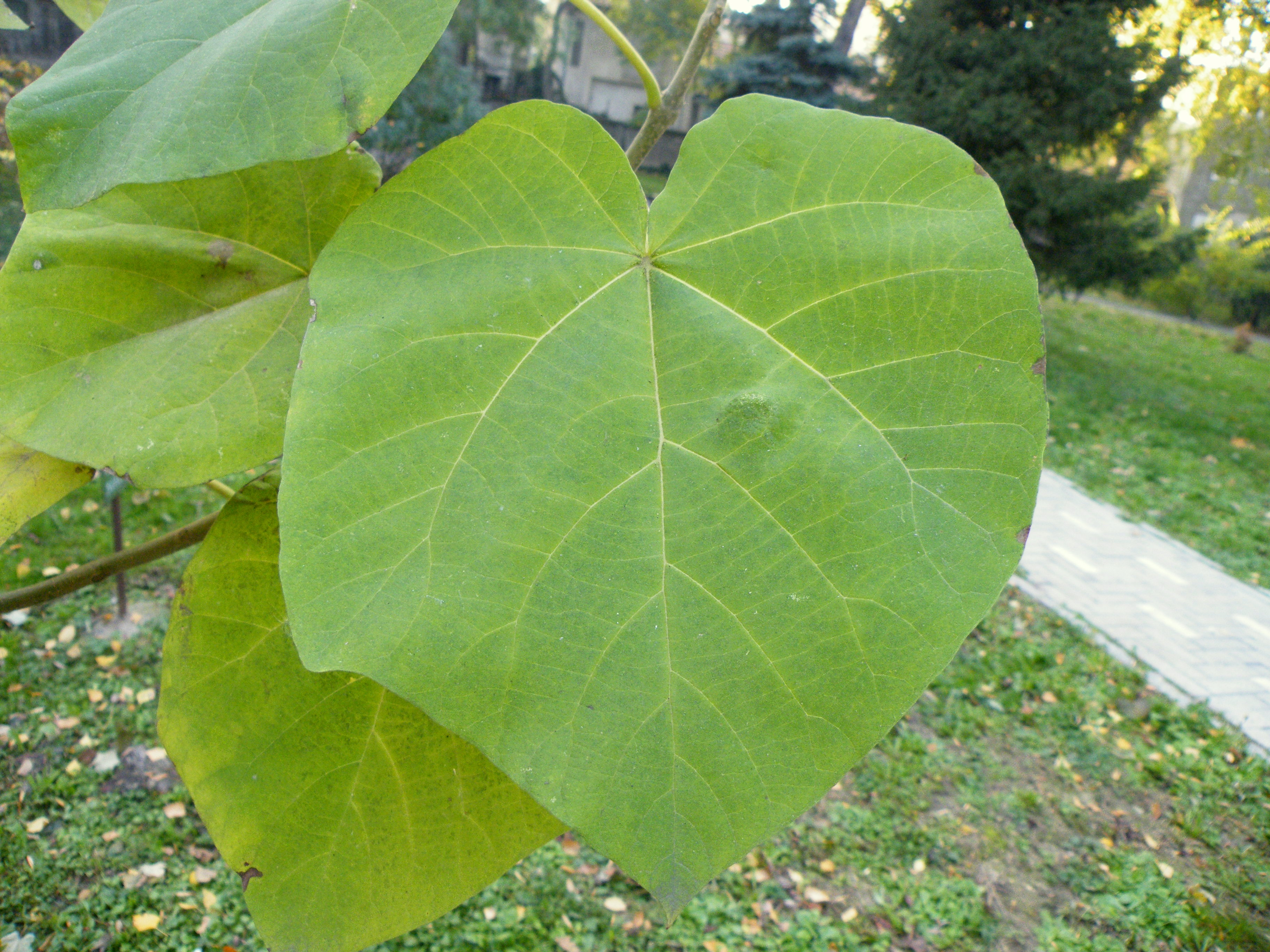

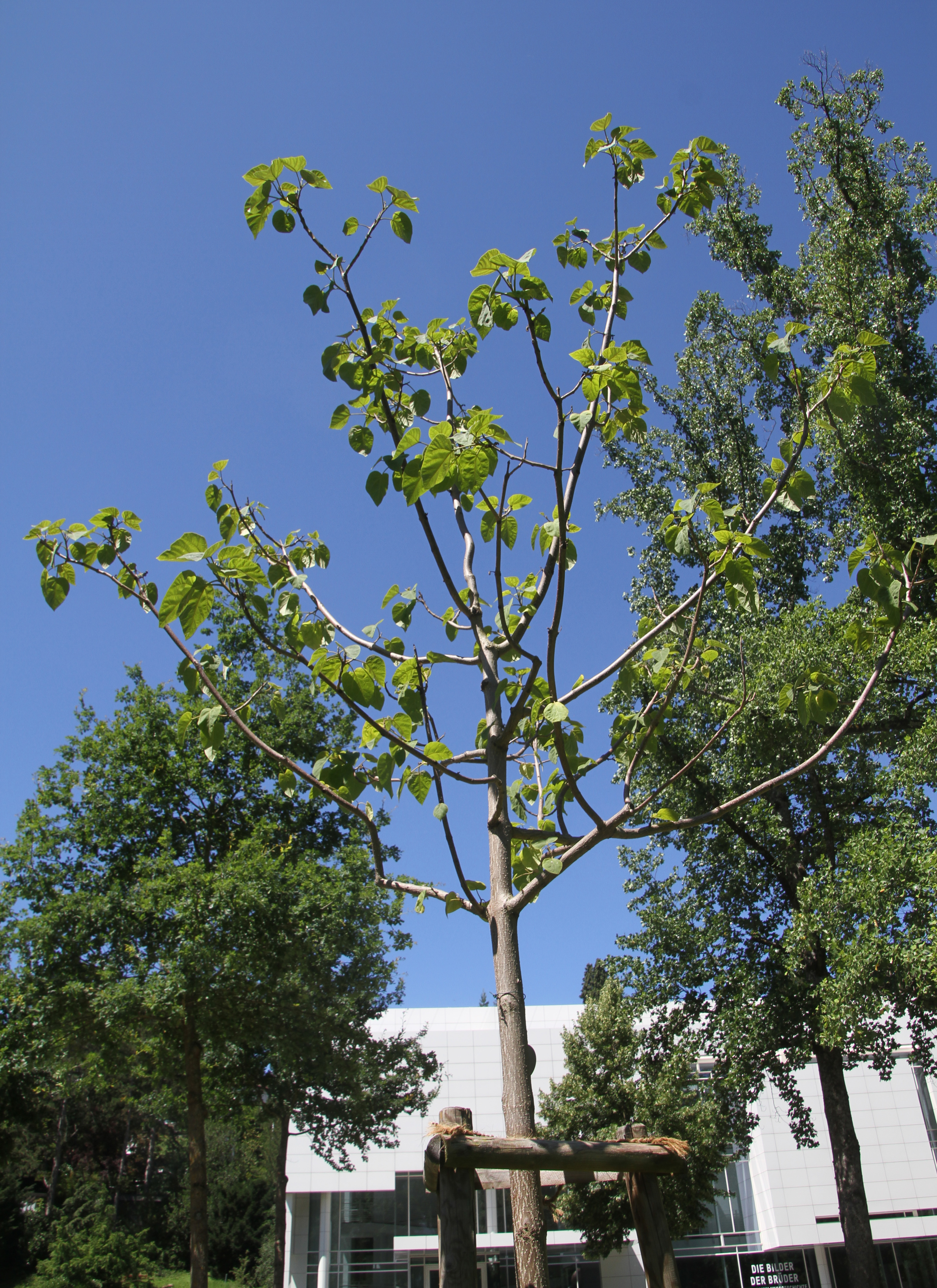

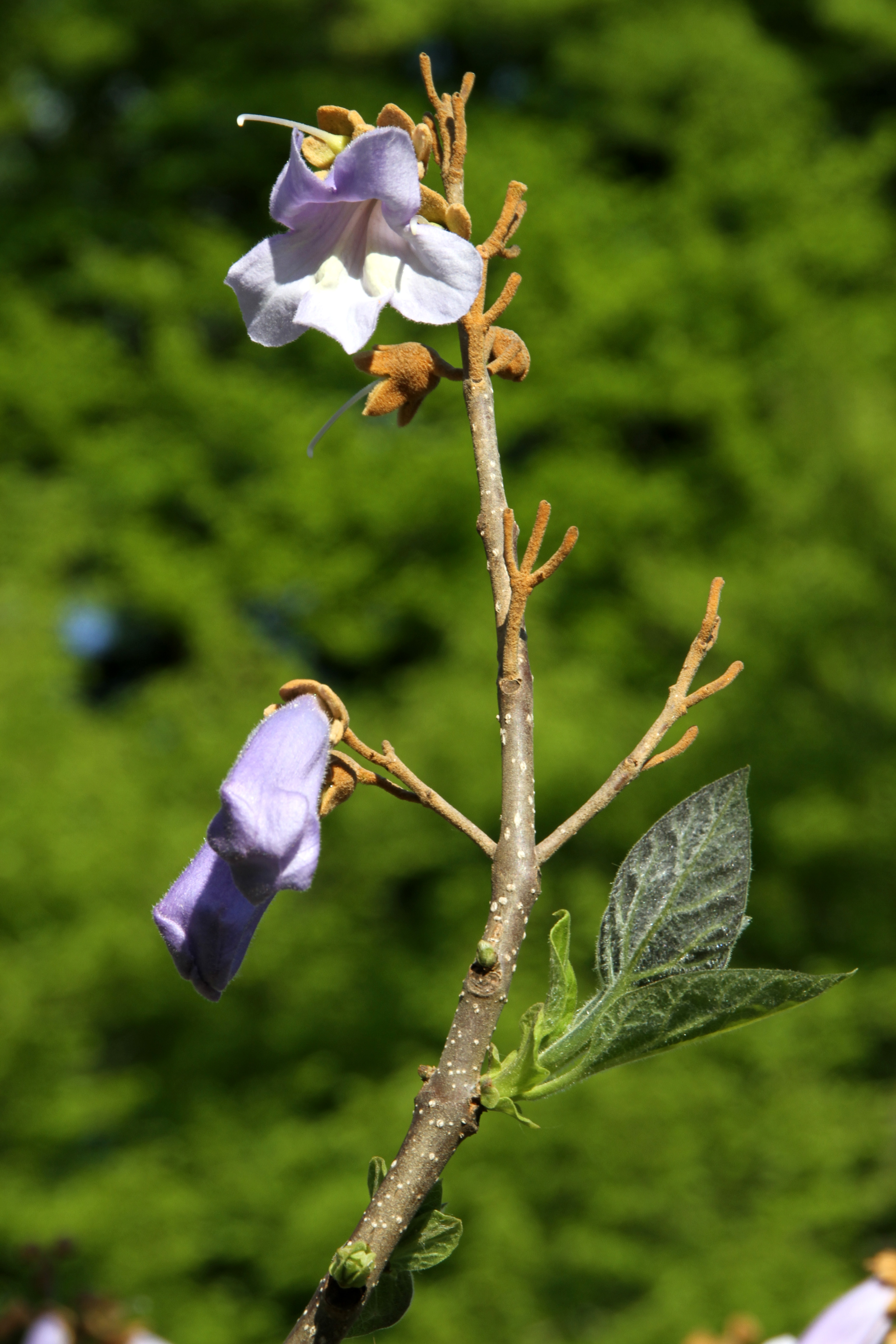

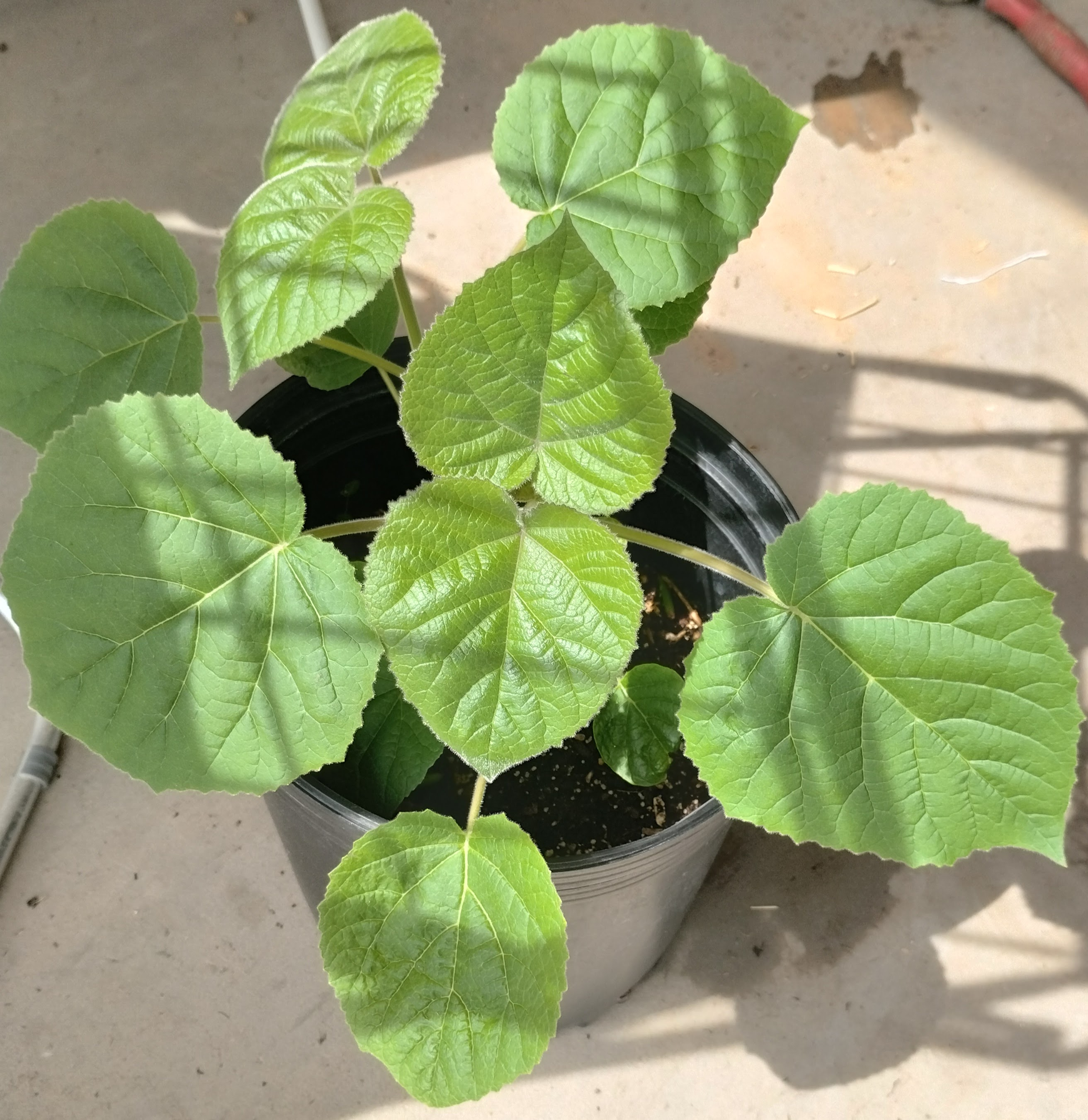
New growth on second-year sapling

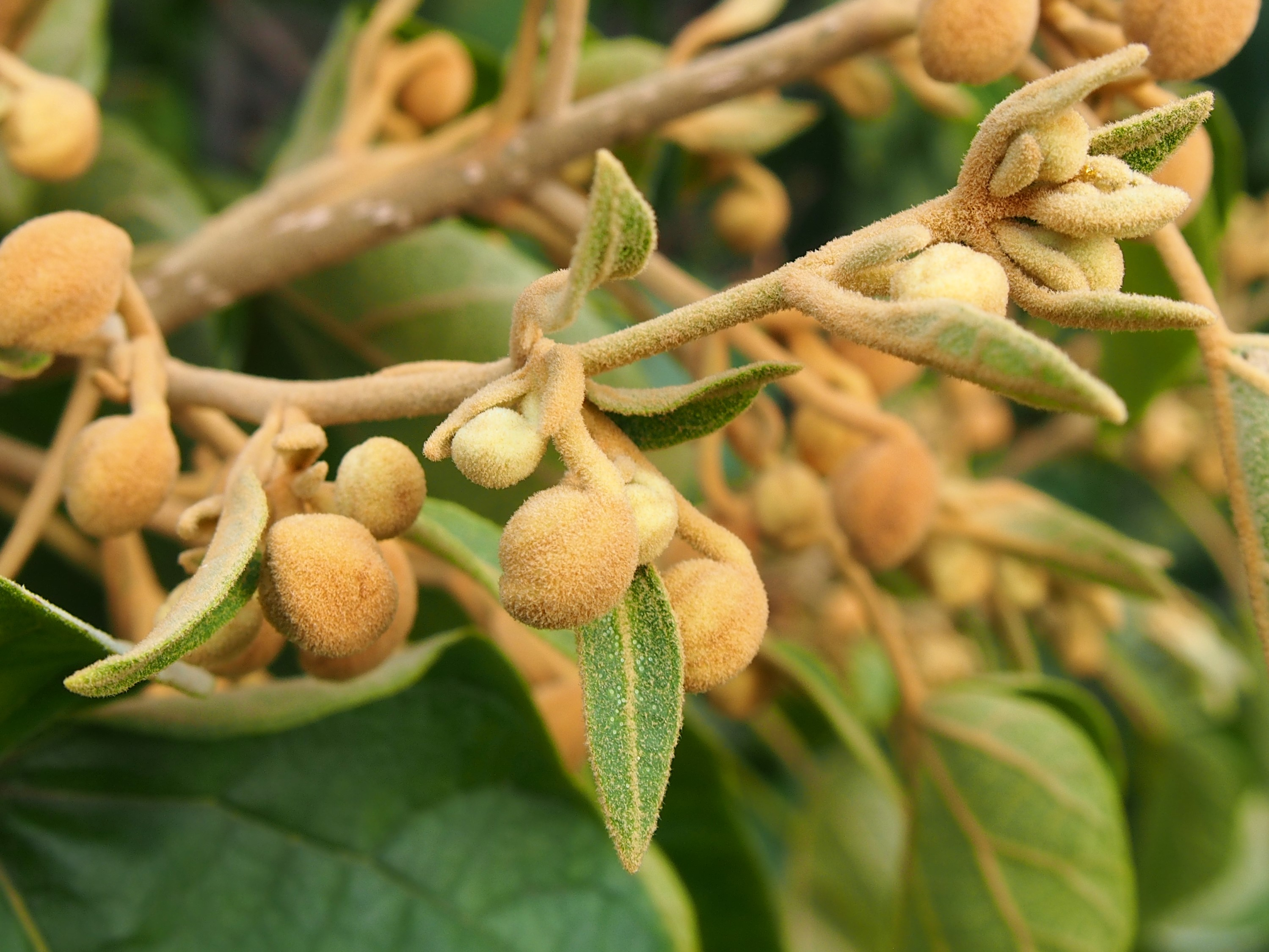
Flower buds

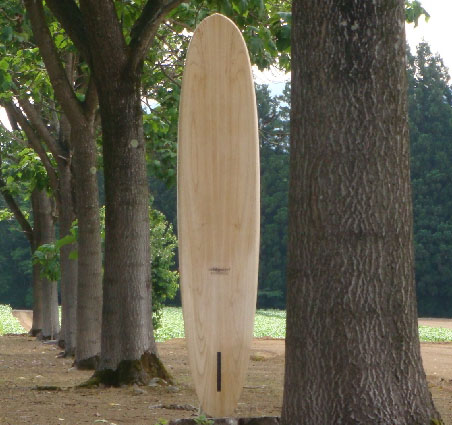
Timber

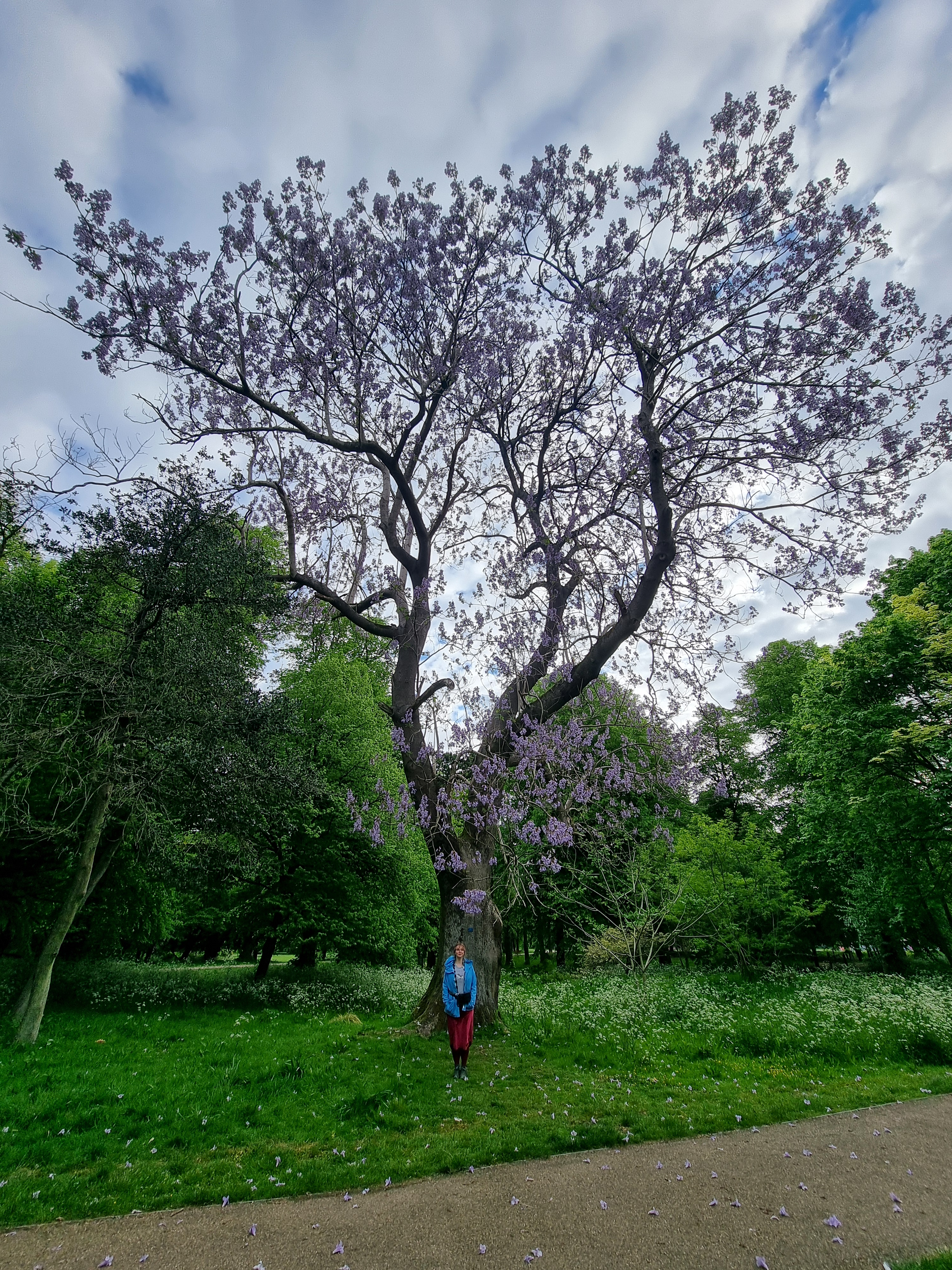
Image showing a Large Mature Foxglove Tree in flower on May 4, 2025 in Bute Park, Wales, UK. Human for scale.
