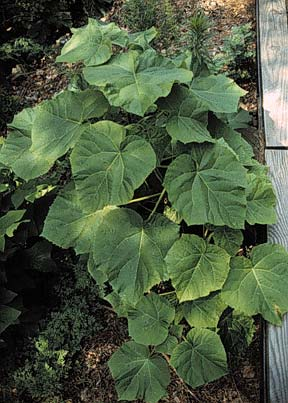
- Young Paulownia tomentosa foliage

Scientific classification
- Kingdom: Plantae
- Clade: Tracheophytes
- Clade: Angiosperms
- Clade: Eudicots
- Clade: Asterids
- Order: Lamiales
- Family: Paulowniaceae; Nakai

Genera
- Paulownia; Shiuyinghua; Wightia

= Paulowniaceae =

Family of trees

Paulowniaceae are a family of flowering plants within the Lamiales. They are a monophyletic family of trees with currently 12 species in 3 genera. They were formerly placed within Scrophulariaceae sensu lato, or as a segregate of the Bignoniaceae.

The Paulowniaceae are now resolved as a distinct separate family consisting of the genera Paulownia, Shiuyinghua and Wightia. They are deciduous trees with large heart shaped leaves and long panicles of white-purple to lavender flowers native to eastern Asia. The most widely distributed and recognized species is Paulownia tomentosa with common names such as Princess tree, Empress tree, Kiri tree, Foxglove tree, and Phoenix tree.

== Taxonomy ==
There are 12 confirmed species of Paulowniaceae with potentially more as hybrid, variety, or mismatched synonym species.

- Genus Paulownia
  - Paulownia catalpafolia
  - Paulownia elongata
  - Paulownia fargesii
  - Paulownia fortunei
  - Paulownia kawakamii
  - Paulownia laotica
  - Paulownia tomentosa
  - Paulownia taiwaniana
  - Paulownia x henanensis
- Genus Shiuyinghua
  - Shiuyinghua silvestrii
- Genus Wightia
  - Wightia borneensis
  - Wightia speciosissima

== Phylogeny ==
Paulowniaceae is sister to the Orobanchaceae, a primarily hemi-holoparasitic plant family, except for the clade of herbaceous genera Lindenbergia, Rehmannia, and Triaenophora. Sister to the Orobanchaceae-Paulowniaceae clade is Phrymaceae. Phrymaceae are mostly herbaceous plants with a widespread distribution.

As of August 2017, The Plant List accepted four genera in the family. However of these four genera currently only Paulownia is a recognized member of Paulowniaceae.

- Paulownia
- Brandisia is settled in the Orobanchaceae as sister to the Pterygiella due to molecular data from 9 chloroplast markers and samples from 6 of the 11 Brandisia species. They are a mostly shrublike family with hemi-parasitic characters that sometimes grow like climbing vines. Morphological similarities between Bradisia and Pterygiella, such as eglandular hairs on their capsules, reticulate seeds, and similar shaped tricolpate pollen, confirm their close relationship.
- Wightia is now tentatively positioned as a sister group to Phrymaceae due to many morphological similarities as well as support by chloroplast and mitochondrial DNA analysis. They are a small genus of two species in Southeast Asia, that can grow as a shrub or tree, or as hemiepiphetic pseudo-vine. There are still morphological characters as well as nuclear genome data to support Wightia as sister to Paulownia leading it to be of proposed hybrid origin from Phrymaceae and Paulowniaceae. This theory, based on chloroplast genome evidence, would explain its morphological similarities to both families. However the conflicts between the chloroplast, mitochondrial, and nuclear phylogenetic data make it unclear. If these were tested further and proven to be correct it should place Wightia as a new family Wightiaceae. Though according to Liu et al., 2019, Wightia should already be its own distinct family as it is highly unlikely that any new study would provide more questionable data against this theory.
- Shiuyinghua is an accepted genus on The Plant List and is listed under Paulowniaceae, but there is no updated published work on the phylogeny of the genus or its species Shiuyinghua silvestrii. Shiuyinghua has a history of being placed under the name Catalpa silvestrii in Bignoniaceae due to its leaf shape, but then as Paulownia silvestrii in the clade Paulownieae in Scrophulariaceae due to similarities in lateral and terminal inflorescences, and in the five-lobed calyx structure. In 1959 S. silvestrii was believed to be a distinct species within the Paulownieae tribe due to the overall flower bud shape being significantly different from all other members of Paulownia. The genus was named after Dr. Shiu-ying Hu of Harvard University's Arnold Arboretum. Since then there has been no more evidence or discussion on its placement, nor any available molecular data on a species under the name Shiuyinghua silvestrii or Paulownia silvestrii.
