= Mazus arenarius =

Conservation status
- Declining (NZ TCS)

Scientific classification
- Kingdom: Plantae
- Clade: Tracheophytes
- Clade: Angiosperms
- Clade: Eudicots
- Clade: Asterids
- Order: Lamiales
- Family: Mazaceae
- Genus: Mazus
- Species: M. arenarius

Binomial name
- Mazus arenarius Heenan, P.N.Johnson & C.J.Webb

Species of flowering plant

Mazus arenarius is a perennial, rhizomatous herb in the family Mazaceae, and is endemic to New Zealand. Its native range is from Southland and Otago in the southern South Island to Rakiura Stewart Island. It grows in herbfields and sand dune hollows in coastal areas. The species was described by New Zealand botanists Peter Heenan, Colin Webb and Peter Johnson in 1996. The species differs from M. radicans by its smaller flowers, shorter peduncle and leaves that have a uniform colour (no blotches), fruit with a rounded tip, and smaller seeds.

Mazus arenarius is an uncommon plant with the conservation status of At Risk - Declining according to the most recent conservation assessment.
