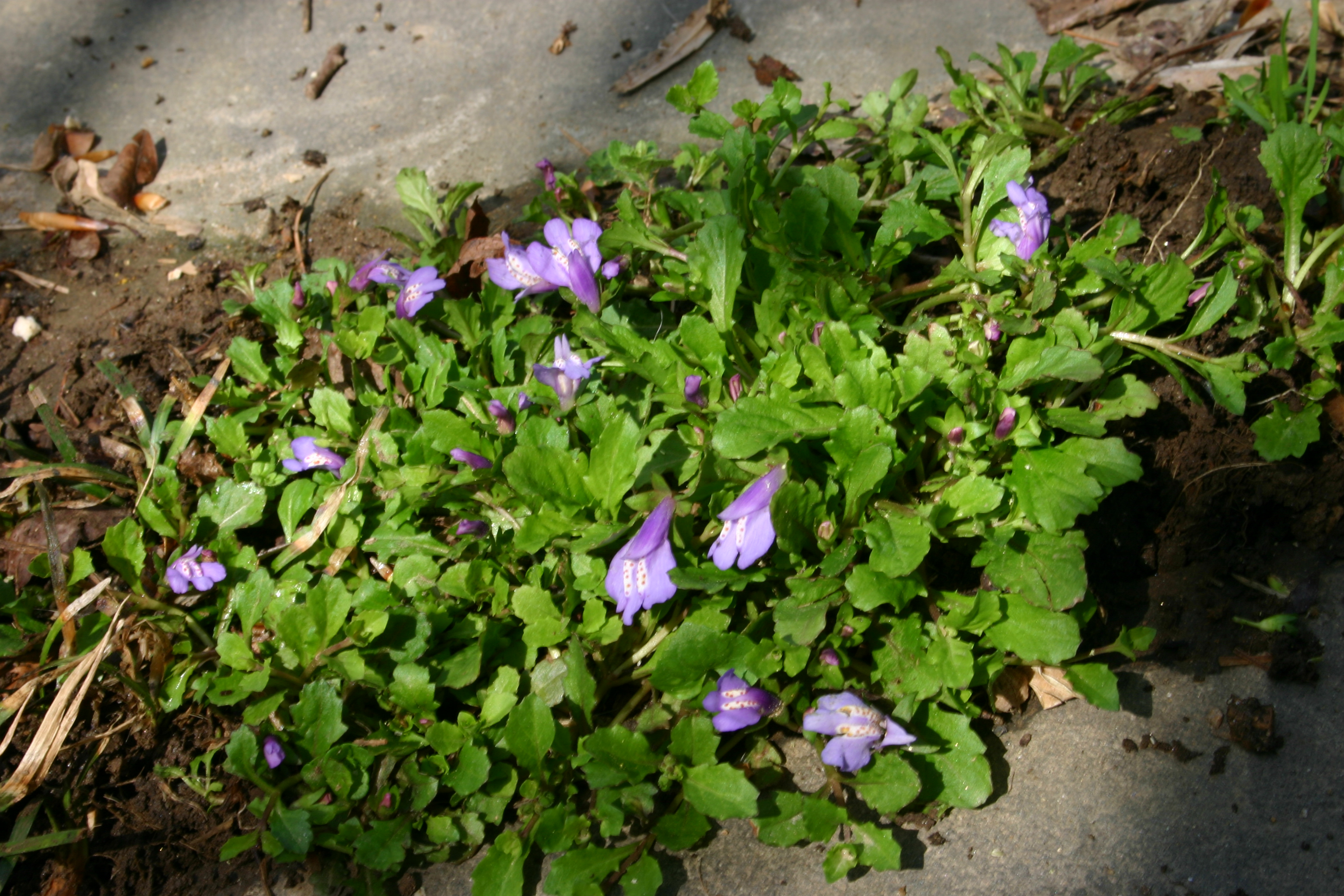

Scientific classification
- Kingdom: Plantae
- Clade: Tracheophytes
- Clade: Angiosperms
- Clade: Eudicots
- Clade: Asterids
- Order: Lamiales
- Family: Mazaceae
- Genus: Mazus
- Species: M. reptans

Binomial name
- Mazus reptans N.E.Br.

= Mazus reptans =

Species of flowering plant in the family Mazaceae

Mazus reptans, common name creeping mazus, is a heterotypic synonym of Mazus miquelii, a low-growing perennial plant native to the East Asia, and widely introduced in the United States.

== Description ==
Mazus reptans is a herbaceous plant with alternate, simple leaves, on creeping and rooting stems. It grows less than 15 centimetres (6 in), with a spread of 15–30 centimetres (6–12 in).

The purple-blue to white flowers are borne in spring and summer. The flower crown is 2-lipped and violet-blue to pink or white, inside with white and yellow spots. The period of bloom lasts from Spring through Summer.

The capsule fruits contain small seeds.

== Cultivation ==
Mazus reptans is cultivated as an ornamental plant, for use as a groundcover in gardens and container gardening. Creeping mazus can quickly form a dense ground-hugging carpet of bright green foliage, with showy seasonal flowers. Its fingernail sized lance-shaped toothed leaves typically remain green throughout the growing season, and it is evergreen in hardiness zones 5–8. It spreads quickly due to the stems rooting.

The plant is best grown in moist but well-drained soil, receiving irrigation from "average" up to 30 centimetres (12 in) per year. It prefers protected full sun to half-shade locations.

Creeping mazus is used in smaller open areas, between stepping stones in paths and patios, a trailing plant in pots, and in flower beds.

It can also be used as a beneficial ground cover for grape vines (Vitis spp.), or the spring foliage of bulbs.

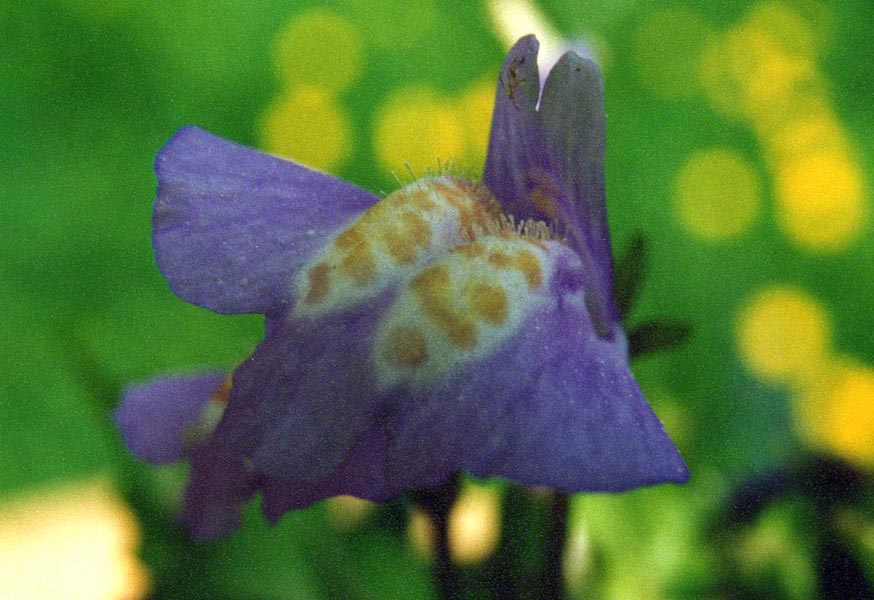

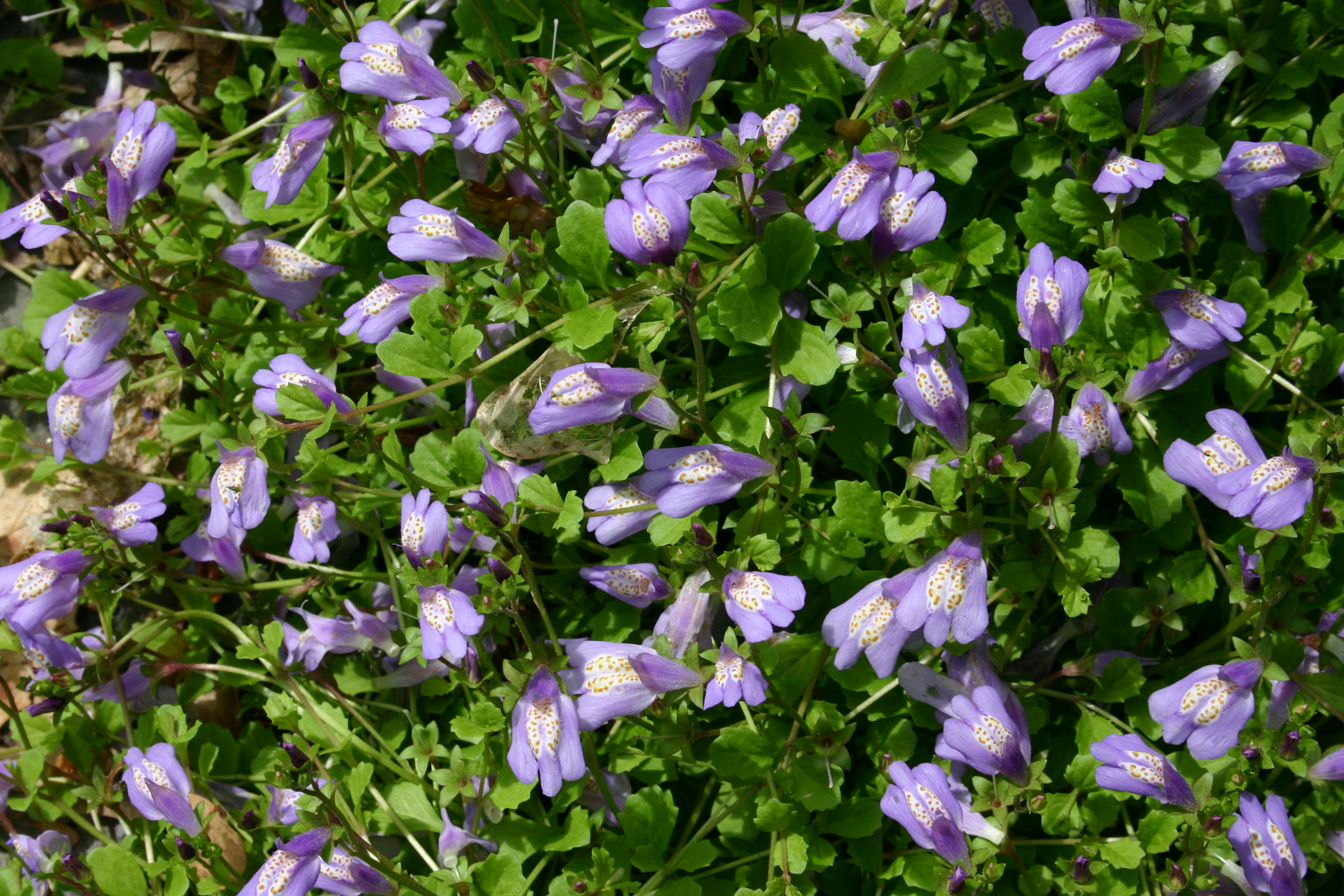
