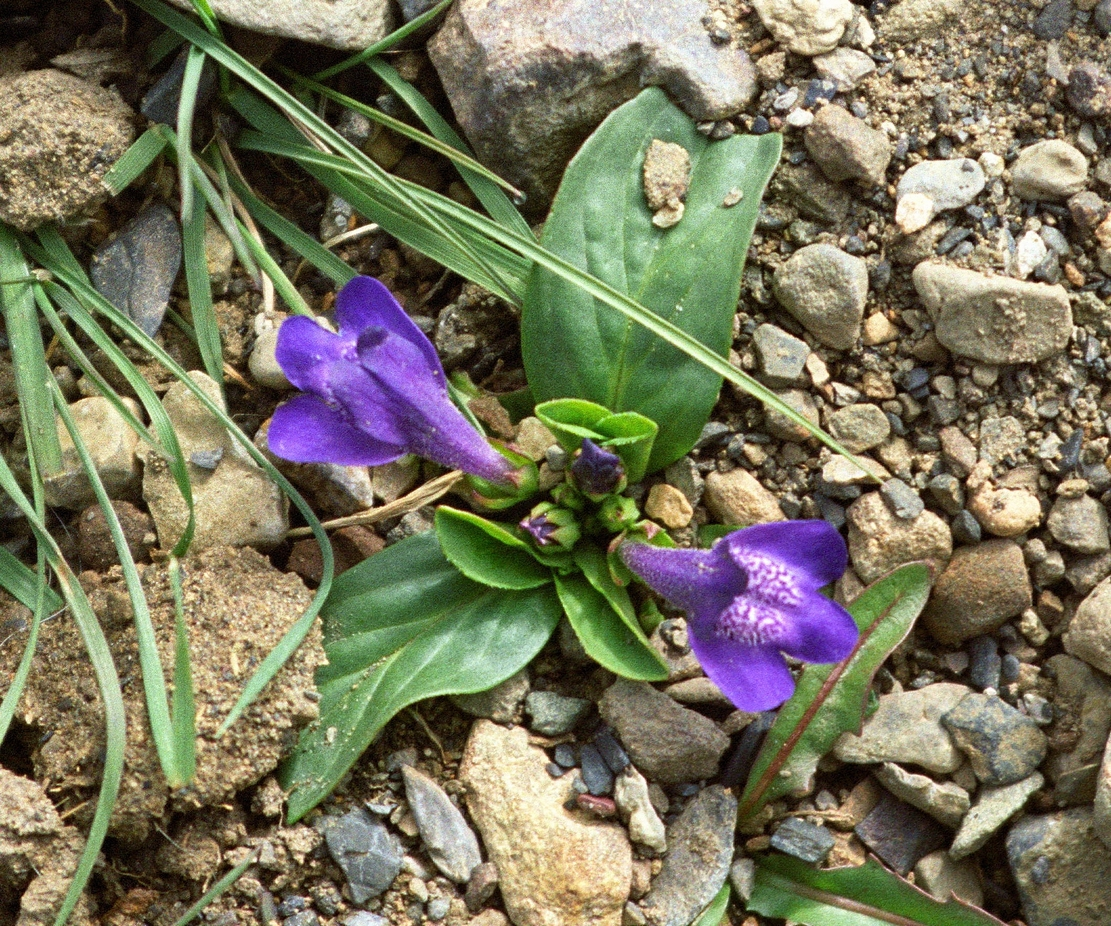

Scientific classification
- Kingdom: Plantae
- Clade: Tracheophytes
- Clade: Angiosperms
- Clade: Eudicots
- Clade: Asterids
- Order: Lamiales
- Family: Mazaceae
- Genus: Lancea
- Species: L. tibetica

Binomial name
- Lancea tibetica Hook.f. & Thomson (1857)

= Lancea tibetica =

Species of flowering plant

Lancea tibetica is a herbaceous plant of the Mazaceae family. Lancea tibetica is found in grasslands, sparse forests, along streams between the altitudes of 2000 and 4500 meters in the Gansu, Qinghai, Sichuan and Tibet Autonomous Region regions of China, Bhutan, India, Mongolia, Sikkim and Nepal.
