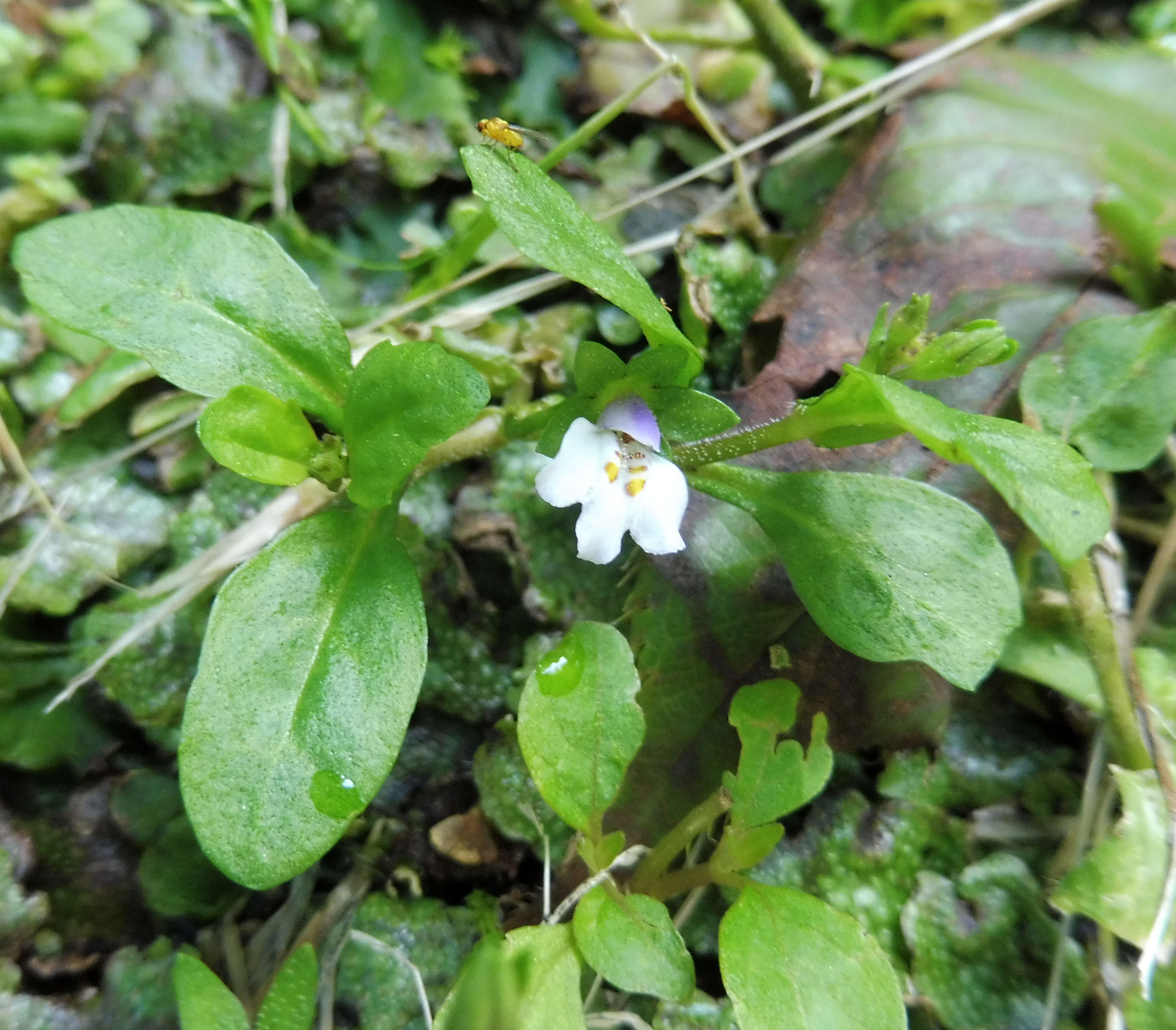

Scientific classification
- Kingdom: Plantae
- Clade: Tracheophytes
- Clade: Angiosperms
- Clade: Eudicots
- Clade: Asterids
- Order: Lamiales
- Family: Mazaceae
- Genus: Mazus
- Species: M. pumilus

Binomial name
- Mazus pumilus (Burm. f.) Steenis

= Mazus pumilus =

Species of flowering plant

Mazus pumilus, commonly called Japanese mazus, is a species of flowering plant in the Mazaceae family. It is native to south and east Asia, where it is found in Bhutan, China, India, Pakistan, Bangladesh, Indonesia, Japan, Korea, Nepal, New Guinea, the Philippines, Russia, Taiwan, Thailand, and Vietnam. It is an invasive species in North America.

Its natural habitat is wet grasslands, streambanks, and trailsides. It is tolerant of disturbance, and can be found in areas such as cultivated fields, sidewalk cracks, and waste ground. It is a very common species in Japan.

It is an upright annual growing to 30 cm tall. Its flowers are purple and white with yellow spots on the throat. Flowers are produced throughout the growing season.
