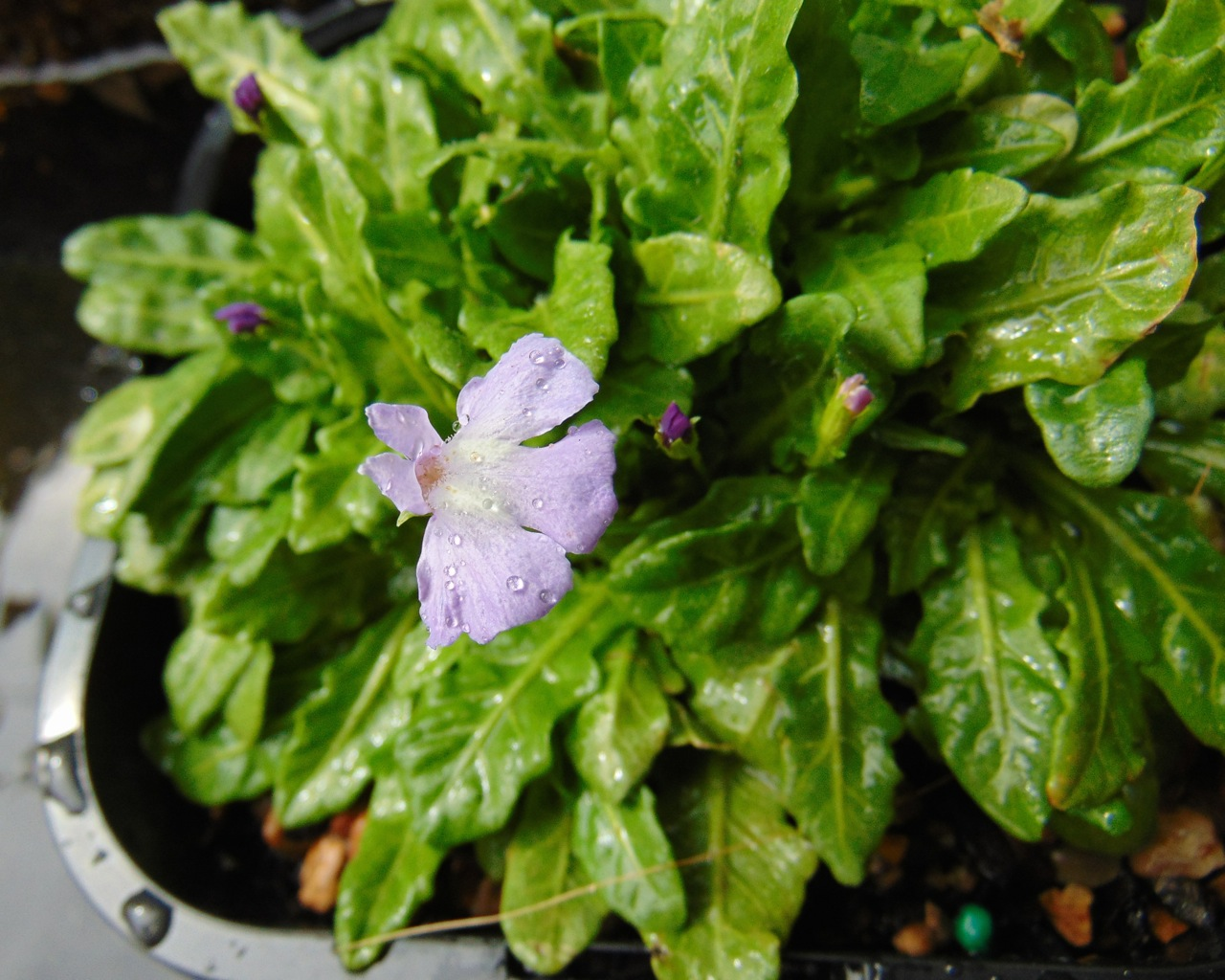

Scientific classification
- Kingdom: Plantae
- Clade: Tracheophytes
- Clade: Angiosperms
- Clade: Eudicots
- Clade: Asterids
- Order: Lamiales
- Family: Mazaceae
- Genus: Mazus
- Species: M. pumilio

Binomial name
- Mazus pumilio R.Br.

= Mazus pumilio =

Swamp mazus

Species of flowering plant

Mazus pumilio, commonly known as the swamp mazus, is a plant native to eastern Australia, Tasmania and New Zealand. It is commonly cultivated as an ornamental plant, most often for creating a groundcover. It is a completely prostrate, perennial herb usually forming wide spreading patches.
