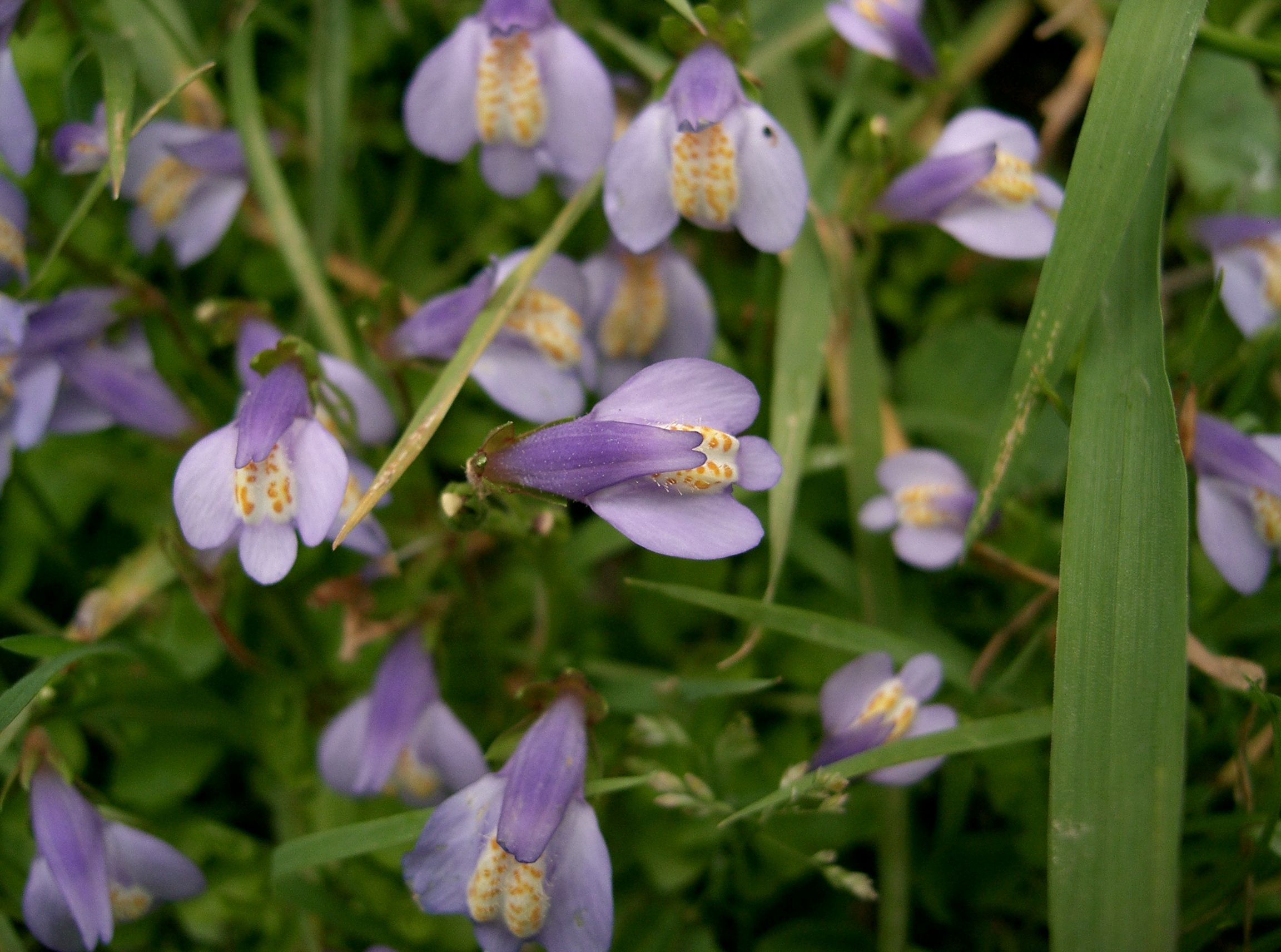

Scientific classification
- Kingdom: Plantae
- Clade: Tracheophytes
- Clade: Angiosperms
- Clade: Eudicots
- Clade: Asterids
- Order: Lamiales
- Family: Mazaceae
- Genus: Mazus
- Species: M. miquelii

Binomial name
- Mazus miquelii Makino

Synonyms
- Homotypic Synonyms: Pyxidaria japonica (Miq.) Kuntze; Vandellia japonica Miq.; Heterotypic Synonyms: Mazus englerianus Bonati; Mazus fargesii Bonati; Mazus japonicus Bonati; Mazus japonicus var. albiflorus Makino; Mazus japonicus var. leucanthus X.D.Dong & Ji H.Li; Mazus miquelii f. albiflorus (Makino) Makino; Mazus miquelii f. contractus (Makino) Sugim. ex Yamazaki; Mazus miquelii var. contractus Makino; Mazus miquelii var. rotundifolius (Franch. & Sav.) Nakai; Mazus miquelii f. rotundifolius (Franch. & Sav.) T.Yamaz.; Mazus miquelii var. stolonifer (Maxim.) Nakai; Mazus reptans N.E.Br.; Mazus rotundifolius (Franch. & Sav.) Koidz.; Mazus rotundus Furumi; Mazus rugosus var. macranthus Franch. & Sav.; Mazus rugosus var. rotundifolius Franch. & Sav.; Mazus rugosus var. stolonifer Maxim.; Mazus stolonifer (Maxim.) Makino; Mazus stolonifer f. roseus Honda; Mazus stolonifer var. taibokuensis Masam.; Mazus wilsonii Bonati

= Mazus miquelii =

Species of flowering plant

Mazus miquelii, commonly known as Miquel's mazus or creeping mazus, is a species of flowering plant in the family Mazaceae. It is an herbaceous perennial groundcover native to South Central China, Southeast China, Japan, Korea, and Taiwan. Mazus reptans is now considered a heterotypic synonym of M. miquelii, but is still often used in the ornamental plant trade.

== Description ==
Mazus miquelii spreads rapidly by producing significant amounts of slender stolons which root at the nodes. The leaves are undivided and teethed along the margins. The blue or purple flowers are bilateral and have 5 petals, The plants flower during the months of June to August. This species is hermaphroditic and is pollinated by insects.

== Habitat ==
Mazus miquelii has been introduced in North America, and as such is considered an invasive weed, especially in parts of the north-eastern United States. This species thrives in damp, bog-like conditions, and cannot tolerate dry periods.
