= Mazus gracilis =

Scientific classification
- Kingdom: Plantae
- Clade: Tracheophytes
- Clade: Angiosperms
- Clade: Eudicots
- Clade: Asterids
- Order: Lamiales
- Family: Mazaceae
- Genus: Mazus
- Species: M. gracilis

Binomial name
- Mazus gracilis Hemsl.

Species of flowering plant

Mazus gracilis is a species of flowering plant in the family Mazaceae. It is native to the Provinces of Henan, Hubei, Jiangsu, Jiangxi and Zhejiang in China. It grows on lake shores, river banks, and other moist areas at elevations below 800 m.

Mazus gracilis is a perennial herb spreading by means of stolons running along the surface of the ground for as far as 30 cm (12 inches). Leaves are up to 2.5 cm long. Flowers are born in axillary racemes. Flowers are yellow, white or purple, sometimes with spots of another color.
