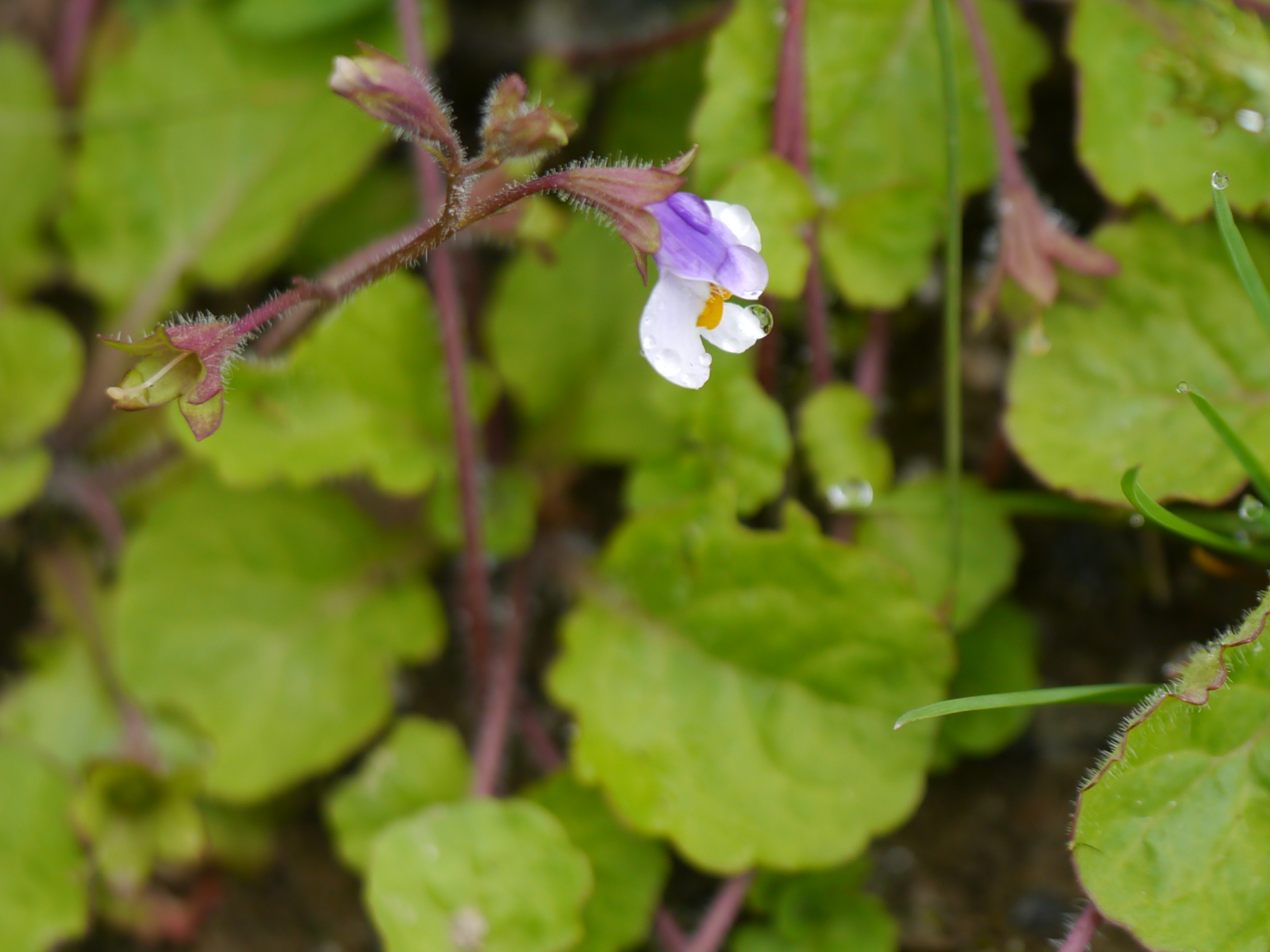

Scientific classification
- Kingdom: Plantae
- Clade: Tracheophytes
- Clade: Angiosperms
- Clade: Eudicots
- Clade: Asterids
- Order: Lamiales
- Family: Mazaceae
- Genus: Mazus
- Species: M. surculosus

Binomial name
- Mazus surculosus D.Don

= Mazus surculosus =

Species of flowering plant

Mazus surculosus, commonly known as suckering mazus, is a species of herbaceous perennial groundcover native to Bhutan, China, India, and Nepal.

== Description ==
This species can grow to 8 cm (3.1 in) tall. It spreads rapidly via stolons which root at the nodes. The obovate leaves are 2–7 cm (0.79–2.76 in) long. The blue or white flowers are 4–8 mm (0.16–0.31 in) long and appear between the months of June and July. The smooth seeds are stored within an ovoid capsule.

== Habitat ==
This species is found at high altitudes within the Himalayas mountain range. It is found between altitudes of 2000–3000 metres. It is often found in grassy areas nearby forests.
