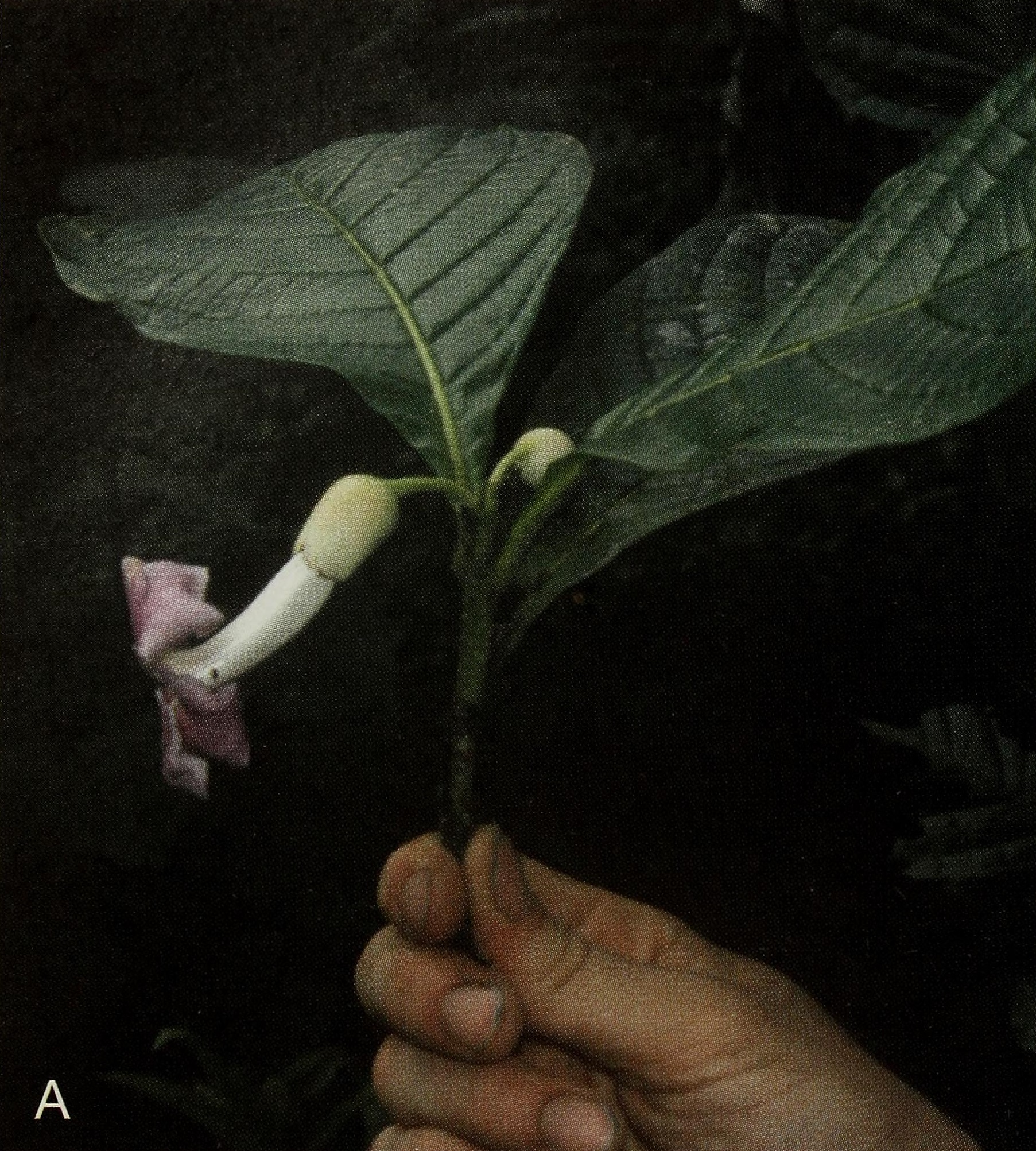

Scientific classification
- Kingdom: Plantae
- Clade: Tracheophytes
- Clade: Angiosperms
- Clade: Eudicots
- Clade: Asterids
- Order: Lamiales
- Family: Schlegeliaceae
- Genus: Exarata; A.H.Gentry
- Species: E. chocoensis

Binomial name
- Exarata chocoensis A.H.Gentry

= Exarata =

Genus of flowering plants

Exarata is a group of plants described as a genus in 1992.

Exarata contains only one known species, Exarata chocoensis, native to the Pacific coastal regions of Colombia and Ecuador.
