= Puchiumazus =

Scientific classification
- Kingdom: Plantae
- Clade: Tracheophytes
- Clade: Angiosperms
- Clade: Eudicots
- Clade: Asterids
- Order: Lamiales
- Family: Mazaceae
- Genus: Puchiumazus; Bo Li, D.G.Zhang & C.L.Xiang (2021)
- Species: P. lanceifolius

Binomial name
- Puchiumazus lanceifolius (Hemsl.) Bo Li, D.G.Zhang & C.L.Xiang (2021)

Synonyms
- Mazus lanceifolius Hemsl. (1890)

Genus of flowering plants

Puchiumazus lanceifolius is a species of flowering plant in family Mazaceae. It is a perennial native to eastern Sichuan and western Hubei provinces of south-central China. It is the sole species in genus Puchiumazus.

The species was first described as Mazus lanceifolius by William Hemsley in 1890. It was renamed Puchiumazus lanceifolius in 2021, and placed in its own genus.
