= Thomandersia laurifolia =

Conservation status
- Least Concern (IUCN 3.1)

Scientific classification
- Kingdom: Plantae
- Clade: Tracheophytes
- Clade: Angiosperms
- Clade: Eudicots
- Clade: Asterids
- Order: Lamiales
- Family: Thomandersiaceae
- Genus: Thomandersia
- Species: T. laurifolia

Binomial name
- Thomandersia laurifolia T.Anderson ex Baill.

Species of shrub

Thomandersia laurifolia is a small tree or shrub native to Central Africa. Some residents where the tree grows use the leaves of the plant for antiparasitic properties and to relieve fevers. The western lowland gorilla (Gorilla gorilla gorilla) is known to eat the leaves of the plant, possibly also for pharmaceutical purposes, as the leaves are bitter.
