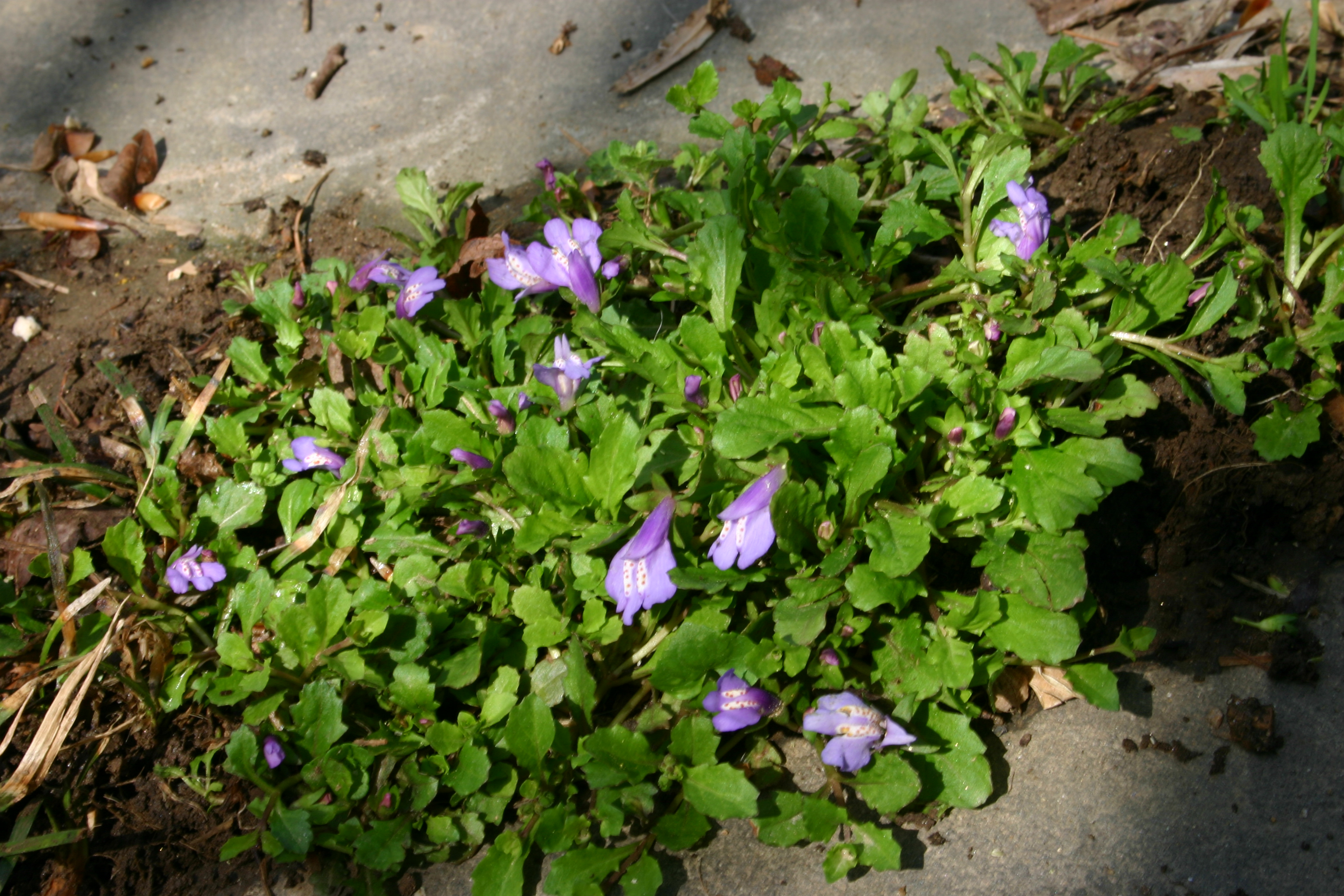
- Mazus reptans

Scientific classification
- Kingdom: Plantae
- Clade: Tracheophytes
- Clade: Angiosperms
- Clade: Eudicots
- Clade: Asterids
- Order: Lamiales
- Family: Mazaceae
- Genus: Mazus; Lour.

Synonyms
- Hornemannia Willd.; Trevirania Roth

= Mazus =

Genus of flowering plants

Mazus is a genus of low-growing perennial plants. It has been placed in various plant families including Phrymaceae, Scrophulariaceae, and recently in the family Mazaceae. Consisting of around 40 species, this genus is generally found in damp habitats in lowland or mountain regions of China, Japan, India, Southeast Asia, Australia and New Zealand.

40 species are accepted:

- Mazus alpinus Masam.
- Mazus arenarius Heenan, P.N.Johnson & C.J.Webb
- Mazus caducifer Hance
- Mazus celsioides Hand.-Mazz.
- Mazus danxiacola Bo Li & B.Chen
- Mazus delavayi Bonati
- Mazus dentatus Wall. ex Benth.
- Mazus fauriei Bonati
- Mazus fruticosus Bo Li, D.G.Zhang & C.L.Xiang
- Mazus fukienensis P.C.Tsoong
- Mazus gracilis Hemsl.
- Mazus harmandii Banati
- Mazus henryi P.C.Tsoong
- Mazus humilis Hand.-Mazz.
- Mazus kweichowensis P.C.Tsoong & H.P.Yang
- Mazus lalashanensis S.S.Ying
- Mazus lecomtei Bonati
- Mazus longipes Bonati
- Mazus miquelii Makino — Miquel's mazus
- Mazus novaezeelandiae W.R.Barker
- Mazus oliganthus H.L.Li
- Mazus omeiensis H.L.Li
- Mazus procumbens Hemsl.
- Mazus pulchellus Hemsl.
- Mazus pumilio R.Br. — Swamp mazus
- Mazus pumilus (Burm.f.) Steenis — Japanese mazus
- Mazus quadriprotuberans N.Yonez.
- Mazus radicans (Hook.f.) Cheeseman — Swamp musk
- Mazus reptans N.E.Br. (synonym of M. miquelii) — Creeping mazus
- Mazus rockii H.L.Li
- Mazus saltuarius Hand.-Mazz.
- Mazus solanifolius P.C.Tsoong & H.P.Yang
- Mazus somggangensis S.S.Ying
- Mazus spicatus Vaniot
- Mazus stachydifolius (Turcz.) Maxim.
- Mazus sunhangii D.G.Zhang & T.Deng
- Mazus surculosus D.Don — Suckering mazus
- Mazus tainanensis T.H.Hsieh
- Mazus uniflorus S.S.Ying
- Mazus wanmuliensis M.Qian & L.B.Geng
- Mazus xiuningensis X.H.Guo & X.L.Liu
