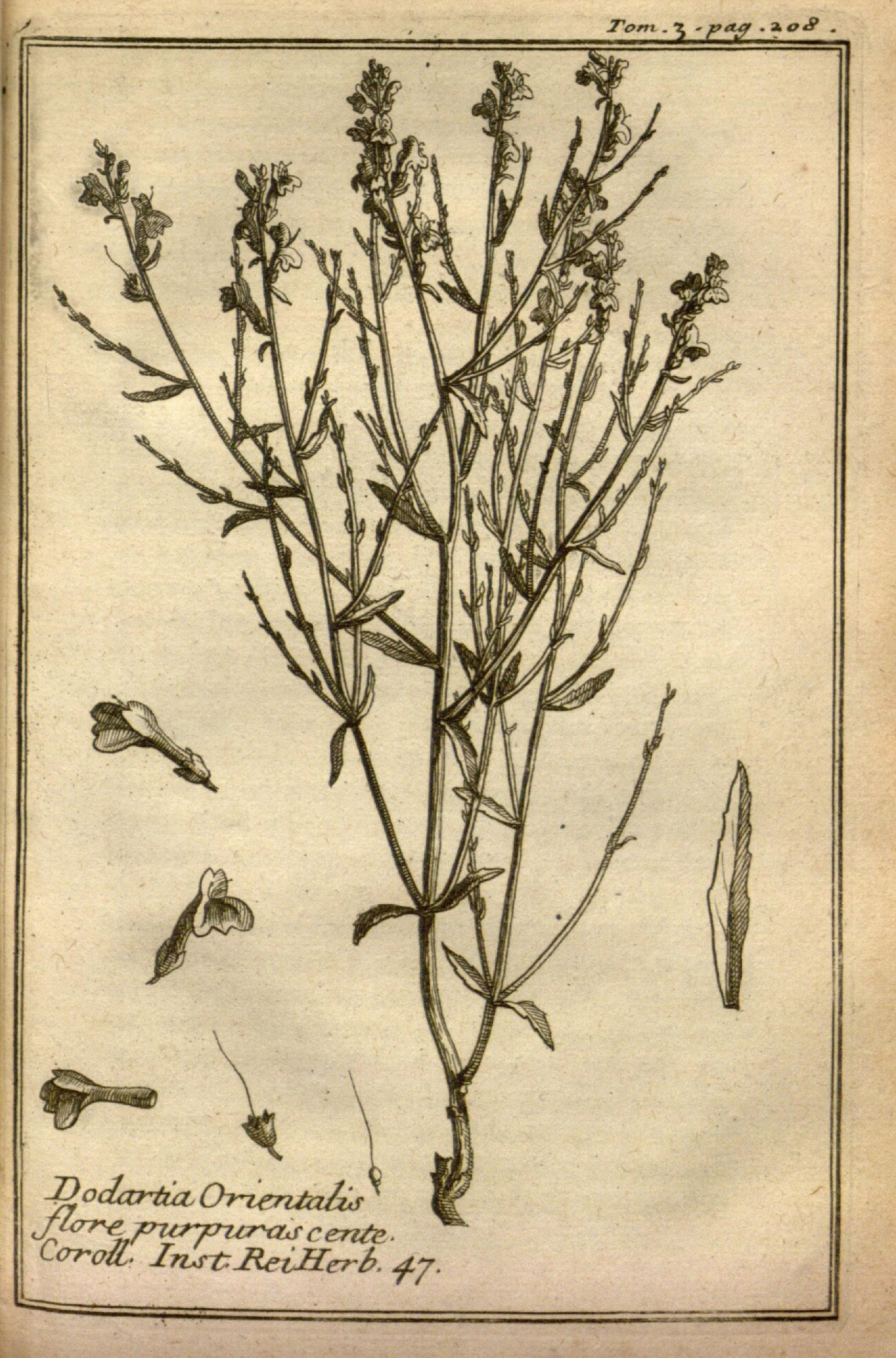
- Dodartia orientalis botanical illustration

Scientific classification
- Kingdom: Plantae
- Clade: Tracheophytes
- Clade: Angiosperms
- Clade: Eudicots
- Clade: Asterids
- Order: Lamiales
- Family: Mazaceae
- Genus: Dodartia; Tourn. ex L.
- Species: D. orientalis

Binomial name
- Dodartia orientalis L.

= Dodartia =

Genus of Mazaceae plants

Dodartia is a genus of flowering plants in the family Mazaceae. It has only one currently accepted species, Dodartia orientalis, native to Ukraine, Russia, Anatolia, the Caucasus, Central Asia, Iran, Afghanistan, Pakistan, the Altai, northern China and Mongolia. A weedy perennial, it is eaten by saiga antelope.
