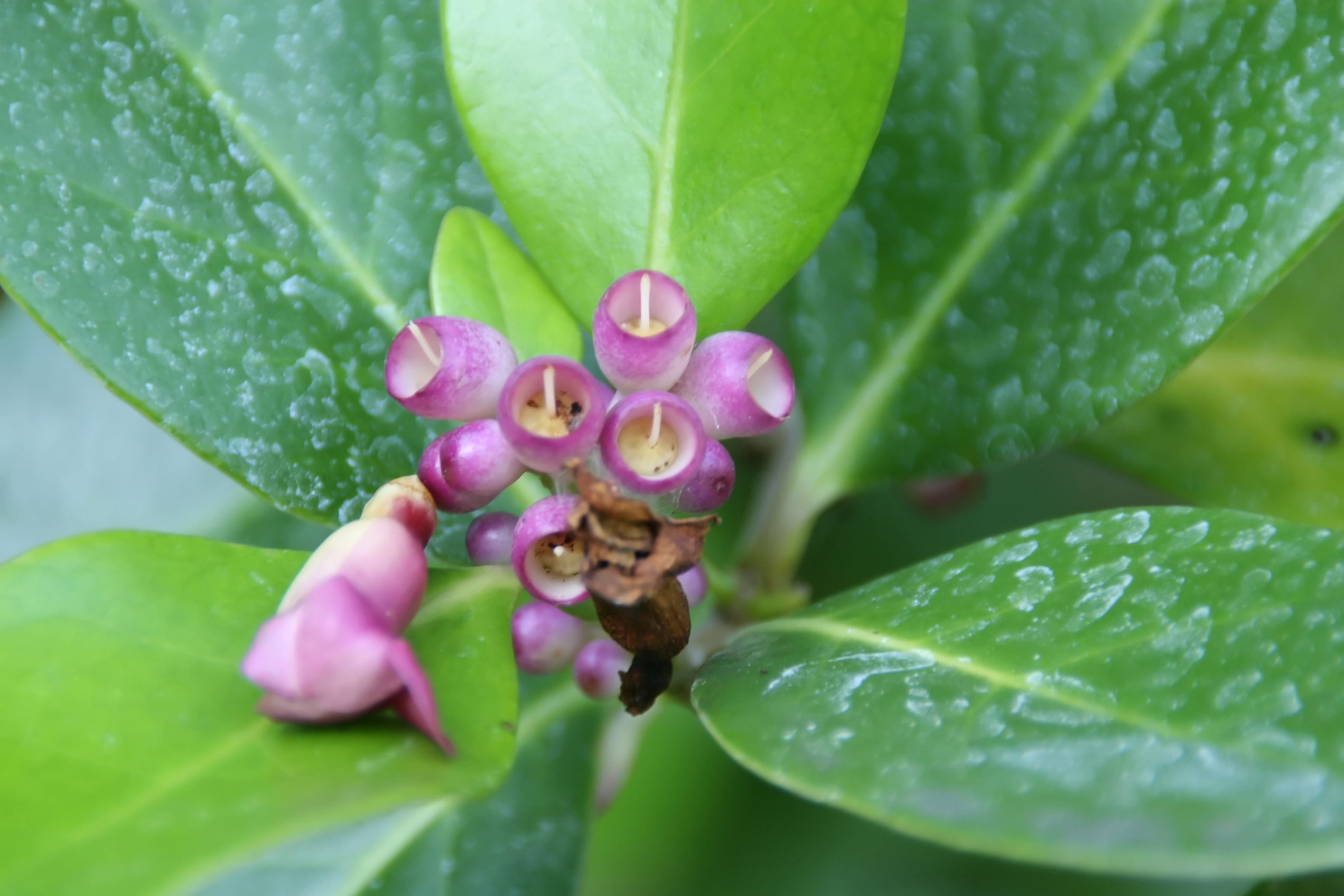
- Schlegelia parasitica flowers

Scientific classification
- Kingdom: Plantae
- Clade: Tracheophytes
- Clade: Angiosperms
- Clade: Eudicots
- Clade: Asterids
- Order: Lamiales
- Family: Schlegeliaceae
- Genus: Schlegelia; Miq.

= Schlegelia =

Genus of plants

Schlegelia is a group of plants described as a genus in 1844. The genus is named after the German anatomist and physician Paul Marquard Schlegel.

Schlegelia is native to tropical parts of the Western Hemisphere from southern Mexico and the West Indies to southern Brazil.

Species

1. Schlegelia aurea - Brazil (Amazonas)
2. Schlegelia axillaris - Jamaica, Lesser Antilles
3. Schlegelia brachyantha - Greater Antilles, Venezuela, Costa Rica, Panama
4. Schlegelia cauliflora - Loreto
5. Schlegelia chocoensis - Colombia, Ecuador
6. Schlegelia darienensis - Colombia, Ecuador
7. Schlegelia dressleri - Panama, Ecuador
8. Schlegelia fastigiata - Colombia, Ecuador, Central America
9. Schlegelia fuscata - Colombia, Ecuador, Central America, French Guiana
10. Schlegelia hirsuta - Colombia
11. Schlegelia macrocarpa - Guatemala
12. Schlegelia macrophylla - French Guiana, Peru
13. Schlegelia monachinoi - Colombia, Ecuador, Venezuela
14. Schlegelia nicaraguensis - Central America, Veracruz
15. Schlegelia pandurata - Colombia, Ecuador
16. Schlegelia paraensis - French Guiana, Suriname, Pará
17. Schlegelia parasitica - Jamaica
18. Schlegelia parviflora - from Belize to S Brazil
19. Schlegelia roseiflora - French Guiana, Peru
20. Schlegelia scandens - northern South America
21. Schlegelia spruceana - Guyana, Venezuela, N Brazil
22. Schlegelia sulphurea - Colombia, Ecuador
23. Schlegelia violacea - northern South America
