= Rennsteiggarten Oberhof =

German botanical garden

Coordinates: 50°41′38″N 10°43′14″E

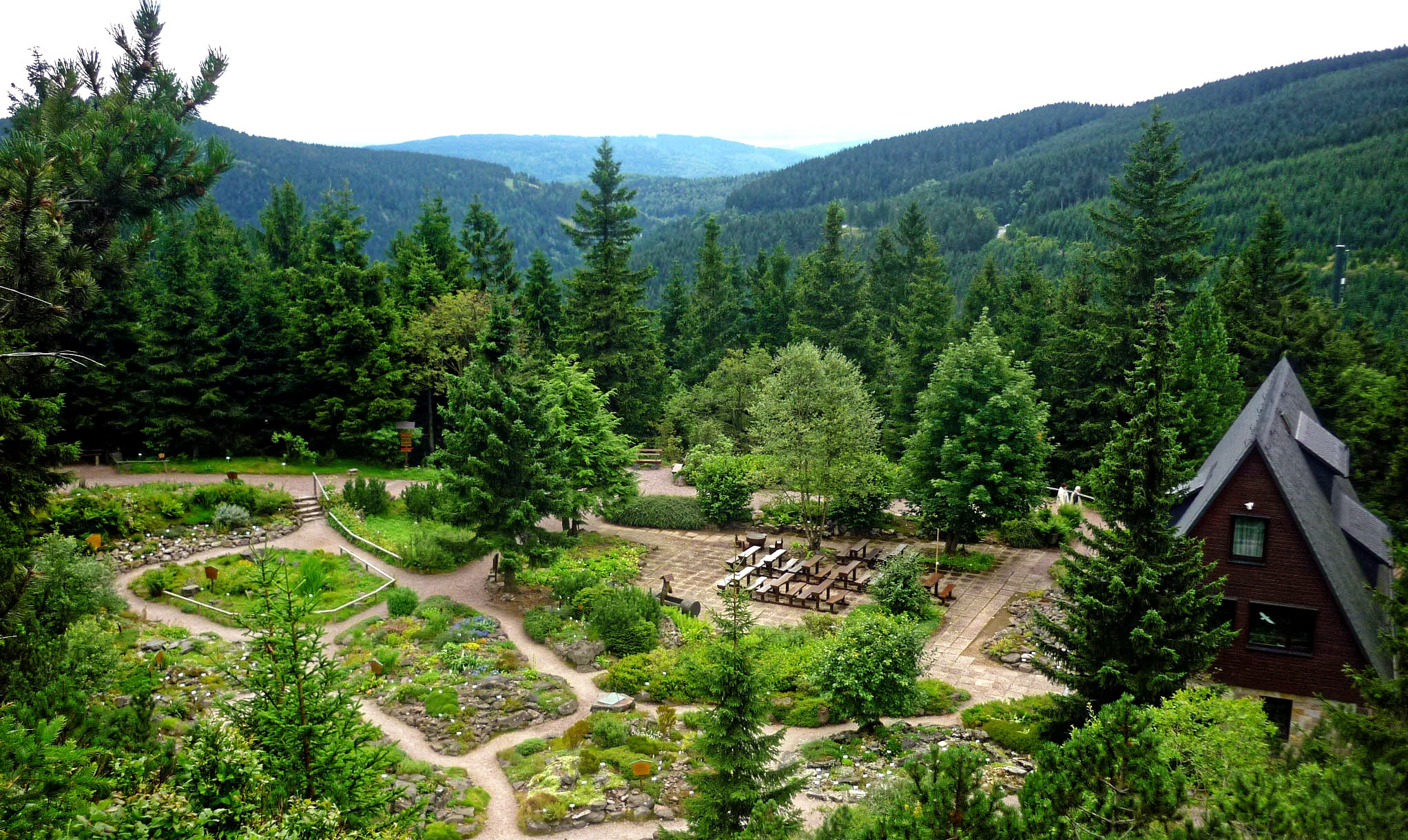

The Rennsteiggarten Oberhof (7 hectares) is a botanical garden specializing in mountain flora, located in Rennsteig at Am Pfanntalskopf 3, Oberhof, Thuringia, Germany. It is open daily in the warmer months; an admission fee is charged.

The garden was established in 1970 on the grounds of a former quarry at an elevation of 868 meters on the Pfanntalskopf. In 1972, the Cultural Federation and University of Jena agreed to scientific support, and plantings began with material from the Botanischer Garten Jena. In 1980 an indigenous plant bog was created, with a nature garden begun in 1985 for protected plants from the Thuringian mountains, and in 1993 a garden of Thuringian herbs.

== Species ==
The garden contains about 4,000 species from the mountains of Europe, Asia, North and South America, New Zealand, and the Arctic, with a special focus on protected species of Thuringia.

Specimens of interest include:

- Acinos alpinus
- Adonis vernalis
- Androsace carnea
- Androsace helvetica
- Aquilegia formosa
- Arctostaphylos alpina
- Calceolaria darwinii
- Callianthemum anemonoides
- Caltha howellii
- Campanula barbata
- Cornus canadensis
- Cypripedium calceolus
- Daphne arbuscula
- Daphne blagayana
- Dianthus glacialis
- Eryngium alpinum
- Fritillaria meleagris
- Gentiana asclepiadea
- Gentiana lutea
- Gentiana occidentalis
- Gentiana verna
- Globularia cordifolia
- Helichrysum bellidioides
- Incarvillea mairei
- Lilium bulbiferum
- Lilium carniolicum
- Lilium oxypetalum
- Meconopsis integrifolia
- Ramonda nathaliae
- Rhododendron camtschaticum
- Rhododendron ferrugineum
- Salix hylematica
- Soldanella alpina
- Teucrium montanum
- Thalictrum aquilegiifolium
- Thymus doerfleri
- Tulipa montana

== See also ==
- List of botanical gardens in Germany
