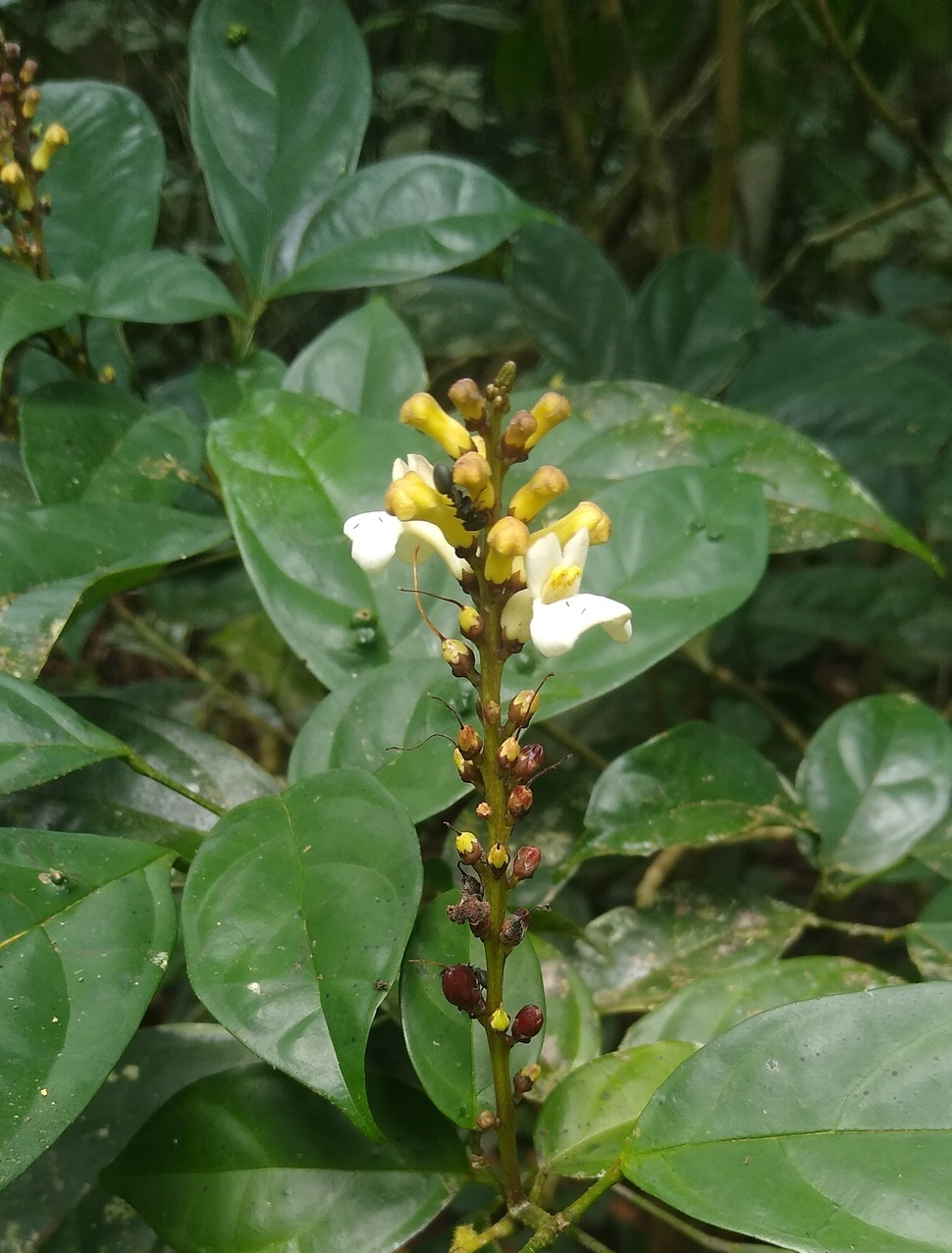
- Thomandersia hensii

Scientific classification
- Kingdom: Plantae
- Clade: Tracheophytes
- Clade: Angiosperms
- Clade: Eudicots
- Clade: Asterids
- Order: Lamiales
- Family: Thomandersiaceae; Sreem.
- Genus: Thomandersia; Baill.

Species
- See text

Synonyms
- Scytanthus T. Anderson ex Benth. & Hook.f., illeg. homonym, 1876 not Hook. 1844, Apocynaceae nor Liebm. 1847, Rafflesiaceae

= Thomandersia =

Genus of flowering plants

Thomandersia is the sole genus in the Thomandersiaceae, an African family of flowering plants. Thomandersia is a genus of shrubs and small trees, with six species native to Central and West Africa.

Thomandersia traditionally has been classified within the family Acanthaceae based on morphology by several authors, including APG I 1998, APG II 2003, and in Schlegeliaceae at APG Website Missouri Botanical Garden, in a list of genera of this family, but Stevens argues further that should be considered out of this taxon by weak support and regarded Thomandersiaceae.

The genus was elevated to family status, previously by Sreemadhavan 1976 and 1977 on the basis of leaf anatomy and anther morphology, and more recently by Wortley et al. 2005 and 2007, based on phylogenetic analyses of genetic material.

The genus was described with this name in 1892 by French botanist Henri Ernest Baillon.

== Species ==
The genus includes the following species:

- Thomandersia anachoreta Heine - Liberia, Ivory Coast
- Thomandersia butayei De Wild. - Republic of the Congo, Gabon, Democratic Republic of the Congo
- Thomandersia congolana De Wild. & T. Durand - Republic of the Congo, Democratic Republic of the Congo, Cameroon, Equatorial Guinea
- Thomandersia hensii De Wild. & T. Durand - from Nigeria to Angola
- Thomandersia laurentii De Wild. - Republic of the Congo, Democratic Republic of the Congo
- Thomandersia laurifolia (T. Anderson ex Benth.) Baill. - Nigeria, Republic of the Congo, Democratic Republic of the Congo, Cameroon, Equatorial Guinea
