= Synapsis ilicifolia =

Conservation status
- Endangered (IUCN 2.3)

Scientific classification
- Kingdom: Plantae
- Clade: Tracheophytes
- Clade: Angiosperms
- Clade: Eudicots
- Clade: Asterids
- Order: Lamiales
- Family: Schlegeliaceae
- Genus: Synapsis; Griseb.
- Species: S. ilicifolia

Binomial name
- Synapsis ilicifolia Griseb.

Species of flowering plant

Synapsis ilicifolia is a species of plant in the family Schlegeliaceae. It is endemic to the island of Cuba. It is the sole species in the genus Synapsis, which was described as a genus in 1866.
