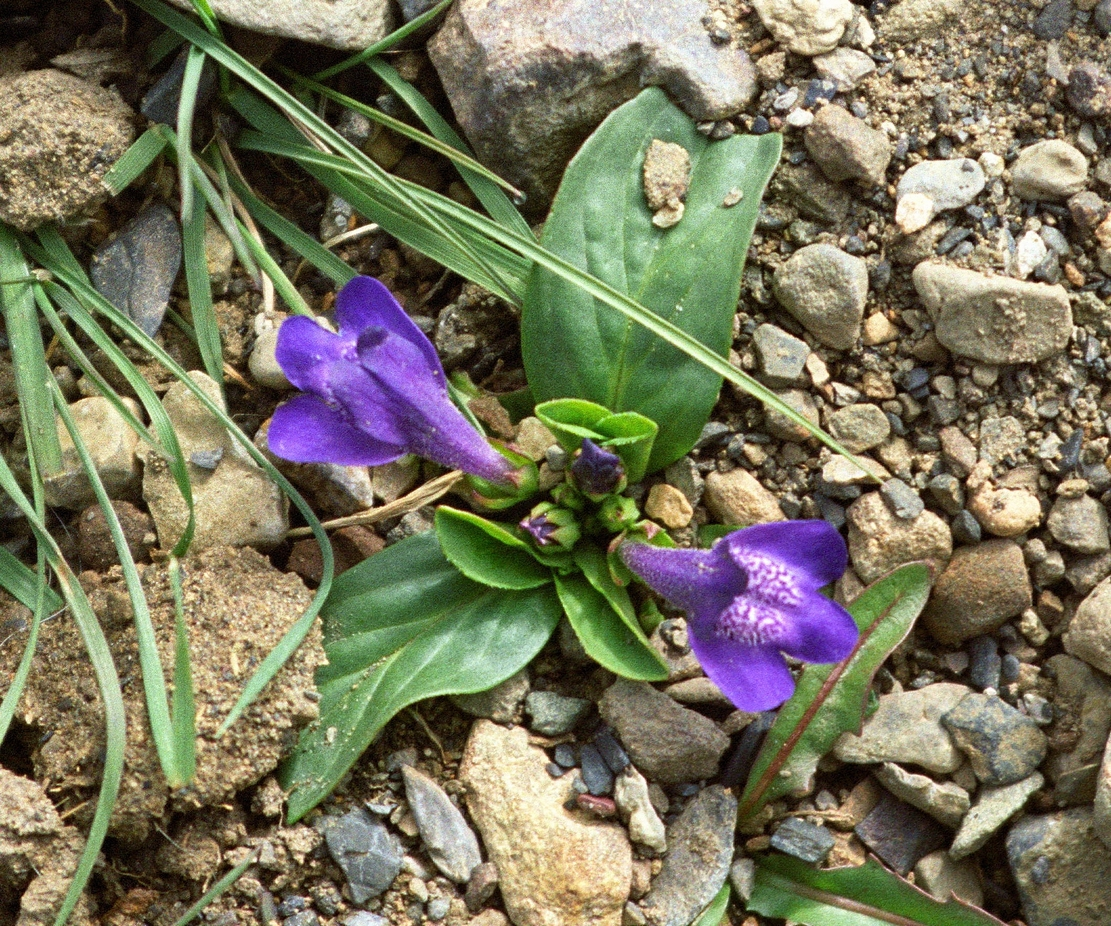

Scientific classification
- Kingdom: Plantae
- Clade: Tracheophytes
- Clade: Angiosperms
- Clade: Eudicots
- Clade: Asterids
- Order: Lamiales
- Family: Mazaceae
- Genus: Lancea; Hook.f. & Thomson (1857)

= Lancea (plant) =

Genus of flowering plants

Lancea is a plant genus in the recently described Mazaceae. It had formerly been tentatively included in the lopseed family, Phrymaceae as well as the Scrophulariaceae.

== Species ==
Lancea species include:

- Lancea tibetica Hook.f. & Thomson (1857)
- Lancea hirsuta Bonati (1909)
