= Gibsoniothamnus =

Scientific classification
- Kingdom: Plantae
- Clade: Tracheophytes
- Clade: Angiosperms
- Clade: Eudicots
- Clade: Asterids
- Order: Lamiales
- Family: Schlegeliaceae
- Genus: Gibsoniothamnus; L.O.Williams

Genus of flowering plants

Gibsoniothamnus is a group of plants described as a genus in 1970.

Gibsoniothamnus is native to southern Mexico, Central America, and Colombia.

Species

1. Gibsoniothamnus alatus - Panama, N Colombia
2. Gibsoniothamnus allenii - Panama, Costa Rica
3. Gibsoniothamnus cornutus - Veracruz, Chiapas, Guatemala
4. Gibsoniothamnus epiphyticus - Panama, Costa Rica
5. Gibsoniothamnus ficticius - Costa Rica
6. Gibsoniothamnus grandiflorus - Panama
7. Gibsoniothamnus latidentatus - Panama
8. Gibsoniothamnus mirificus - Panama
9. Gibsoniothamnus parvifolius - Panama, Costa Rica
10. Gibsoniothamnus stellatus - Panama
11. Gibsoniothamnus truncatus - Panama
12. Gibsoniothamnus versicolor - Panama
