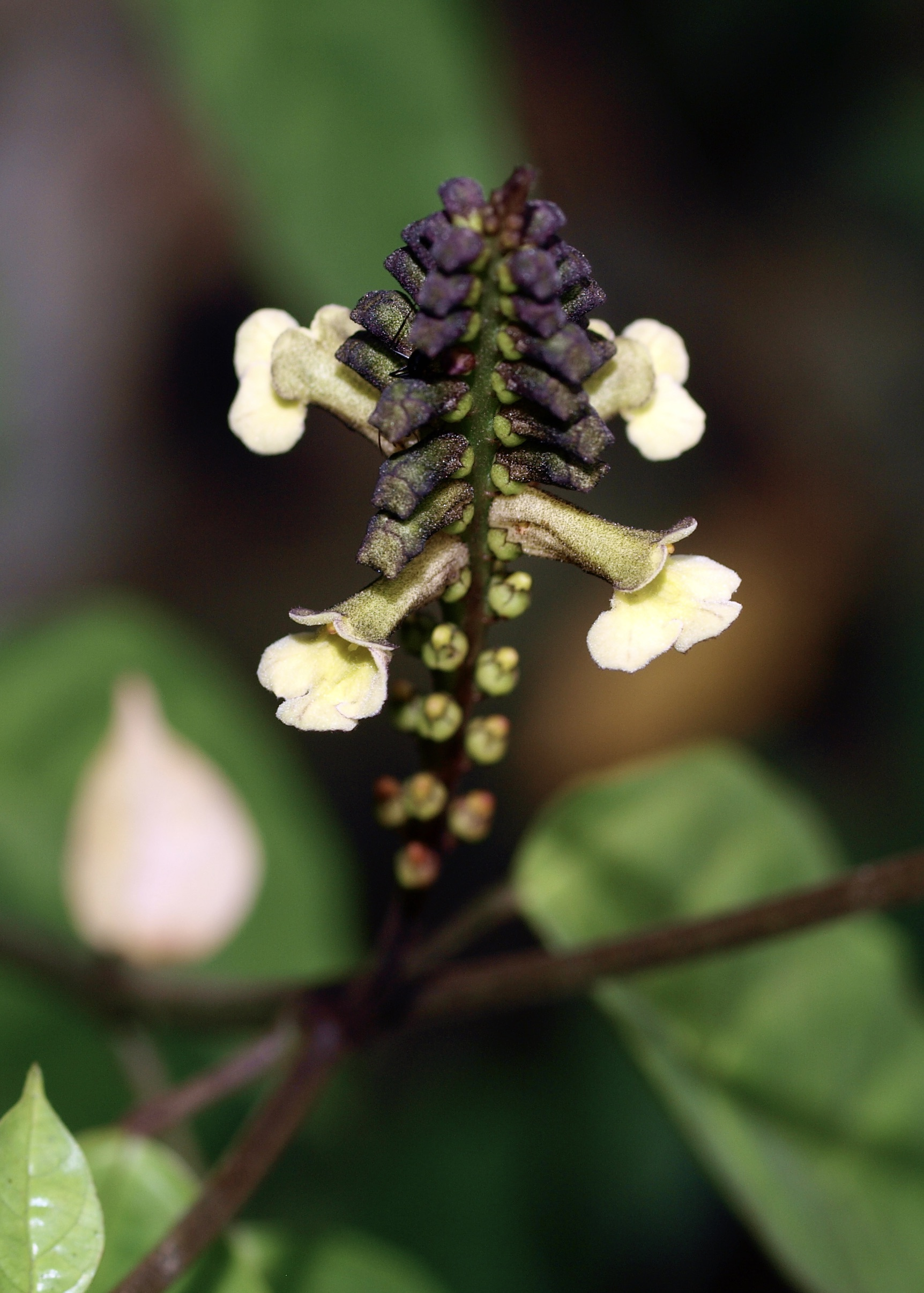

Scientific classification
- Kingdom: Plantae
- Clade: Tracheophytes
- Clade: Angiosperms
- Clade: Eudicots
- Clade: Asterids
- Order: Lamiales
- Family: Thomandersiaceae
- Genus: Thomandersia
- Species: T. anachoreta

Binomial name
- Thomandersia anachoreta Heine

= Thomandersia anachoreta =

Species of shrub

Thomandersia anachoreta is a small tree or shrub native to tropical rain forest of southwestern Côte d'Ivoire.

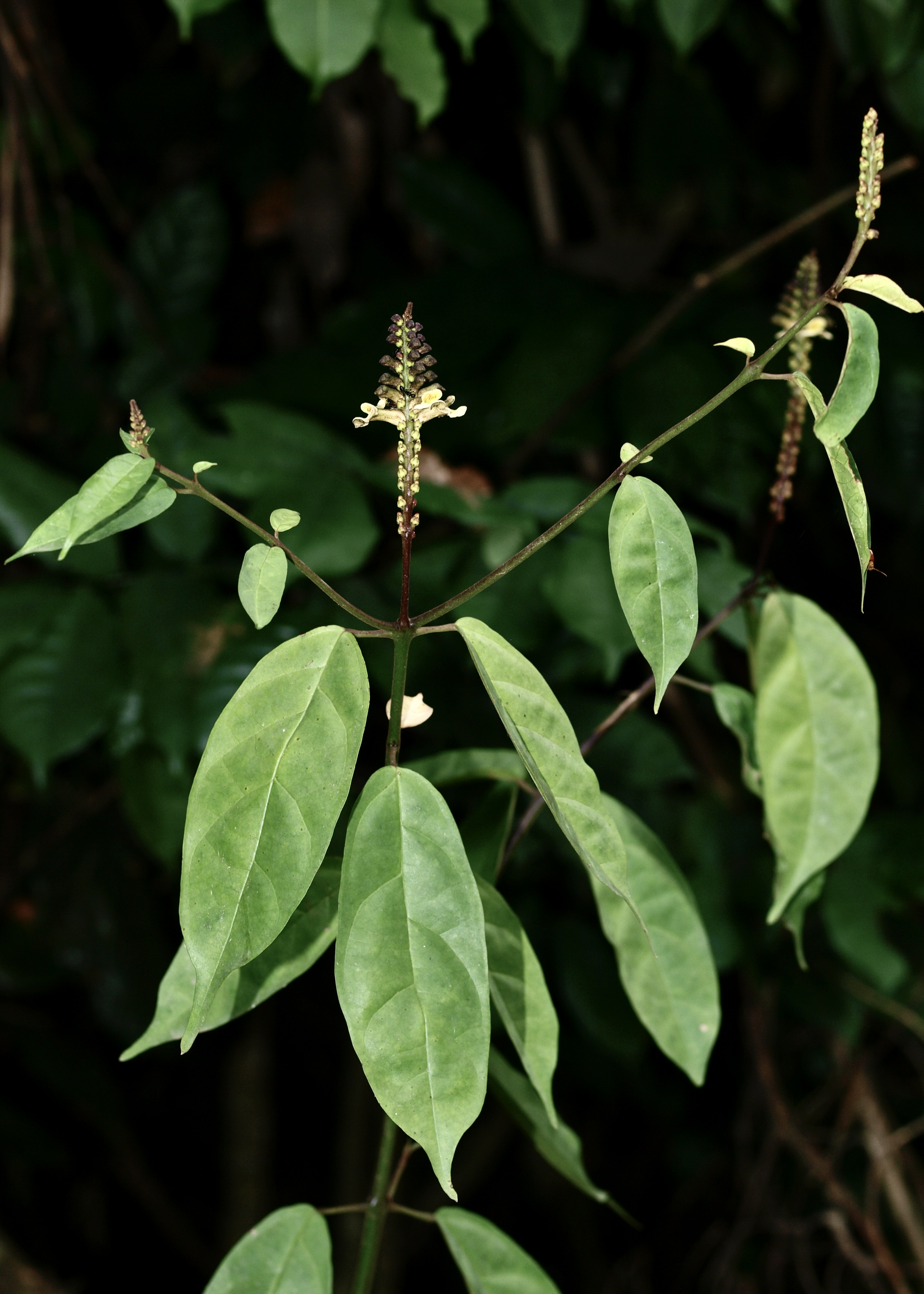
Thomandersia anachoreta. Côte d'Ivoire
