= Trulli =

Trulli may refer to:

- The plural of trullo, a traditional Apulian stone dwelling with a conical roof
- Enzo Trulli (born 2005), Italian racing driver, son of Jarno
- Giovanni Trulli (1599–1661), Italian surgeon
- Jarno Trulli (born 1974), Formula One driver, father of Enzo
  - Trulli Formula E Team team. founded by Jarno Trulli
  - A type of Kart chassis named after Jarno Trulli
- Trulli Tales, a 2017 French-Italian animated series.
