= Botanischer Garten Jena =

Botanical garden in Germany

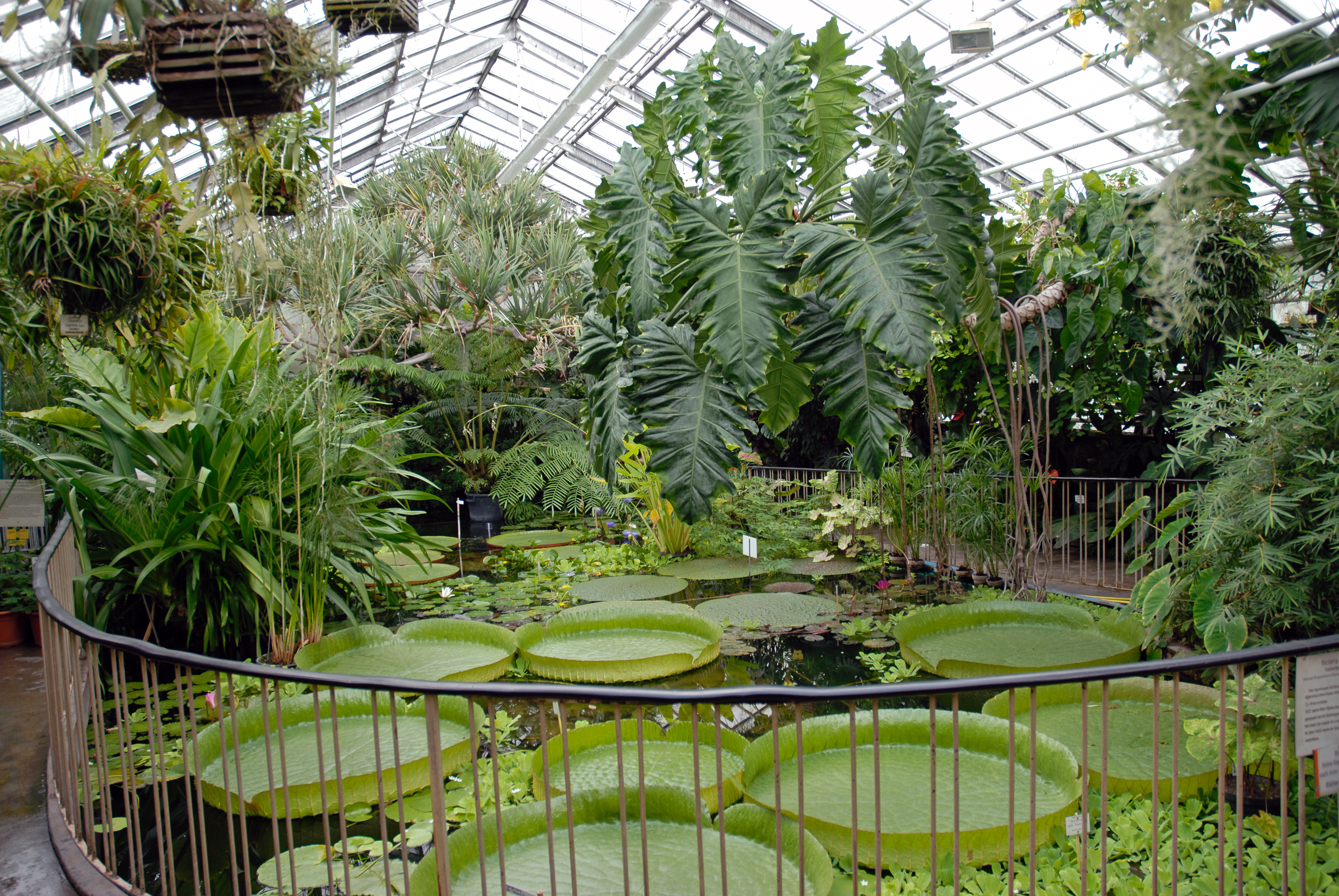
- Victoria cruziana in the tropical aquatic house
- Interactive map of Botanischer Garten Jena
- Type: Botanical
- Location: Jena, Thuringia, Germany
- Coordinates: 50°55′52″N 11°35′10″E
- Opened: 1586
- Operator: University of Jena
- Species: ~12,000
- Website: www.botanischergarten.uni-jena.de

The Botanischer Garten Jena (4.5 hectares) is the second oldest botanical garden in Germany, maintained by the University of Jena and located at Fürstengraben 26, Jena, Thuringia, Germany. It is open daily; an admission fee is charged.

The garden was first established in 1586 as a hortus medicus, six years after the establishment of the Botanical Garden in Leipzig in 1580. In 1630 it was rearranged and expanded significantly by Professor Werner Rolfinck who had previously studied at the Orto botanico di Padova (founded 1545). In 1640 a second section (1.3 hectares in area, north of the city walls) was donated, and a catalog from 1659 documents over 1300 plants in the two gardens. In 1662 the original garden was expanded, with the first heated greenhouse added in 1674, at which time the garden first began to maintain a collection of tropical plants.

In 1770 the garden introduced Linnean taxonomy, and in 1776 Goethe began his association with the garden and helped organize the Jena Institute of botany; over subsequent decades he often studied botany and wrote poems in the garden. Although the garden area was only 1.3 hectares at this time, purchases recorded in 1794 include Buxus sempervirens, Juniperus sabina, Periploca graeca, Sambucus racemosa, and Thuja occidentalis. Several years later, additional purchases included amaryllis, cacti, succulent Euphorbia, Pelargonium, and Zantedeschia. The garden's first published catalog issued in 1795.

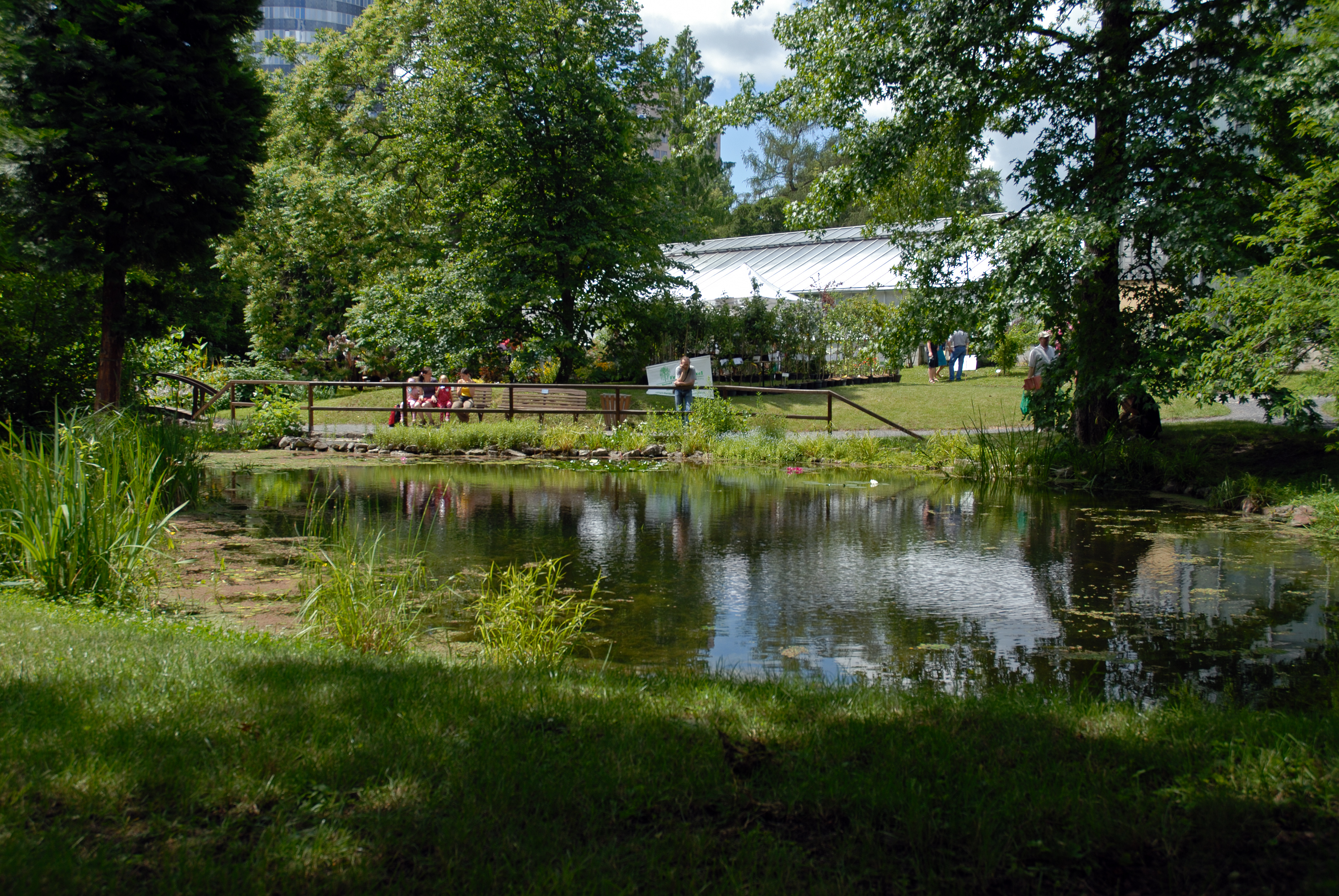
Botanischer Garten Jena

Unfortunately, the garden was severely damaged in 1806 in the Napoleonic Battle of Jena-Auerstedt, and its recovery was long and slow. By 1819 the garden contained only some 50 potted plants in one greenhouse and approximately 200 outdoor plants. However, in 1820 an additional greenhouse was constructed, and the existing greenhouses reorganized to become an orangery, palm house, and cold house. The garden was thoroughly reworked between 1877 and 1879, after which it contained 2020 species from 85 families as well as a medicinal garden and 13 groups of potted plants from geographically distinct regions. As of 1966 this number had grown substantially to about 2000 families, to which were added a further 300 families (more than 3000 species) in a new alpine plant collection.

Today the garden contains about 12,000 plants. Its outdoor areas include an arboretum containing about 900 species of deciduous and coniferous trees and shrubs; an alpine garden representing approximately 2,500 species; a systematic garden organized by contemporary taxonomy; a collection of medicinal and useful plants; a small hill and pond; and a collection of rhododendrons, roses, and dahlias. Its five greenhouses are as follows: cactus and succulent house; cold house for the transitional zone between tropics and subtropics; palm and tropical house; "evolution" house with ancient plant forms including cycads and tree ferns; and a tropical aquatic house which contains Victoria cruziana, mangroves, epiphytes, etc.

== See also ==
- Rennsteiggarten Oberhof
- List of botanical gardens in Germany
