= Giovanni Trulli =

Giovanni Trulli, latinized as Ioannes Trullius Verulanus (20 March 1599 – 27 December 1661), was an Italian surgeon, best known for examining Galileo's blindness. He taught surgery at the La Sapienza and worked at the Santo Spirito Hospital.

Trulli was born in Veroli where his father's name is recorded as Leonardo while a brother Stefano was also a physician whose son was also named Giovanni Trulli and worked in Sapienza as a lecturer of surgery. Trulli's education was in France and gained a reputation for lithotomy. He went to Rome where offered free surgery to the poor and the rent for his house was paid by Cardinal Francesco Barberini. He was also physician to Pope Urban VIII who he helped embalm after death, noting also gallstones and calcification of the left ventricle. He later served as physician for Pope Alexander VII. He may have been a contact between William Harvey and Francesco Barberini in 1636. Along with Paul Marquard Schlegel he made public demonstrations and openly defended the concept of blood circulation in 1651. Trulli was involved in several post mortems including those of Cardinals Orazio Giustiniani and Cornelio Melzi.
