= Werner Rolfinck =

German physician, scientist and botanist (1599–1673)

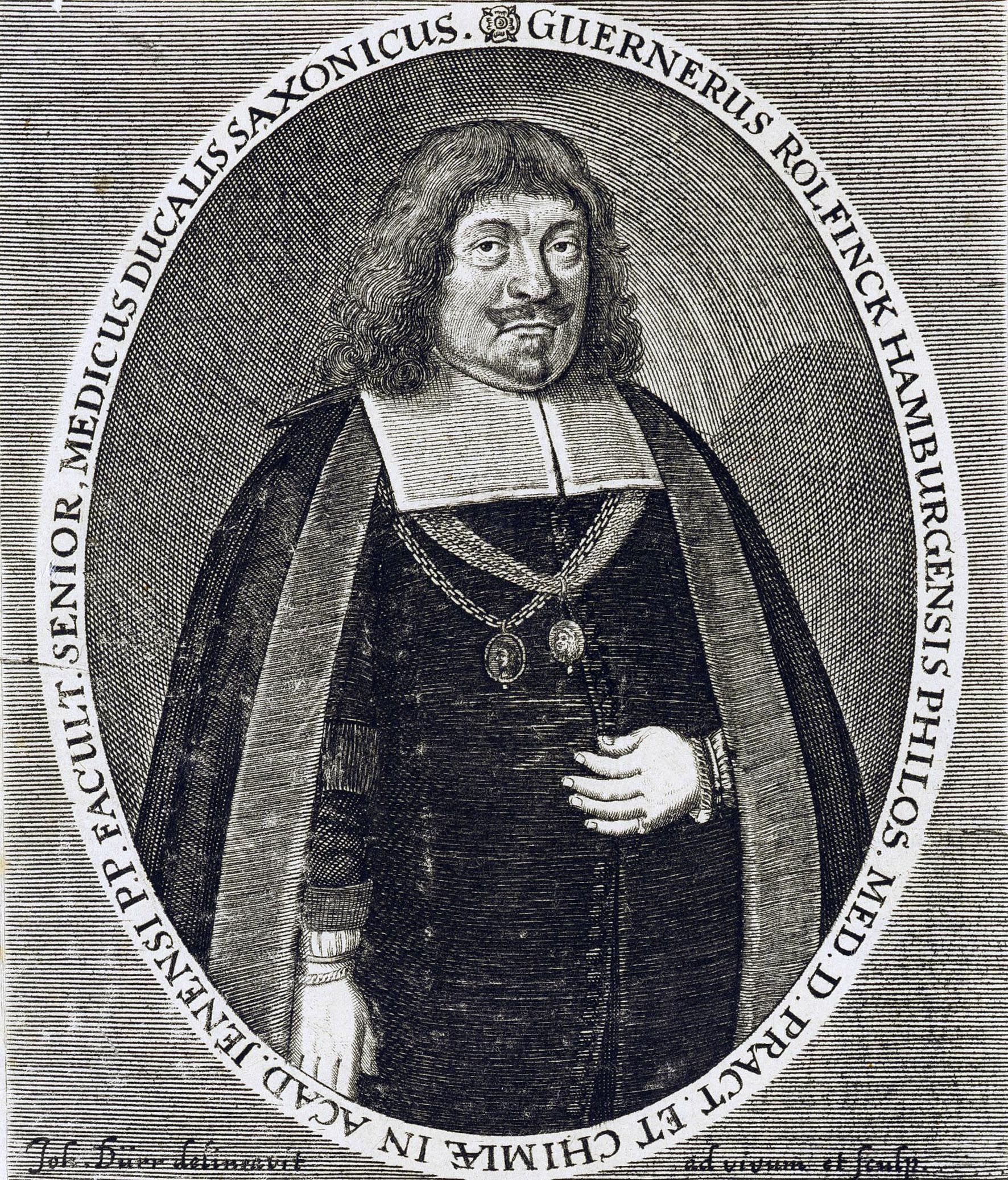
- Born: 15 November 1599; Hamburg
- Died: 6 May 1673 (aged 73); Jena
- Education: University of Wittenberg; University of Padua (M.D., 1625)
- Known for: Studying of chemical reactions and the biochemistry of metals
- Scientific career
- Fields: Medicine, botany, chemistry, philosophy
- Workplaces: University of Jena
- Doctoral advisor: Adriaan van den Spiegel
- Other academic advisors: Daniel Sennert
- Doctoral students: Georg Wolfgang Wedel

Werner Rolfinck (15 November 1599 – 6 May 1673) was a German physician, scientist and botanist. He was a medical student in Leiden, Oxford, Paris, and Padua.

== Biography ==
Rolfinck earned his master's degree at the University of Wittenberg under Daniel Sennert, and his medical doctorate in 1625 at the University of Padua under the guidance of Adriaan van den Spiegel.

In 1629, he became a professor at the University of Jena, where he, along with Paul Marquard Schlegel, rearranged and expanded the university's botanical garden (the Botanischer Garten Jena). His experimental research involved chemical reactions and the biochemistry of metals acquiring him the title of "director of chemical exercises". He rejected the view that other metals could be transformed into gold.

== Works ==
- Guerneri Rolfincii, Phil. Ac Med. Doctoris Et Professoris Publici Chimia In Artis Formam Redacta : Sex Libris comprehensa .... Genevae, 1671 Digital edition of the University and State Library Düsseldorf.
