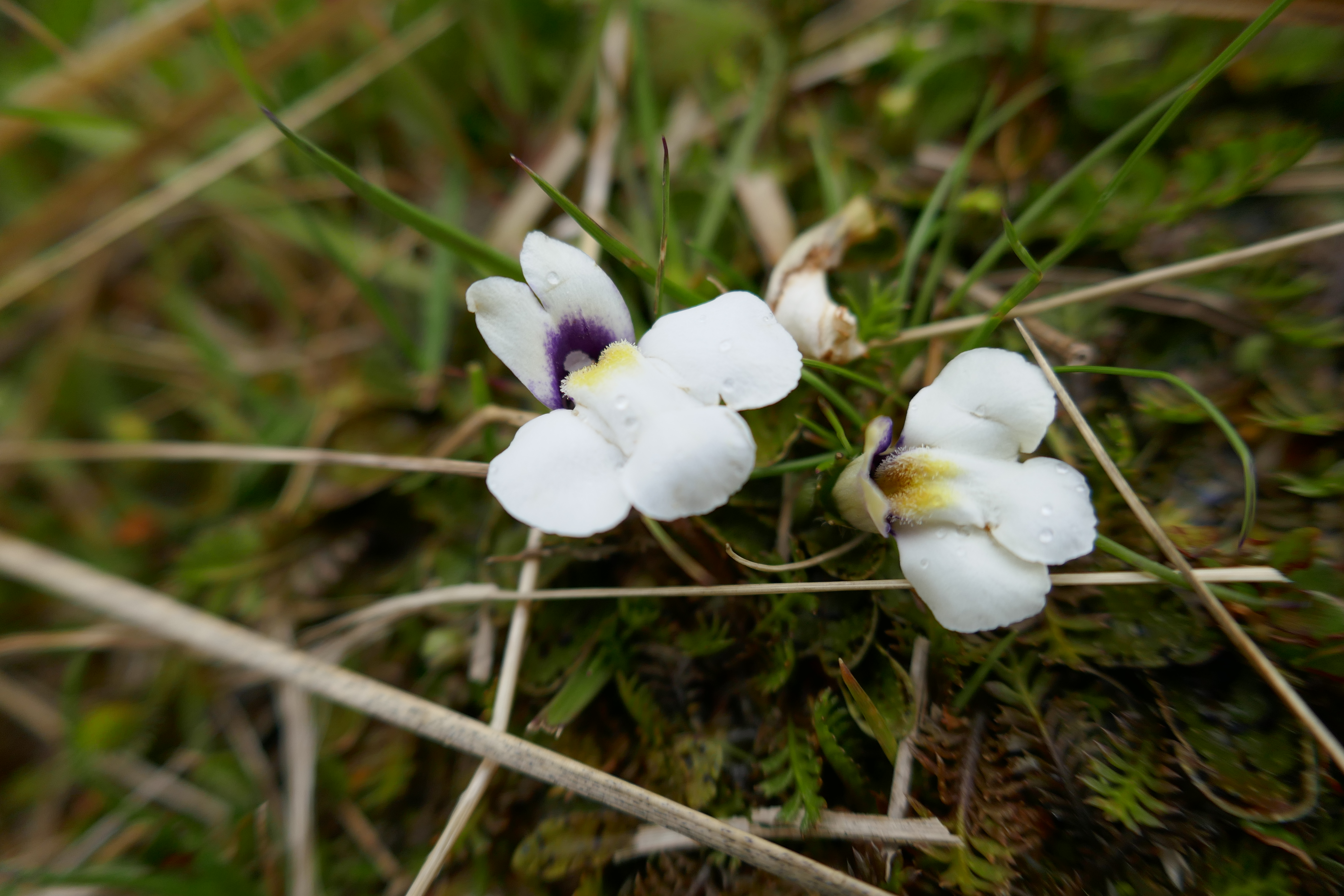

Scientific classification
- Kingdom: Plantae
- Clade: Tracheophytes
- Clade: Angiosperms
- Clade: Eudicots
- Clade: Asterids
- Order: Lamiales
- Family: Mazaceae
- Genus: Mazus
- Species: M. radicans

Binomial name
- Mazus radicans Cheeseman, 1906

= Mazus radicans =

Species of flowering plant

Mazus radicans, commonly known as swamp musk, is a wetland herb in the family Mazaceae, native to New Zealand.

== Description ==
M. radicans is a small, creeping wetland herb which is native to New Zealand. It has prostrate main branches rooting at nodes. The lateral branches are short and leafy with distinctive internodes on leaf-bearing or subterranean and horizontal branches. Leaves are a brownish colour. The petiole is 3–70 mm (0.12–2.76 in) long and has membranous wings lined on each side. Leaves are obovate or elliptic or more broadly, about 5–35 mm (0.20–1.38 in) by 4–15 mm (0.16–0.59 in). The base of leaves is gradually small and blade margin is slightly undulate to serrate and broad-acute to rounded at apex. Margins have soft hairs. Inflorescences are usually on a terminal of the short lateral branches, with 15–130 mm (0.59–5.12 in) long flowers. Pedicels usually lack bracts and fall off early. Bracteoles are the same size and shape, which alternate along pedicels about 3–35 mm (0.12–1.38 in). The lower bracteole buds occasionally, and are 2.5–7 mm (0.098–0.276 in) long and a little hairy. Its calyx is about 3–7.5 mm (0.12–0.30 in) long with purple flowers. Externally, it is white with purple flesh; the internal flesh is deep purple. It has a white and yellow lip. The lower lip has rounded lobes, that are glabrous apart from the palate. The length of the tube is twice that of the calyx. The upper lip is about 4–8.5 mm (0.16–0.33 in) long and has capsule fruit that does not fall off. The fruit is pink and red in colour and broadly ellipsoid.

== Distribution ==
=== New Zealand range ===
It is a common wetland weed on the South Island. It can be seen in damp places such as wild wetland and swamp. As an endemic species in North Island, it appears in Awanui near Kaitaia, Hautai Beach and Waipapa Stream near East Cape. It survives in higher regions in New Zealand up to 100–1100 m above sea level. It occurs in alpine regions up to 1,200 m (3,900 ft) from Mt Egmont\Taranaki and the Huiarau Ranges southwards to Fiordland.

=== Habitat preferences ===
It is found in lowland swamp forest in sparsely-vegetated coastal wetlands and in moist sub-alpline areas. It prefers places with short and thick sedges and grasses, often in sites with seasonal water cover or in areas of heavy grazing.

== Life cycle ==
M. radicans is a perennial or annual herb. It usually has a flower from November to March in New Zealand. The flowering time is in summer. In autumn, fruits mature, but do not fall off the plant. Fresh seeds are easy to germinate and the best environment for its reproduction is permanently moist or badly drained earth under the shade, which is a good ground shelter. The flowers are pollinated by bees.
