= Paul Marquard Schlegel =

German physician and anatomist (1605–1653)

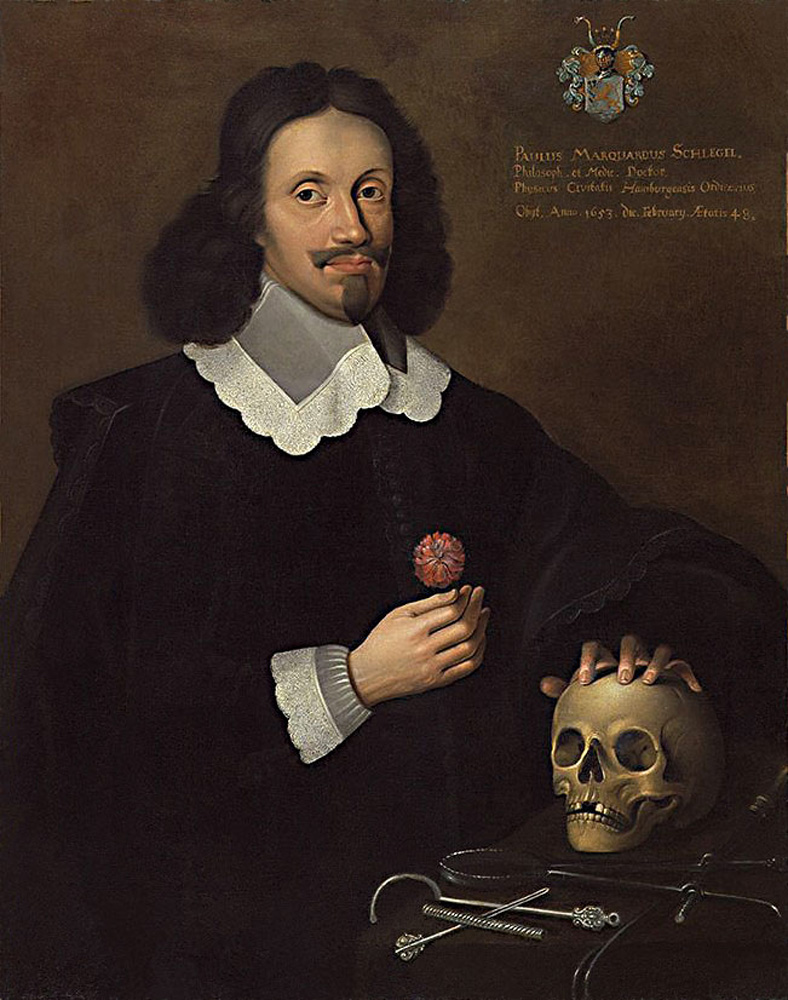

Paul Marquard Schlegel Latinized as Paulus Marquartus Slegelius (23 August 1605 – 20 February 1653) was a German physician and anatomist known for his public demonstrations in anatomy and for being an early proponent of blood circulation. The plant genus Schlegelia was named in his honour.

== Life and work ==
Schlegel was born in Hamburg where his father Martin Schlegel (died 1609) was a wealthy merchant who wished his son would study law. By the age of ten, he lost both parents. He was influenced by the teachings of Rector Paul Sperling (1560–1630), Georg Fabricius (1590–1631) and Johann Starcke at the Johanneum. Schlegel joined the University of Rostock to study law but found it uninteresting and quit to study the natural sciences, first at Altdorf (1626, where his teachers included Georg Nößler, Ludwig Jungermann and Caspar Hofmann) and then at Wittenberg where he became a friend of Werner Rolfinck. In 1629 Rolfinck became a professor of anatomy and botany at Jena and Schlegel also moved there. From 1631, he began to visit medical centres, training and travelling through Europe. He first went to the University of Leiden followed by a visit to England. in France and Italy starting from 1631, and received a doctoral degree from Padua in 1636 before returning to Germany. He became a professor of medicine and botany at Jena in 1638. Here he worked with Rolfinck to establish a (medicinal) botanical garden. The Duke of Weimar made him his personal physician and in 1642 he moved to Hamburg as subphysicus (deputy of the city physicus or stadtphysicus). He developed a circle of distinguished medical practitioners and began lectures on anatomy at the anatomical theatre which included dissections of human cadavers, despite religious objections to these practices. He promoted his correspondent William Harvey's views on blood circulation on which he wrote De Sanguinis Motu Commentatio (1650). He made use of cadavers particularly of people killed by capital punishment or who had died from other causes. It is often claimed that on 31 January 1653, he went to examine the frozen corpse of hanged man and the body accidentally fell on him causing injuries from which he died on 20th February. This has been noted as being untrue and that he died from a fever. His books and letters are now in the Hamburg City Library.

Schlegel married Elisabeth Hüpken, daughter of Swedish merchant, in 1643 and they had four sons and two daughters, although none survived to old age.

== Writings ==
Schelegel's writings include:

- Problema, an Spiritus nutriatur externo aere. Altdorf 1627
- Disp. de Hydrope. Wittenberg 1628
- Disp. de suffocatione uterina, pro loco in Collegio medico habita. Jena 1638.
- De calculo renum et vesicae. Jena 1688.
- Oratio. Liceatne medicis, tanta muliercularum ignorantia grassante, obstetricum opera defungi? Jena 1638.
- Carmen, Joh. Veslingii observationibus de plantis Aegyptiacis. Padua 1638.
- De Empyemate. Jena 1639
- De palpitatione cordis. Jena 1639
- Disp. de dentibus. Jena 1639
- Programma de selectioribus rei herbariae scriptoribus hortisque medicis potioribus, lectionibus botanicis praeroissum. Jena 1639.
- Medicinae Cultoribus S.P.D. eosq[ue ad demirandas nobilissimae partis, quae Chirurgia dicitur, operationes, officiose invitat.] Jena 1639
- De natura lactis. Jena 1640.
- Disp. erysipelate. Jena 1640.
- Disp. de hydrophobia, seu rabie contagiosa. Jena 1640
- Ophthalmographia et Opsioscopia. Jena 1640.
- De haemorrhagia in genere. Jena 1640
- De Ascite. Jena 1640
- Disp. de saluberrimo delectu venarum in corpore humana secandarum. Jena 1641
- De affectione hypochondriaca. Jena 1641
- De epilepsia. Jenae 1642
- De quartana intermittente. Jena 1642
- De ileo. Jena 1642.
- Disp. de lue venerea. Jena 1642
- Commentatio de motu sanguinis, in qua praecipue in Joh. Riolani jun. sententiam inquiritur. Hamburg 1650
- Programma administrationi anatomicae praemissum: Studiosis caelo illud de lapsum … commendat eosque ad contemplatlonem admirandae corporis structurae officiose invitat ad. 25. Jan. 1658. In: J. A. Fabricii: Hantissa Memoriarum Hamb. Band IV, S. 410–416.
- Adversaria memorabilium medicorom. In: G. H. Welsch: Consilia medicinalia. Centuria IV, Ulm 1676.
