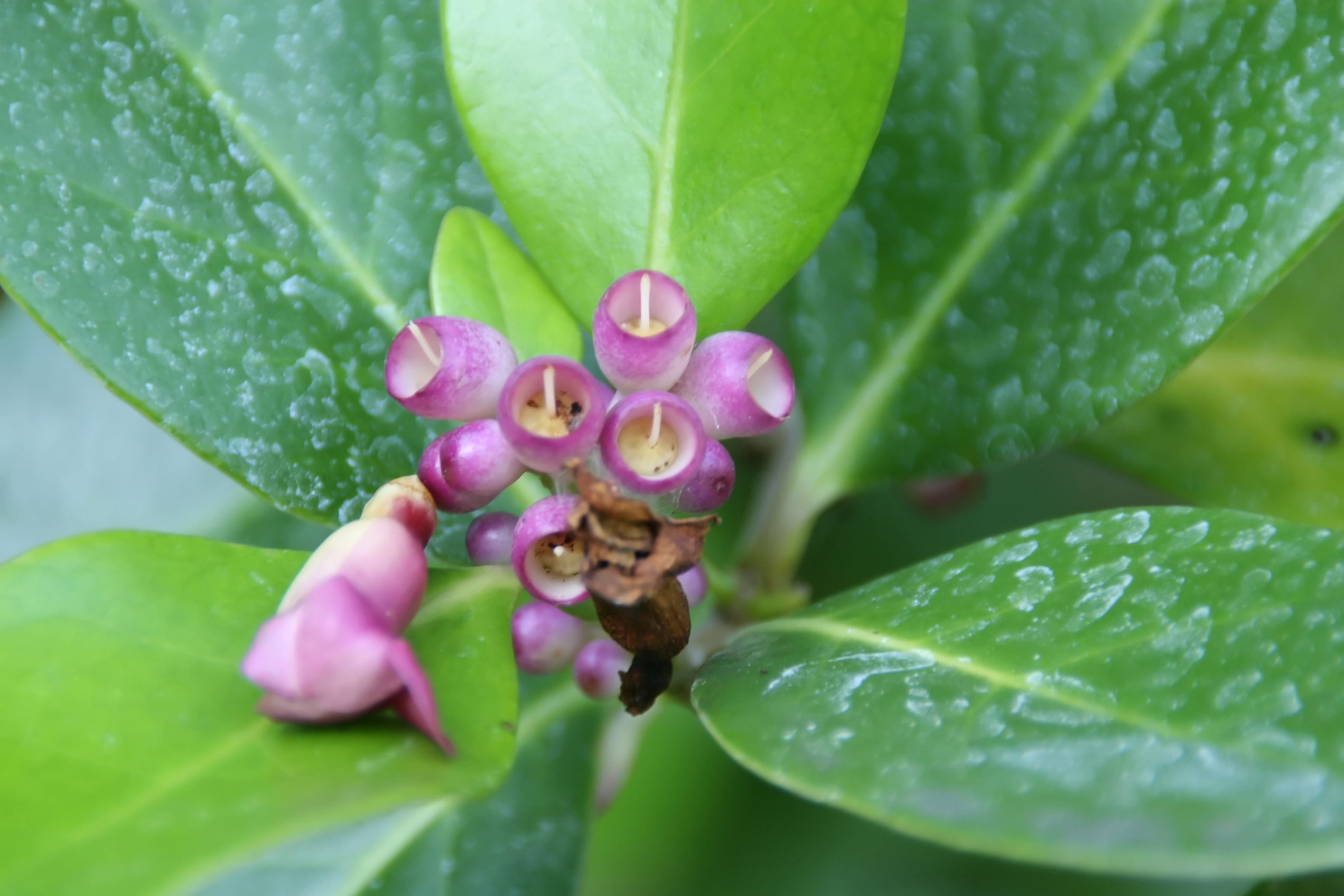
- Schlegelia parasitica flowers

Scientific classification
- Kingdom: Plantae
- Clade: Tracheophytes
- Clade: Angiosperms
- Clade: Eudicots
- Clade: Asterids
- Order: Lamiales
- Family: Schlegeliaceae; A.H.Gentry, Reveal

Genera
- Exarata; Gibsoniothamnus; Schlegelia; Synapsis

= Schlegeliaceae =

Family of plants

Schlegeliaceae is a family of plants native to tropical America. This family is sometimes included in Scrophulariaceae.
