= Salix fruticulosa =

Scientific classification
- Kingdom: Plantae
- Clade: Embryophytes
- Clade: Tracheophytes
- Clade: Spermatophytes
- Clade: Angiosperms
- Clade: Eudicots
- Clade: Rosids
- Order: Malpighiales
- Family: Salicaceae
- Genus: Salix
- Species: S. fruticulosa

Binomial name
- Salix fruticulosa Andersson

Synonyms
- List: Salix brachista var. multiflora Z.Wang & P.Y.Fu; Salix chumulamanica Z.Wang & P.Y.Fu; non Salix fruticulosa S.Lacroix, nom. illeg.; Salix hylematica C.K.Schneid.; Salix hylematica var. scopulicola (P.I.Mao & W.Z.Li) N.Chao & G.T.Gong; Salix nelamunensis Z.Wang & P.Y.Fu; Salix scopulicola P.I.Mao & W.Z.Li; Salix serpyllum Andersson

Species of flowering plant

Salix fruticulosa is a species of flowering plant in the willow family Salicaceae, native to Nepal, the eastern Himalayas, and Tibet. It is common in sub-alpine silver fir–birch forests from 2,800 to 3,800 m (9,200 to 12,500 ft). Although there may some confusion about which species of dwarf willow is intended, Salix fruticulosa is listed by the Royal Horticultural Society as available from commercial suppliers.
