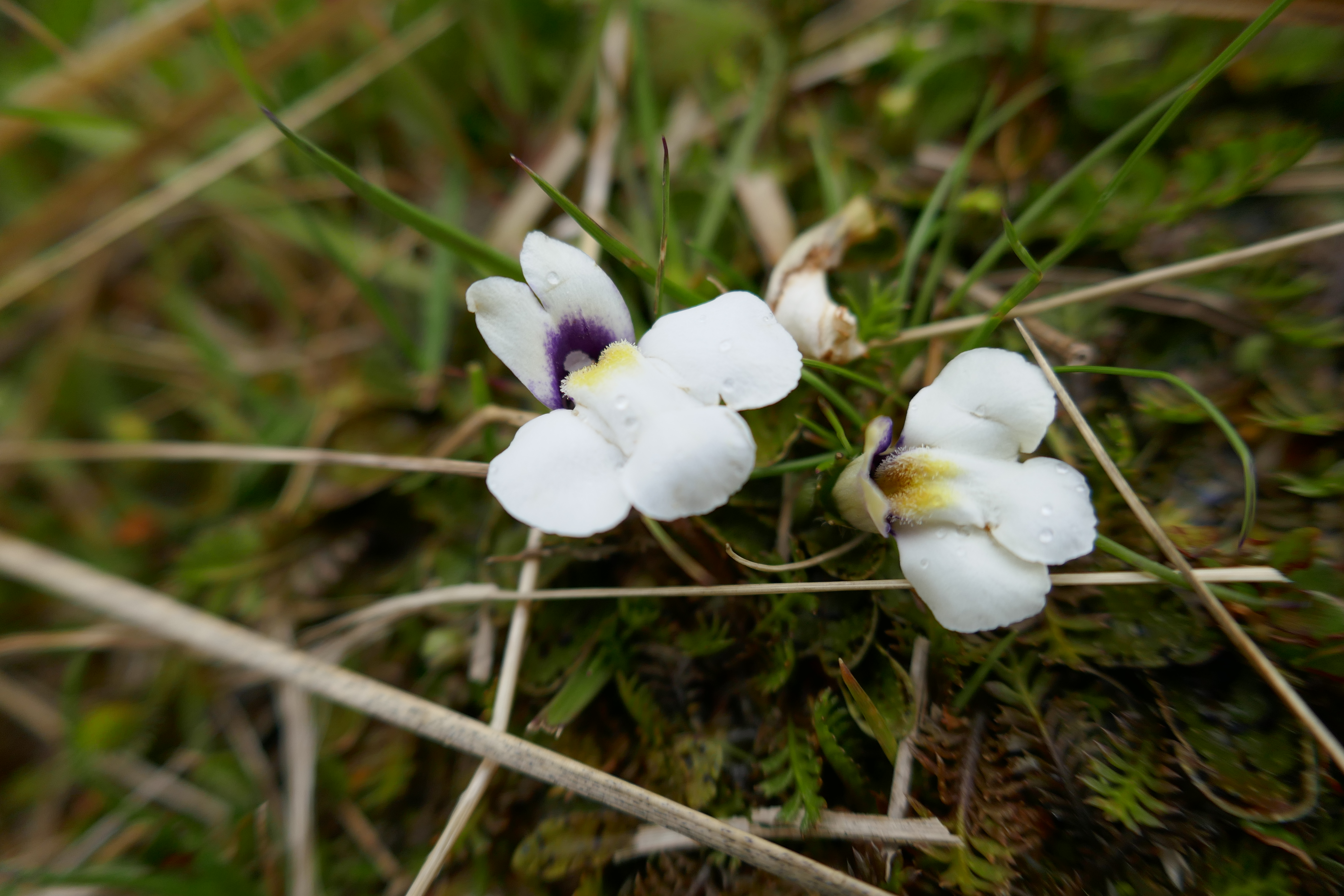
- Mazus radicans

Scientific classification
- Kingdom: Plantae
- Clade: Tracheophytes
- Clade: Angiosperms
- Clade: Eudicots
- Clade: Asterids
- Order: Lamiales
- Family: Mazaceae; Reveal

Genera
- Dodartia Tourn. ex L.; Lancea Hook.f. & Thomson; Mazus Lour.; Puchiumazus Bo Li, D.G.Zhang & C.L.Xiang

= Mazaceae =

Family of flowering plants

Mazaceae is a family of plants in the order Lamiales. The family was described by James L. Reveal in 2011. Genera in this family were most recently previously included in Phrymaceae and in older classifications were placed in Scrophulariaceae.

Plants of the World Online includes four genera:

- Dodartia Tourn. ex L.
- Lancea Hook.f. & Thomson
- Mazus Lour.
- Puchiumazus Bo Li, D.G.Zhang & C.L.Xiang

Germplasm Resources Information Network includes only Lancea and Mazus. The Angiosperm Phylogeny Website includes Dodartia, Lancea, and Mazus.
