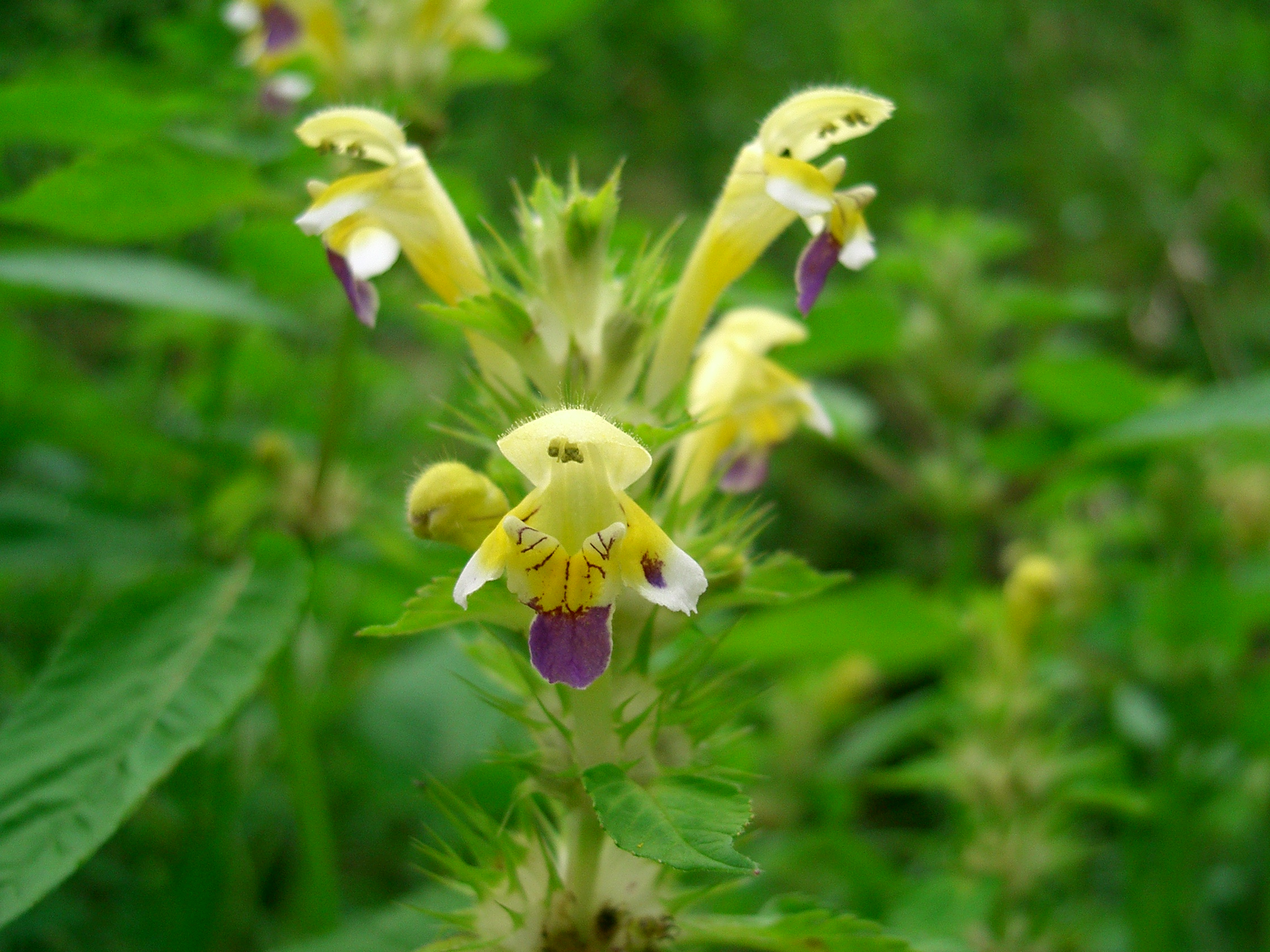
- Galeopsis speciosa

Scientific classification
- Kingdom: Plantae
- Clade: Tracheophytes
- Clade: Angiosperms
- Clade: Eudicots
- Clade: Asterids
- Clade: Lamiids
- Order: Lamiales; Bromhead

Families
- Acanthaceae; Bignoniaceae; Byblidaceae; Calceolariaceae; Carlemanniaceae; Gesneriaceae; Lamiaceae; Linderniaceae; Lentibulariaceae; Martyniaceae; Mazaceae; Oleaceae; Orobanchaceae; Paulowniaceae; Pedaliaceae; Phrymaceae; Plantaginaceae; Plocospermataceae; Schlegeliaceae; Scrophulariaceae; Stilbaceae; Tetrachondraceae; Thomandersiaceae; Verbenaceae

= Lamiales =

Lamiales Temporal range: Ypresian-Recent

Order of dicot flowering plants

The Lamiales (also known as the mint order) are an order of flowering plants in the asterids clade of the Eudicots. Under the APG IV system of flowering plant classification the order consists of 24 families, and includes about 23,810 species and 1,059 genera with representatives found all over the world. Well-known or economically important members of this order include aromatic, culinary, and medicinal herbs such as basil, mint, rosemary, sage, savory, marjoram, oregano, hyssop, thyme, lavender, perilla, lemon verbena, catnip, bee balm, wild dagga, and oriental motherwort, as well as olives, ash trees, teak, foxgloves, lilacs, jasmine, snapdragons, African violets, Jacarandas, Paulownias, butterfly bushes, sesame, and psyllium.

== Description ==
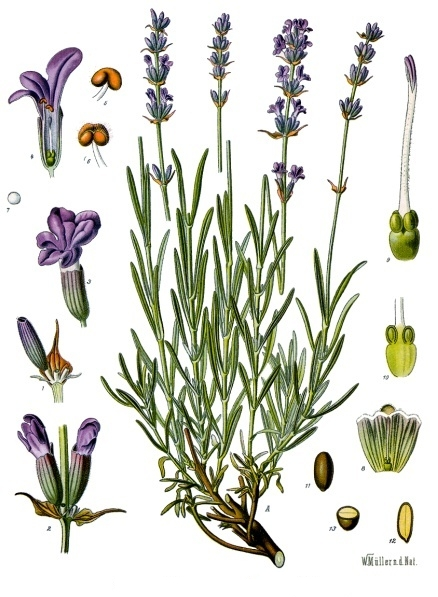
Example of Lamiales characteristics (shown on species Lavandula angustifolia)

Plant species within the order Lamiales are eudicots and are herbaceous or have woody stems. Zygomorphic flowers are common, having five petals with an upper lip of two petals and lower lip of three petals, but actinomorphic flowers are also seen. Species potentially have five stamens, but these are typically reduced to two or four. Lamiales also produce a single style attached to an ovary typically containing two carpels. The ovary is mostly observed to be superior. The inflorescence is typically seen as cyme, raceme or spike. The fruit type is usually dehiscent capsules. Glandular hairs are present on the plants.

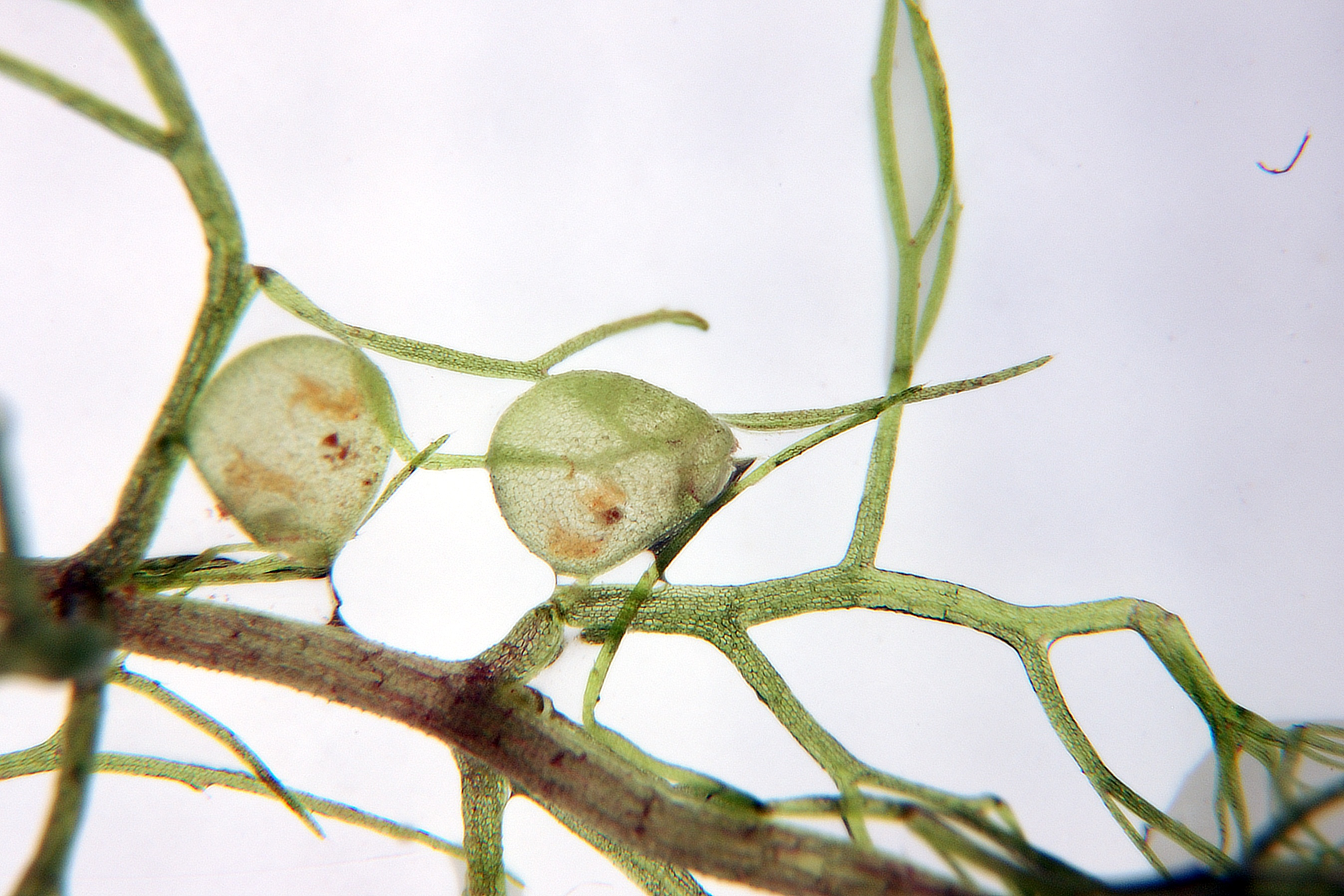
Carnivorous plant in the order Lamiales; Utricularia aurea

A number of species of carnivorous plants are found in the families Lentibulariaceae and Byblidaceae. Protocarnivorous plant species have also been found in the order, specifically in the Martyniaceae family.

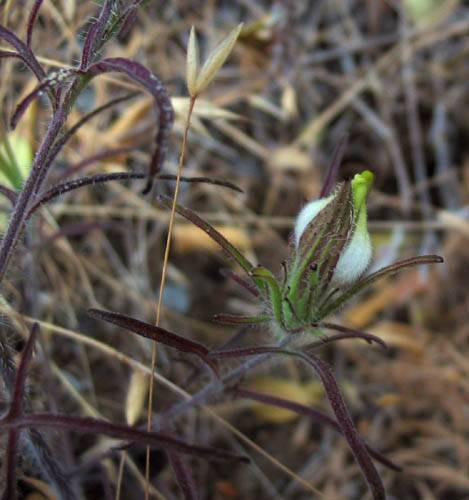
Parasitic plant in the order Lamiales; Cordylanthus rigidus

Parasitic plant species are found in the order, belonging to the family Orobanchaceae. These parasitic plants can either be hemi-parasites or holoparasites.

== Taxonomy ==
=== Phylogeny ===
The APG IV system gives the following cladogram for Lamiales.

- Lamiales
  - Plocospermataceae
  - - - Carlemanniaceae
      - Oleaceae
    - - Tetrachondraceae
      - - - Peltantheraceae
          - - Calceolariaceae
            - Gesneriaceae
        - - Plantaginaceae
          - - Scrophulariaceae
            - - Stilbaceae
              - - - Byblidaceae
                  - Linderniaceae
                - - - Acanthaceae
                    - Martyniaceae
                    - Pedaliaceae
                  - - Bignoniaceae
                    - - - - Lentibulariaceae
                          - Schlegeliaceae
                        - - Thomandersiaceae
                          - Verbenaceae
                      - - Lamiaceae
                        - - Mazaceae
                          - - Phrymaceae
                            - - Orobanchaceae
                              - Paulowniaceae

The Lamiales previously had a restricted circumscription (e.g., by Arthur Cronquist) that included the major families Lamiaceae (Labiatae), Verbenaceae, and Boraginaceae, plus a few smaller families. In the classification system of Dahlgren the Lamiales were in the superorder Lamiiflorae (also called Lamianae). Recent phylogenetic work has shown the Lamiales are polyphyletic with respect to order Scrophulariales and the two groups are now usually combined in a single order that also includes the former orders Hippuridales and Plantaginales. Lamiales has become the preferred name for this much larger combined group. The placement of the Boraginaceae is unclear, but phylogenetic work shows this family does not belong in Lamiales.

Also, the circumscription of family Scrophulariaceae, formerly a paraphyletic group defined primarily by plesiomorphic characters and from within which numerous other families of the Lamiales were derived, has been radically altered to create a number of smaller, better-defined, and putatively monophyletic families.

=== Dating ===
Much research has been conducted in recent years regarding the dating the Lamiales lineage, although there still remains some ambiguity. A 2004 study, on the molecular phylogenetic dating of asterid flowering plants, estimated 106 million years (MY) for the stem lineage of Lamiales. A similar study in 2009 estimated 80 million years. Another 2009 study gives several reasons why the issue is particularly difficult to solve.

== Habitat ==
The Lamiales order can be found in almost all kinds of habitats world-wide. These habitats include forests, valleys, grasslands, rocky terrain, rainforests, the tropics, temperate regions, marshes, coastlines, and even frozen areas.

== Uses ==
The order Lamiales has a variety of species with anthropogenic uses, the most popular belonging to the Lamiaceae and Acanthaceae families. Many of these species in the order Lamiales produce medicinal properties from alkaloids and saponins to help a variety of infections and diseases. These alkaloids and saponins may help with digestion, the common cold or flu, asthma, liver infections, pulmonary infections and contain antioxidant properties.

Species within the order are also known to have properties to repel insects and help control harmful diseases from insects, such as Malaria from mosquitos. Plants of the family Acanthaceae have bioactive secondary metabolites within their mature leaves, which have been found to be toxic to insect larvae. Botanical derived insecticides are a good alternate for chemical or synthetic insecticides as it is inexpensive, abundant and safe for other plants, non-target organisms and the environment.

Many species within the order are used as decorations, flavouring agents, cosmetics and fragrances. Natural dyes can also be extracted from Lamiales species. For example, in Sardinia culture, the most common Lamiales plant species used for natural dyes is Lavandula stoechas, where a light-green dye is extracted from the stem.
