= List of plant family names with etymologies =

Irises, by Vincent van Gogh. The iris (from Greek for "rainbow") is in the family Iridaceae.

Since the first edition of Carl Linnaeus's Species Plantarum in 1753, plants have been assigned one epithet or name for their species and one name for their genus, a grouping of related species. Related genera are in turn grouped into families. Each family's formal name ends in the Latin suffix -aceae and is derived from the name of a genus that is or once was part of the family.

The table below contains seed-bearing families from Plants of the World by Maarten J. M. Christenhusz (lead author), Michael F. Fay and Mark W. Chase, with two updated families (Note: Calceolariaceae and Viburnaceae) from Plants of the World Online. The second column gives the family's original type genus, unless that name is no longer accepted in taxonomic databases. The fourth column gives an associated meaning, derivation or person.

== Key ==
LG: derived from a Greek word (G), a Latin word (L), another language (–), or a personal name (P)
Ba: listed in Ross Bayton's The Gardener's Botanical
Bu: listed in Lotte Burkhardt's Index of Eponymic Plant Names
CS: listed in both Allen Coombes's The A to Z of Plant Names and William T. Stearn's Stearn's Dictionary of Plant Names for Gardeners
Gl: listed in David Gledhill's The Names of Plants
Qu: listed in Umberto Quattrocchi's four-volume CRC World Dictionary of Plant Names
St: listed in Stearn's Dictionary of Plant Names for Gardeners
Linked numerical citations in the last column refer to Plants of the World.

Except for Plants of the World, these books list genera alphabetically. "Latin plant name" or "Greek plant name" in the fourth column means that the name appears in Classical Latin or Greek or both for some plant, not necessarily the plant listed here.

== Families ==
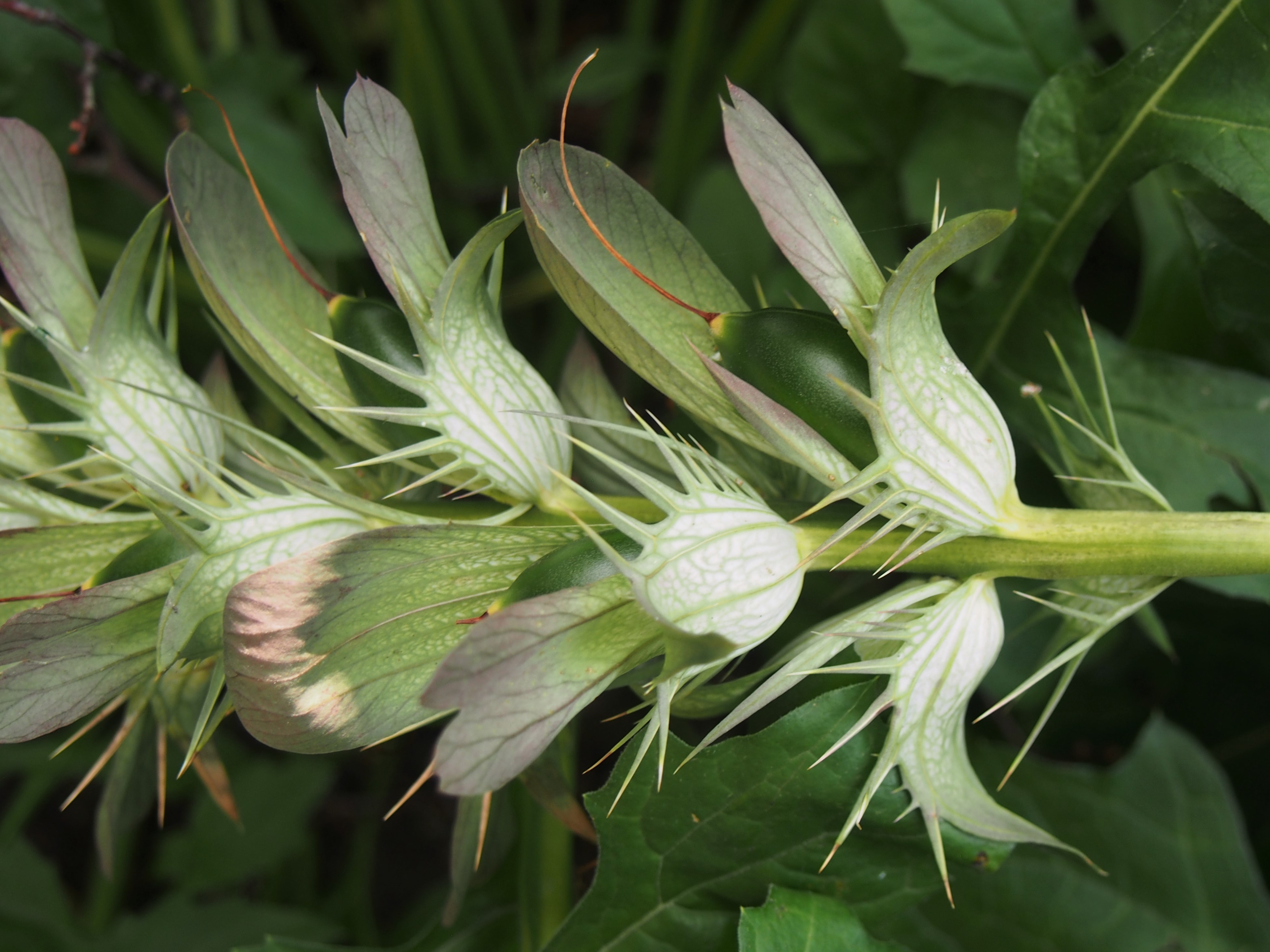
Acanthus

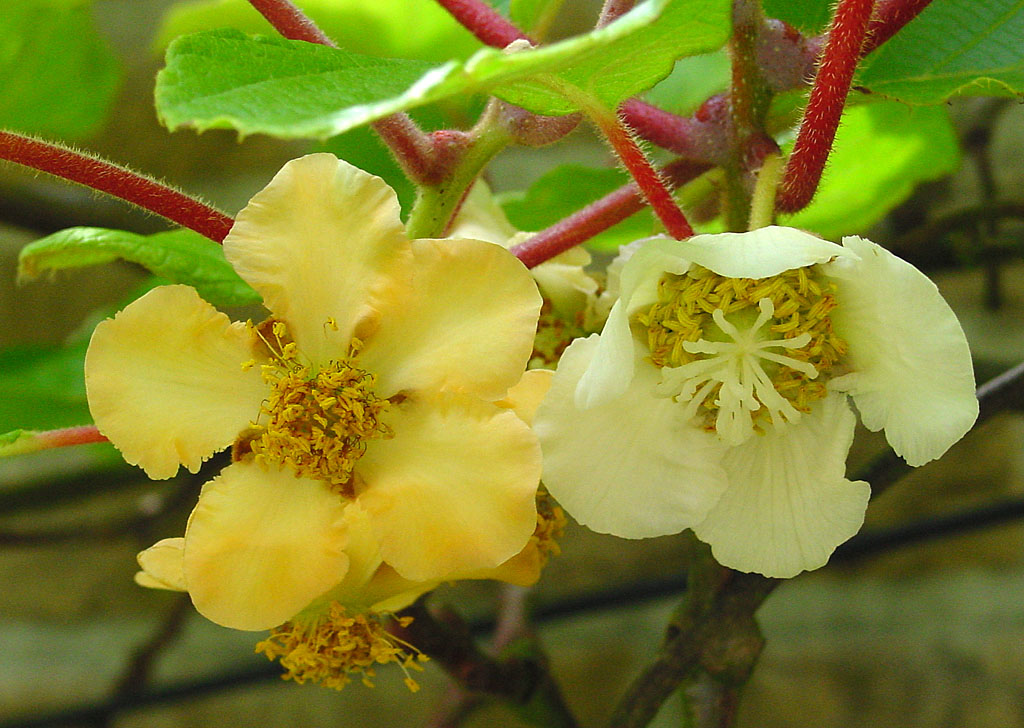
Actinidia←

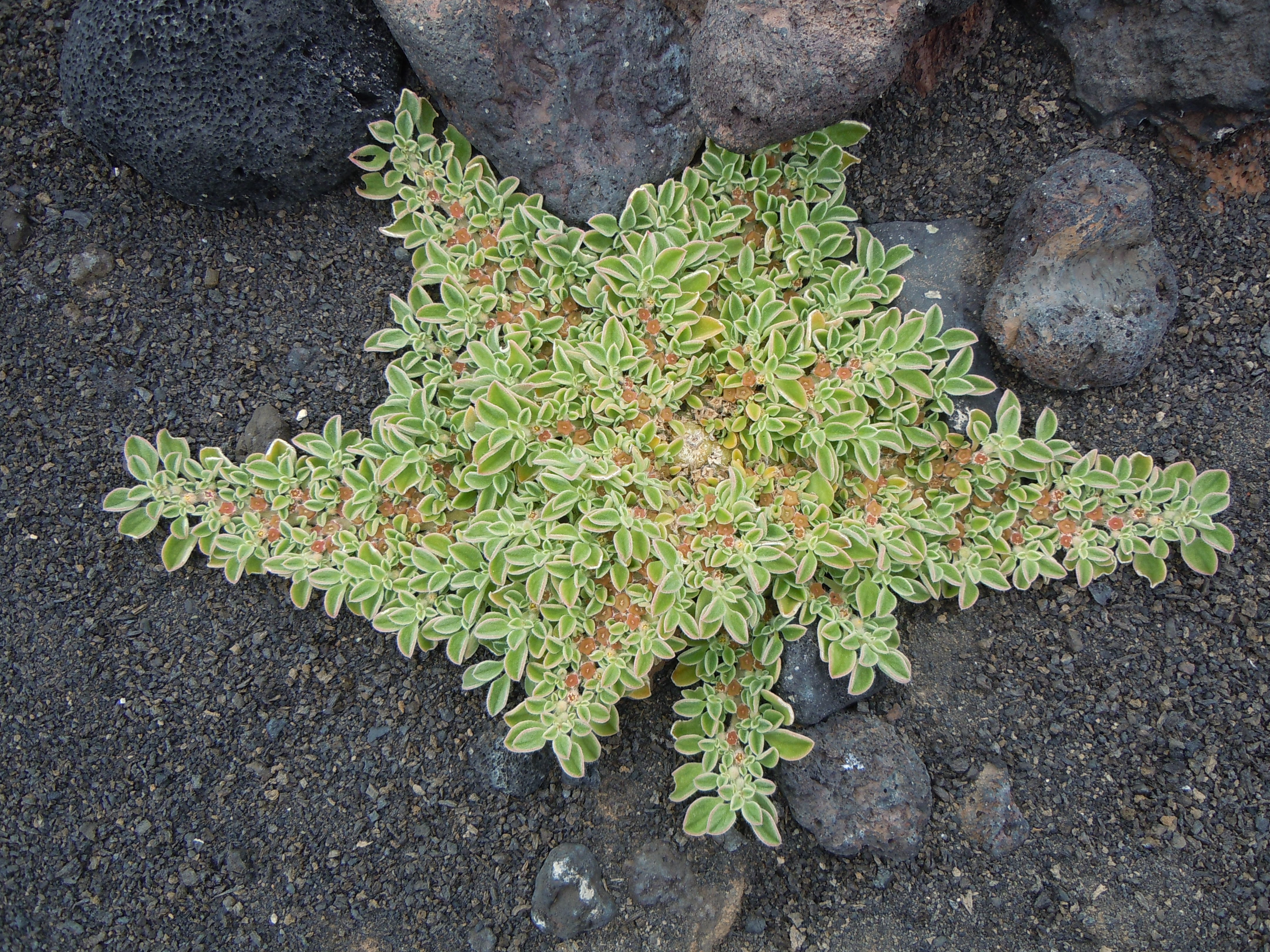
Aizoon

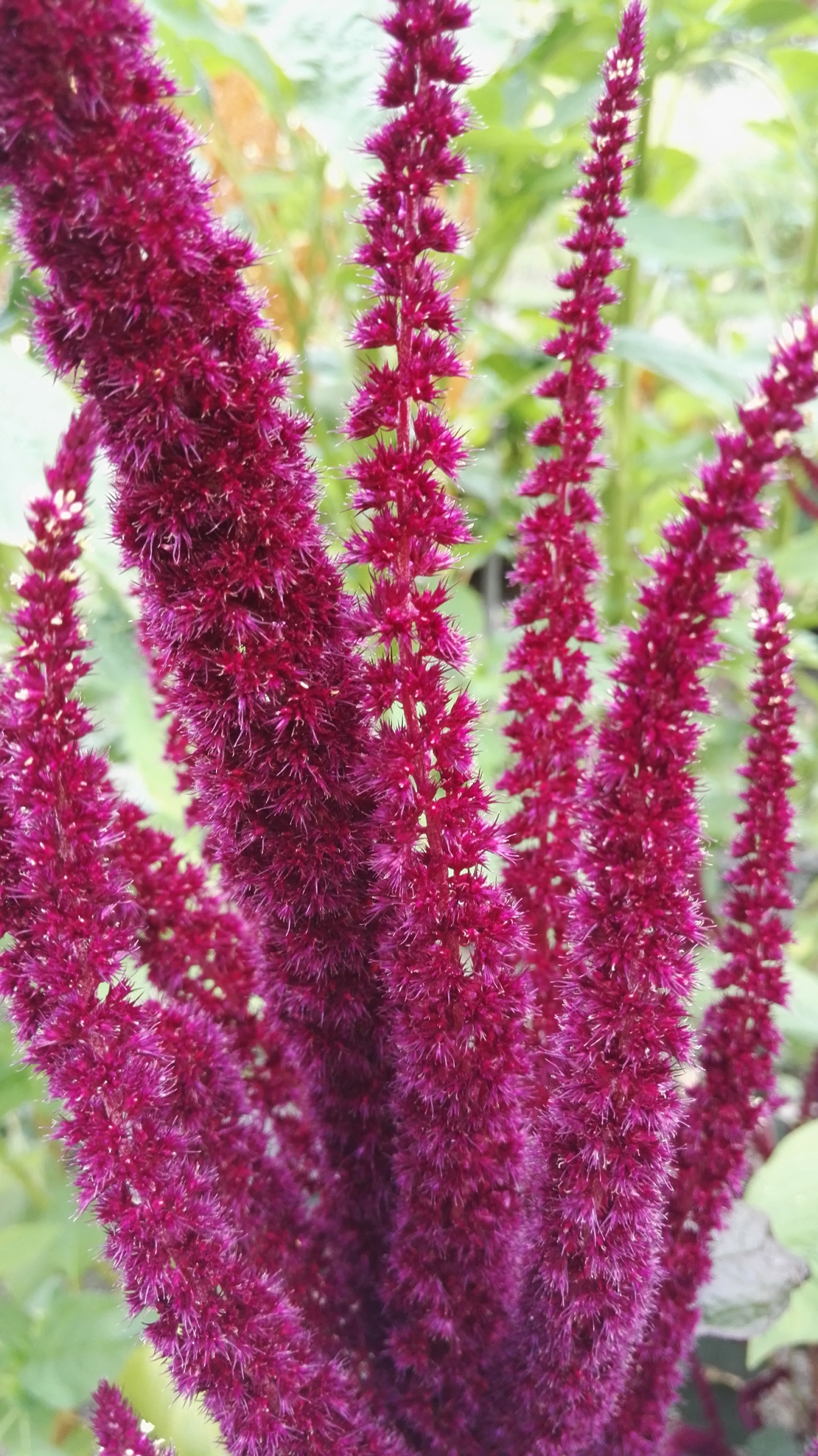
Amaranthus

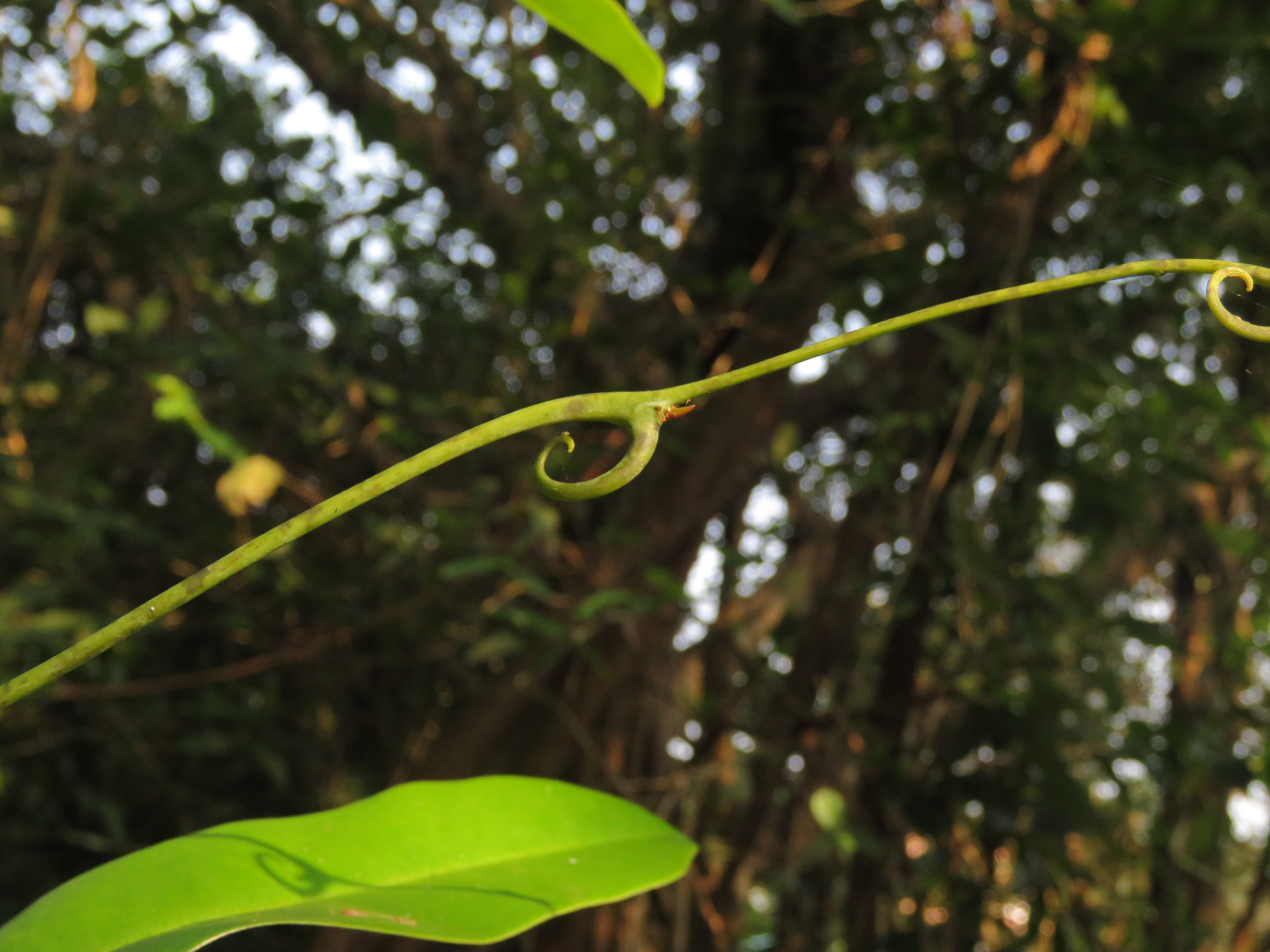
Ancistrocladus

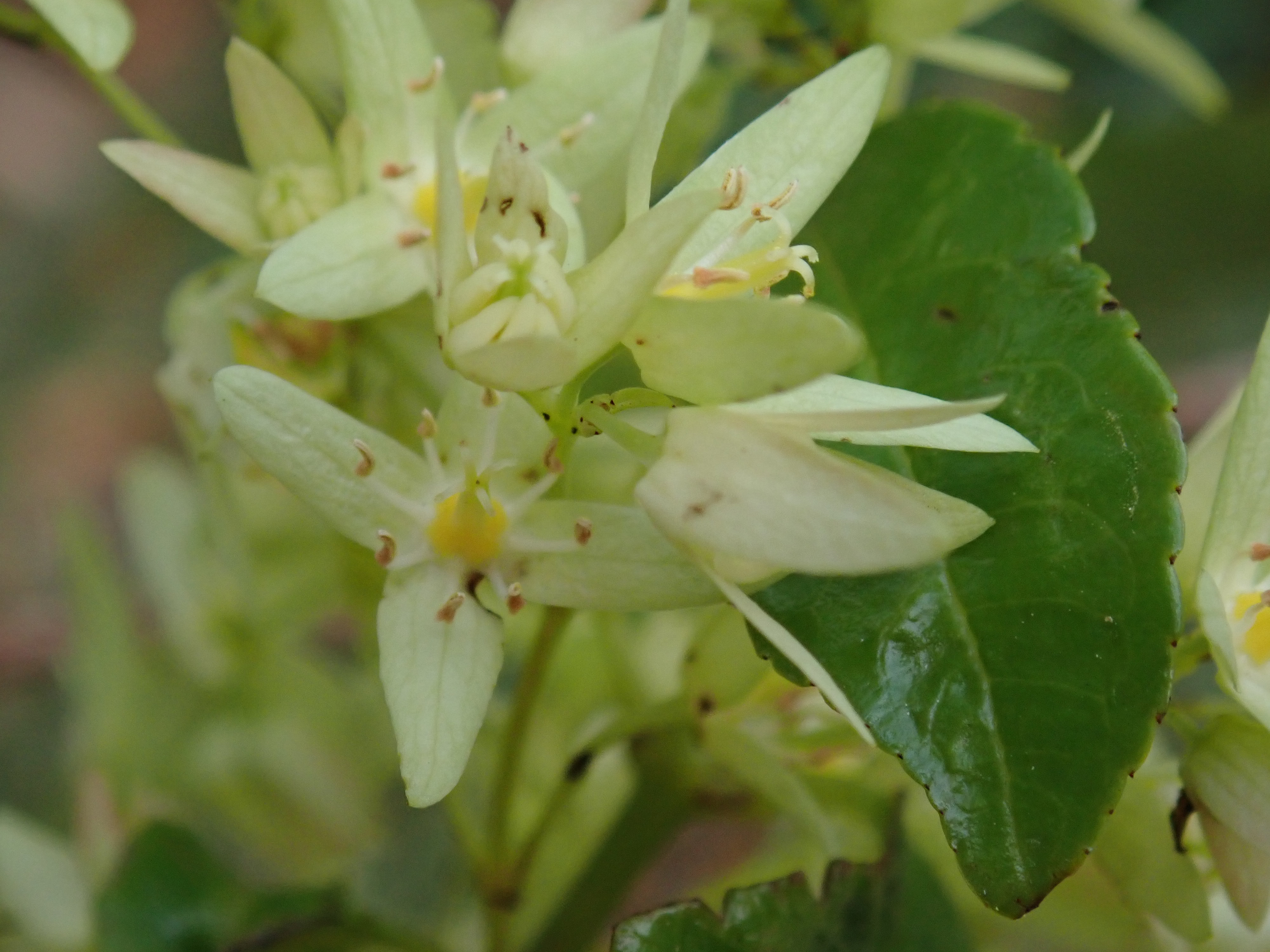
Aphanopetalum

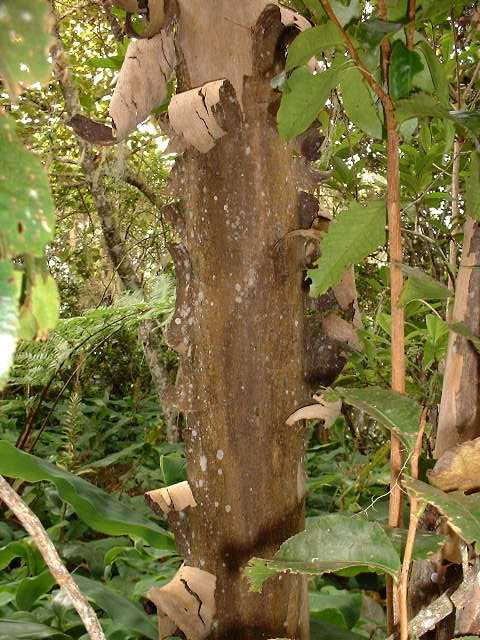
Aphloia

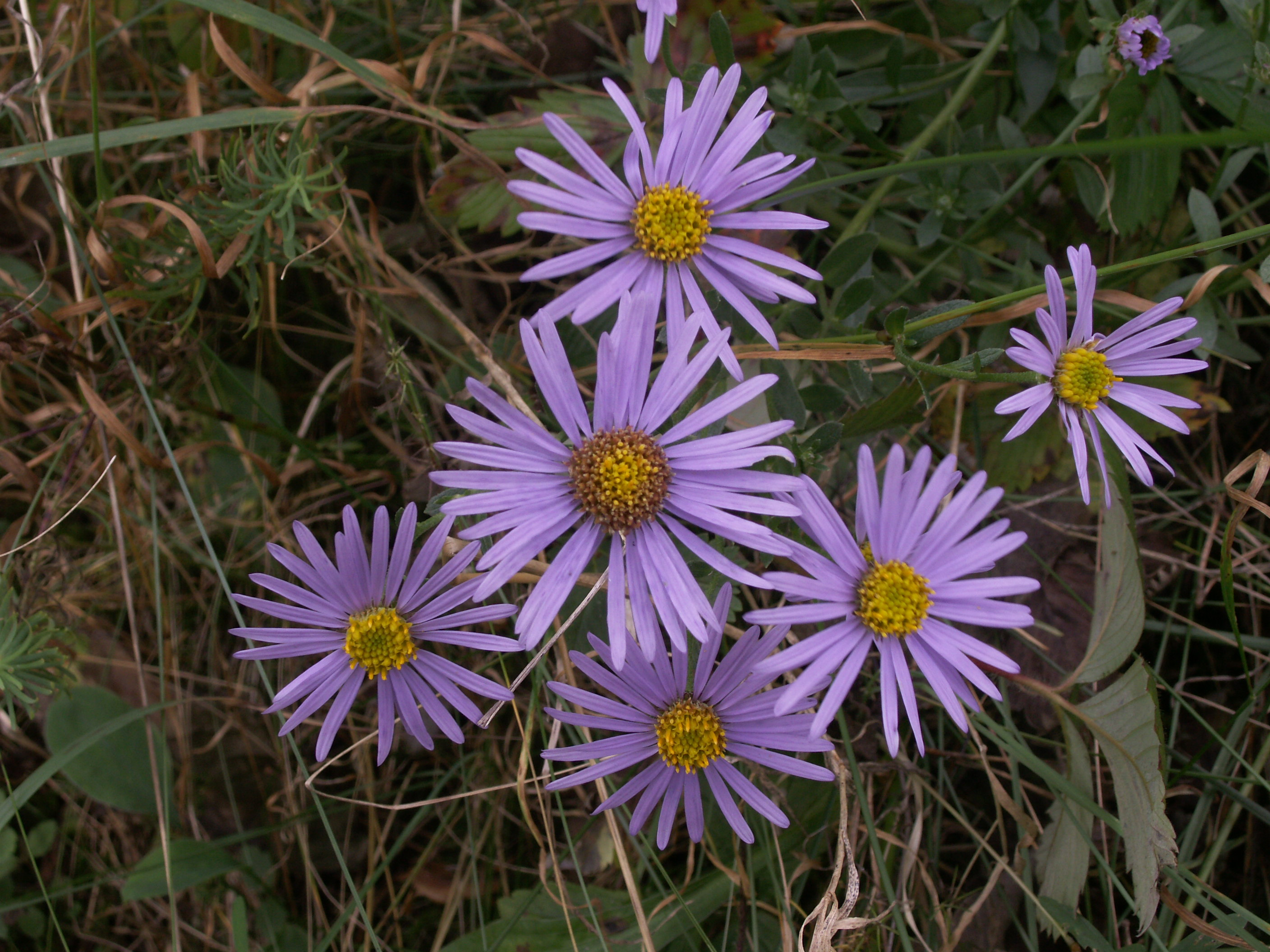
Aster

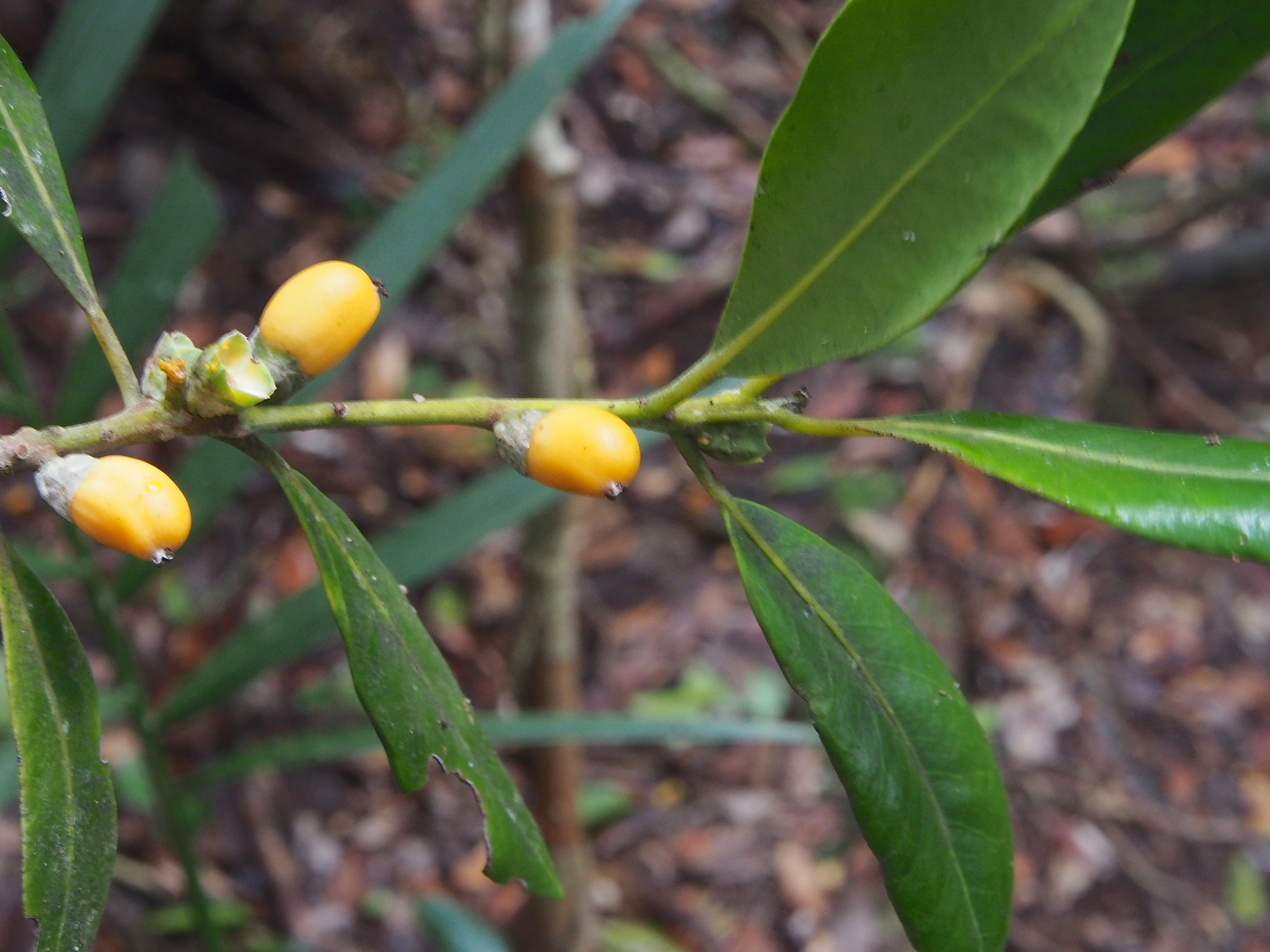
Balanops

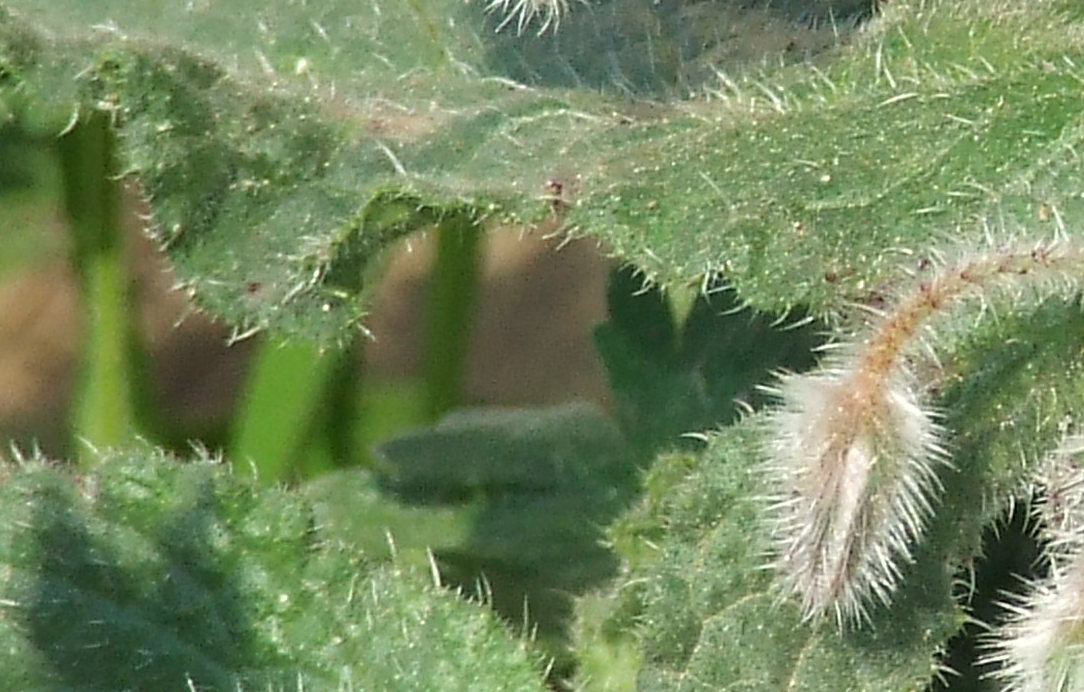
Borago

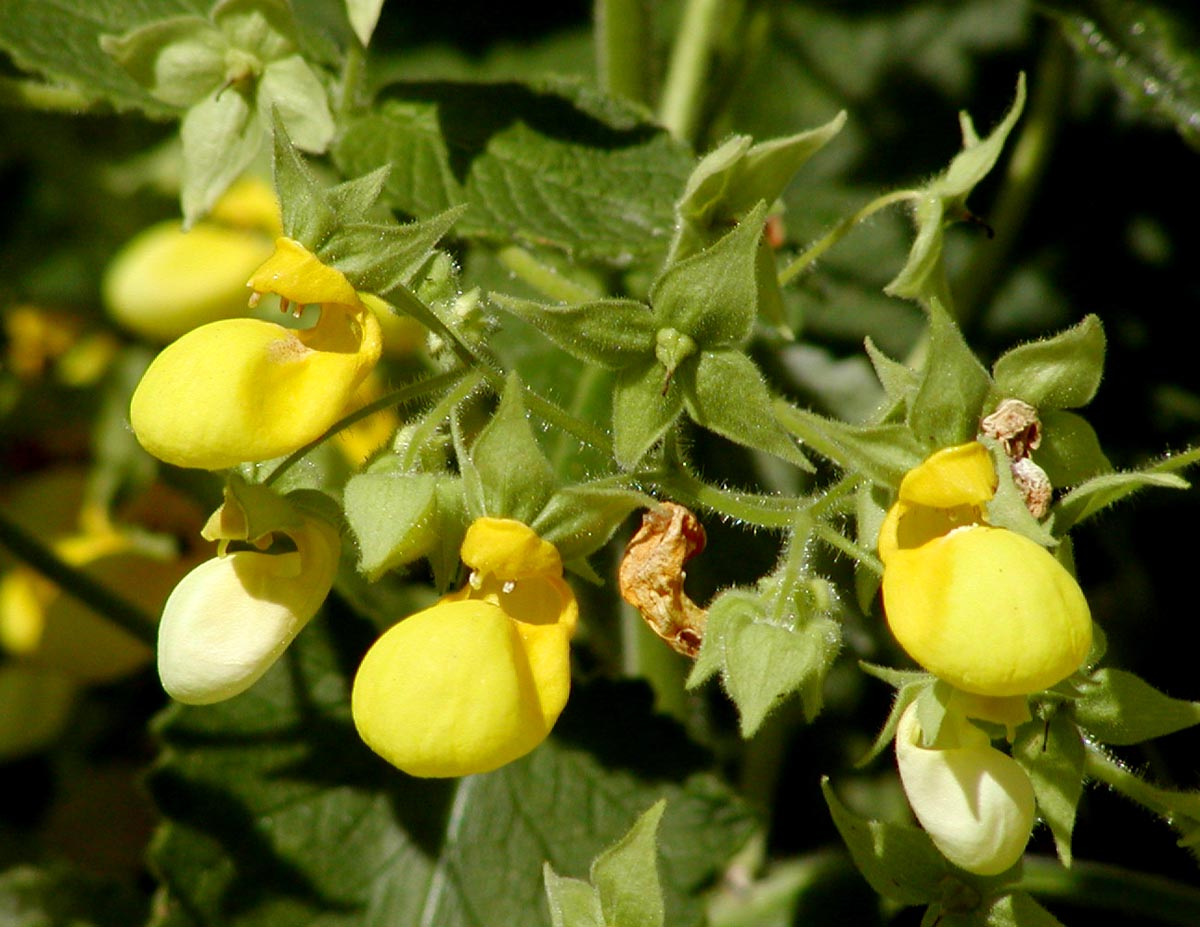
Calceolaria

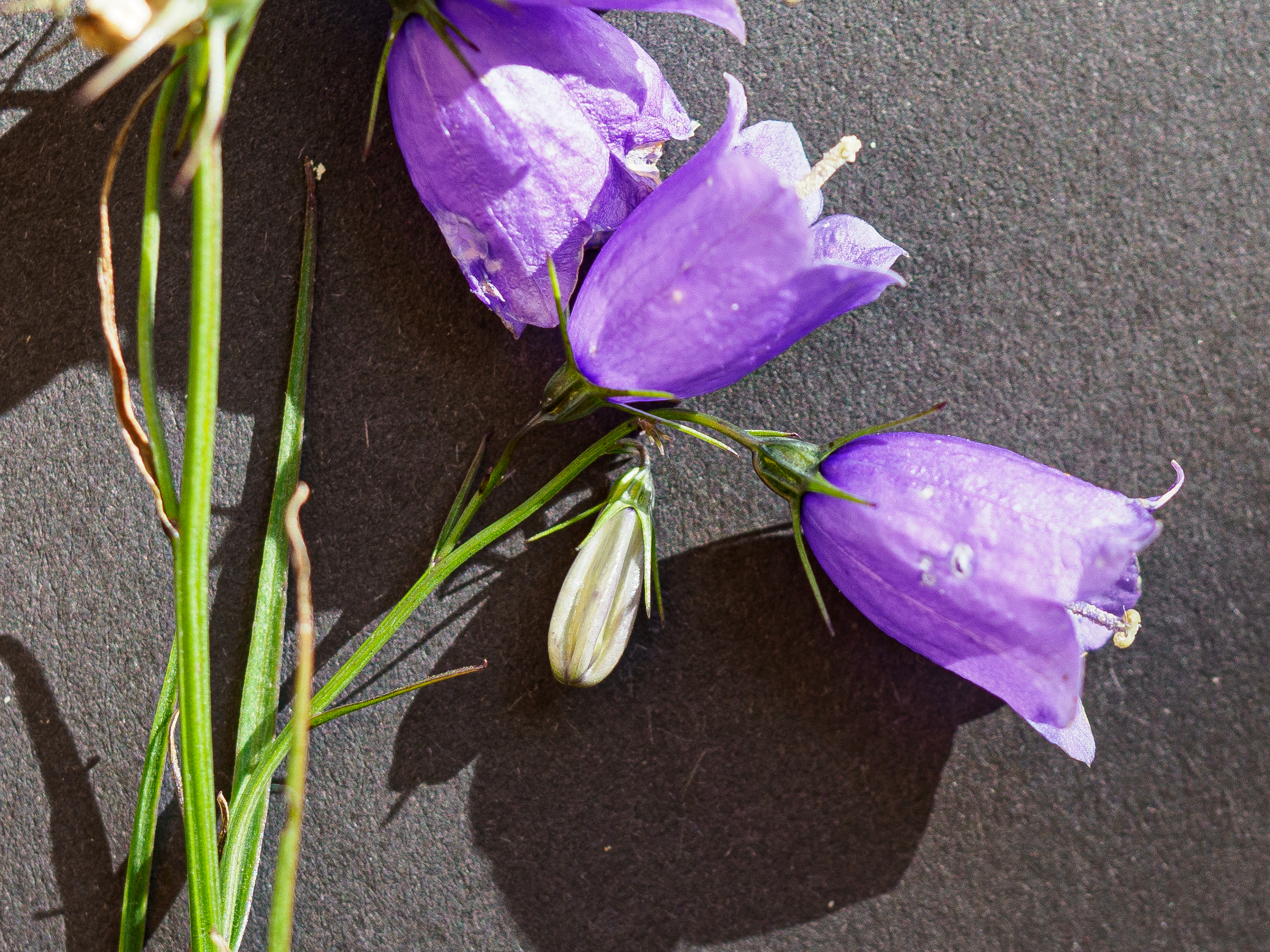
Campanula

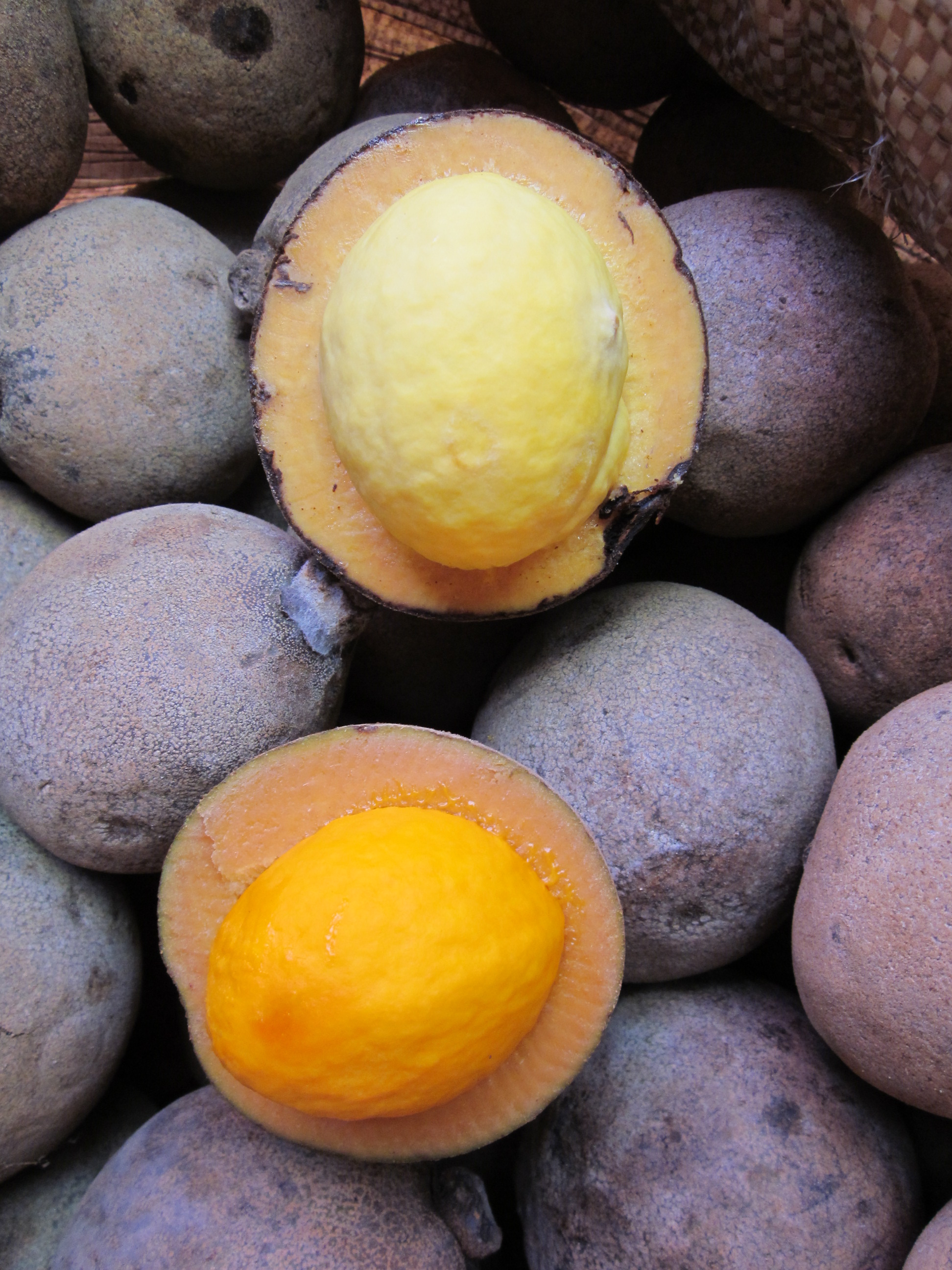
Caryocar

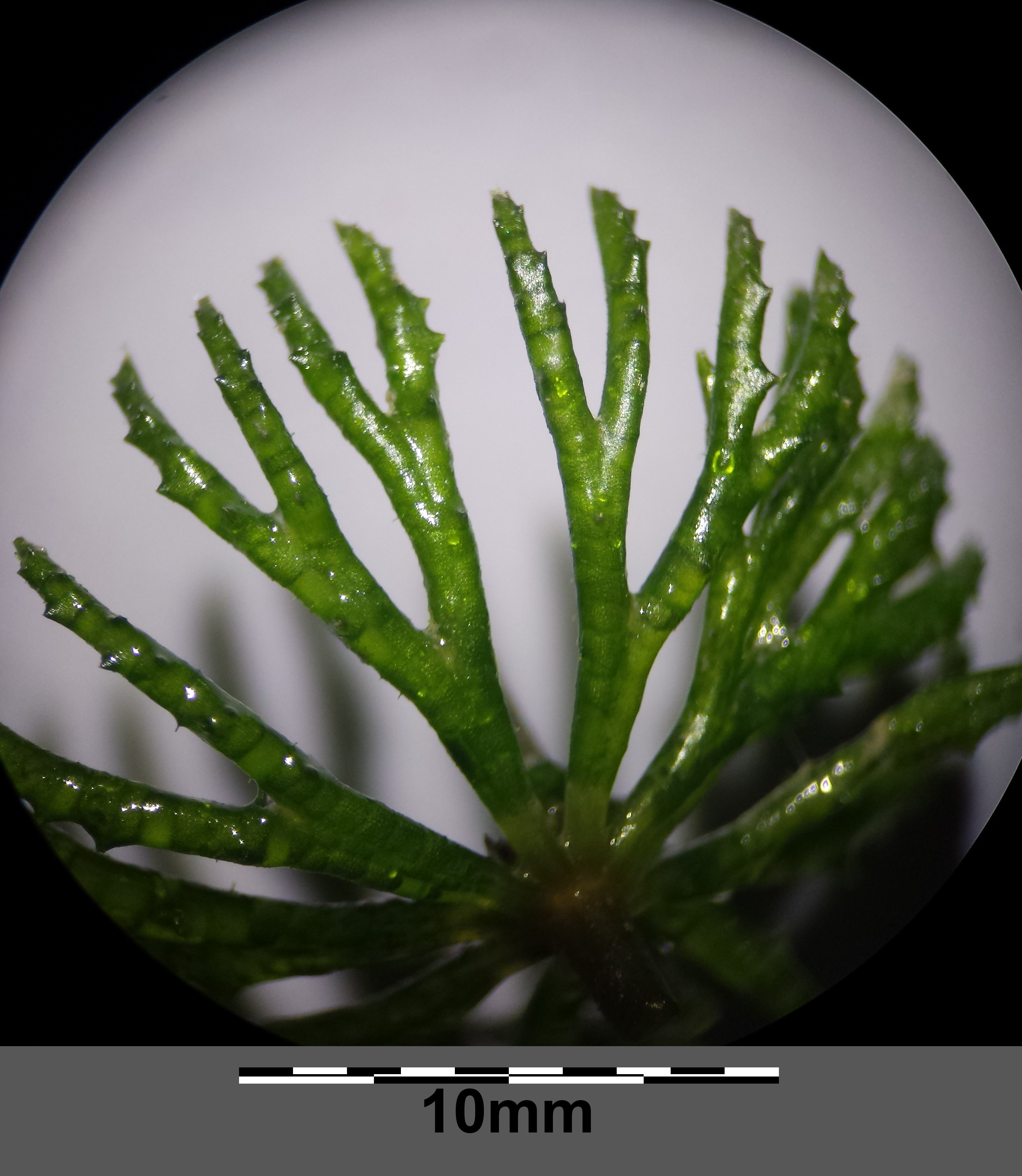
Ceratophyllum

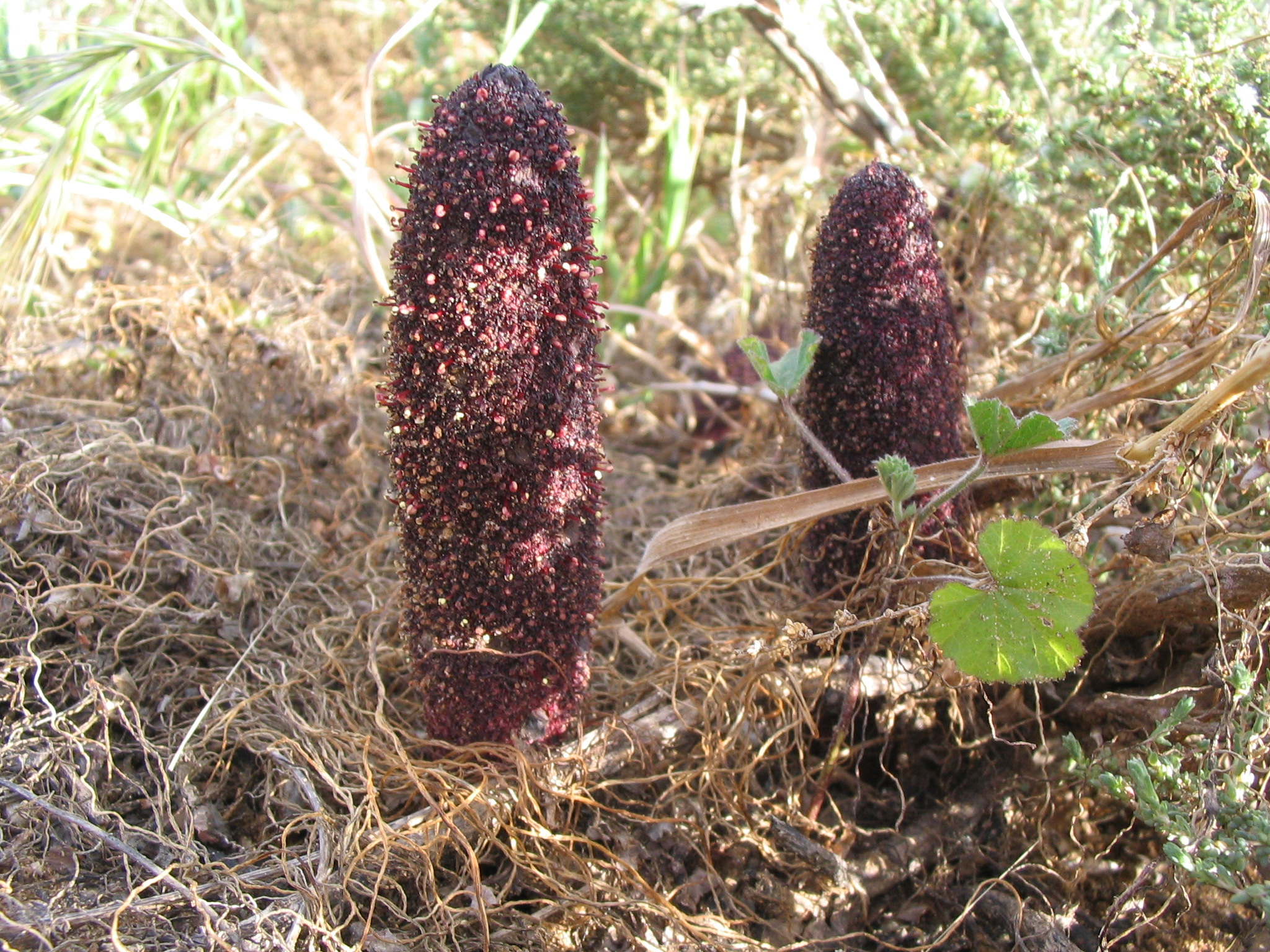
Cynomorium

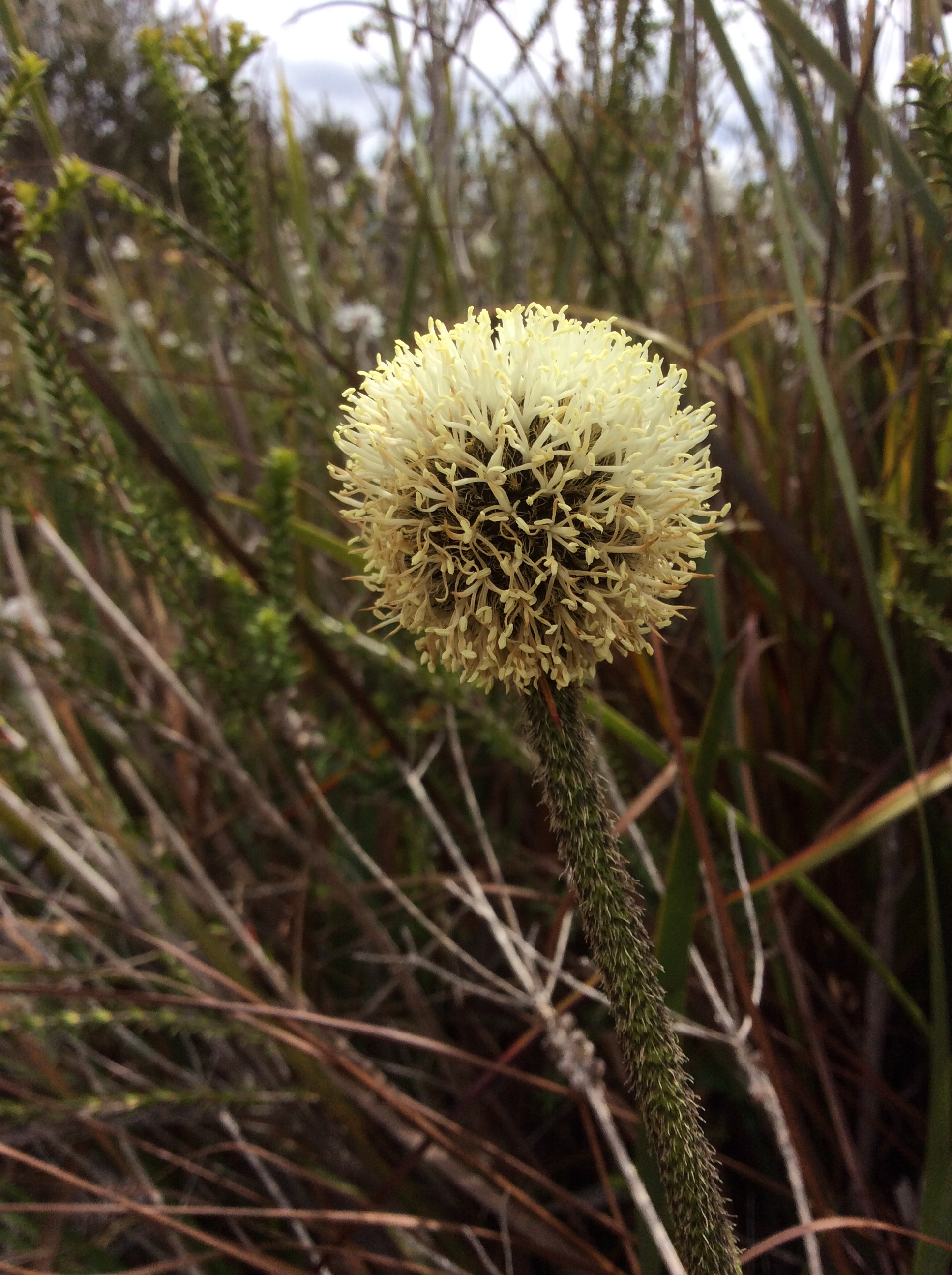
Dasypogon

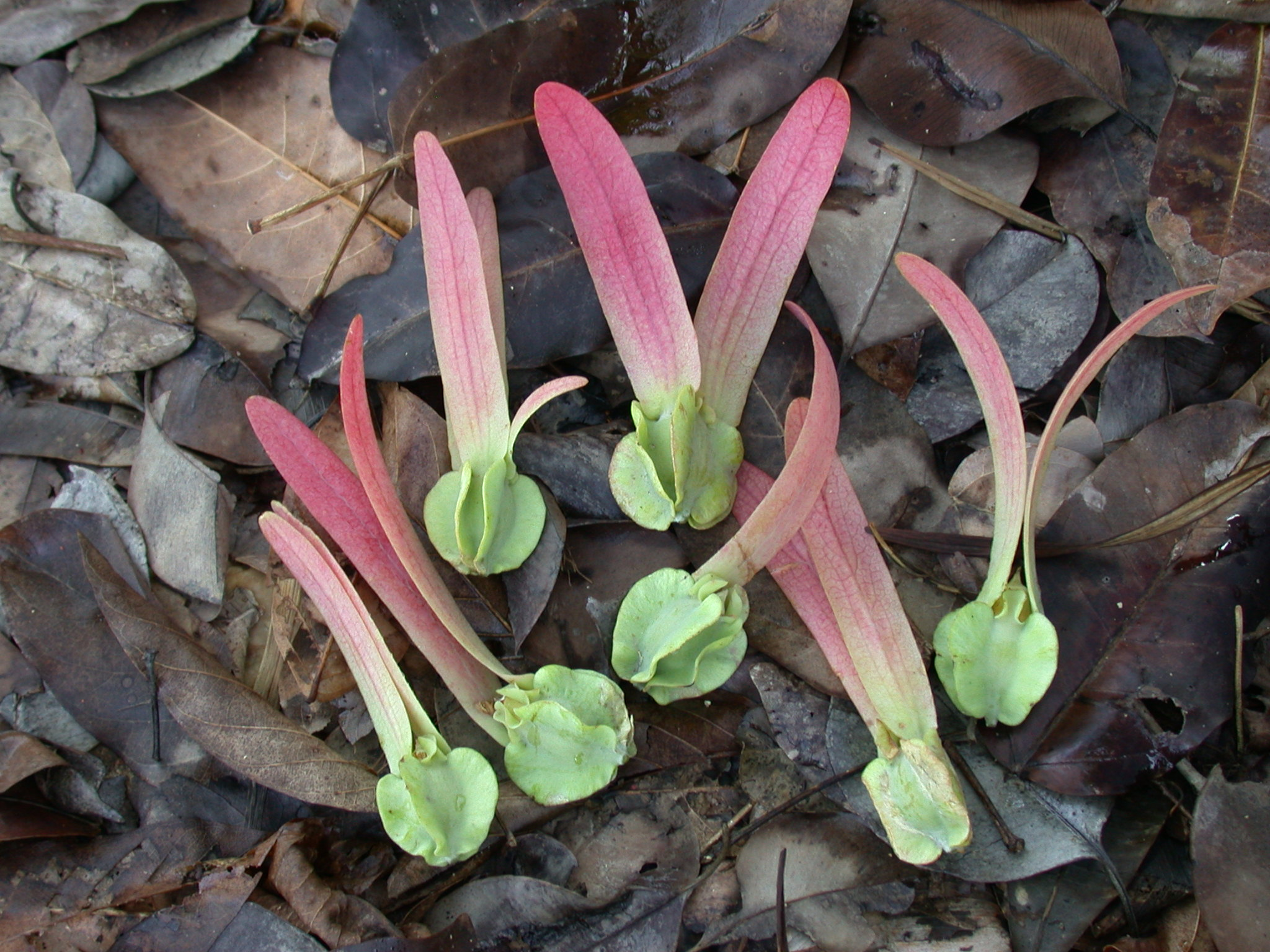
Dipterocarpus

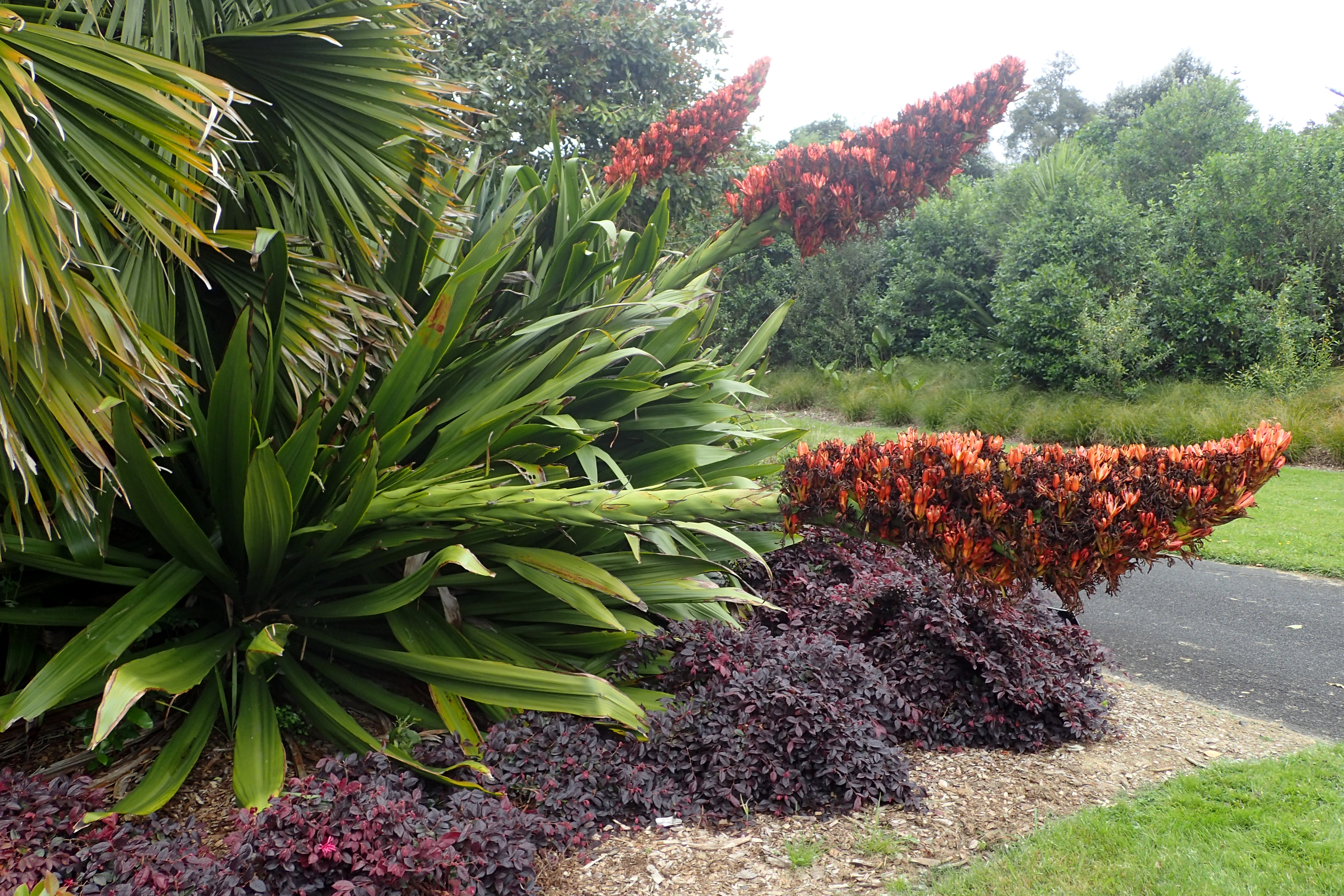
Doryanthes

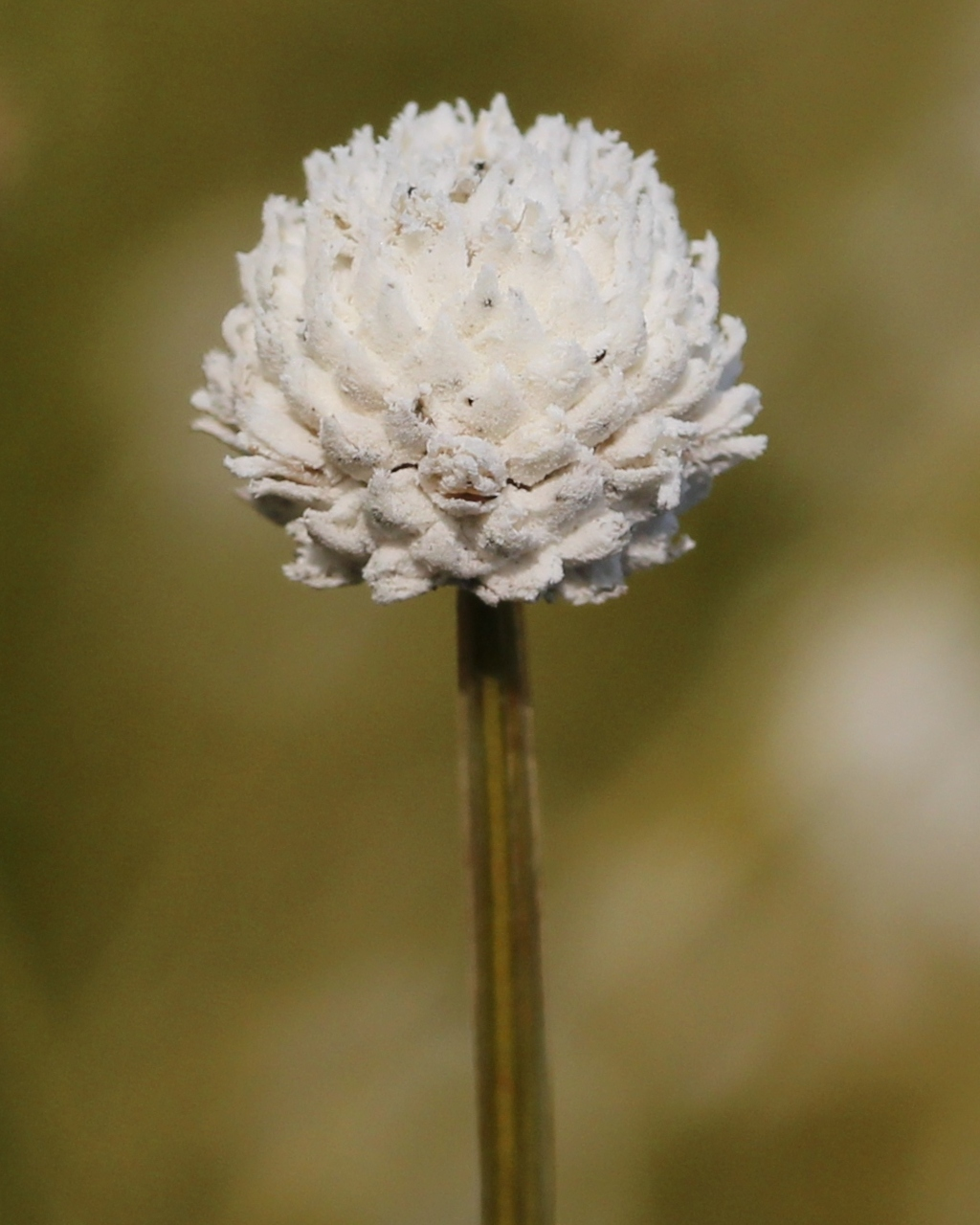
Eriocaulon

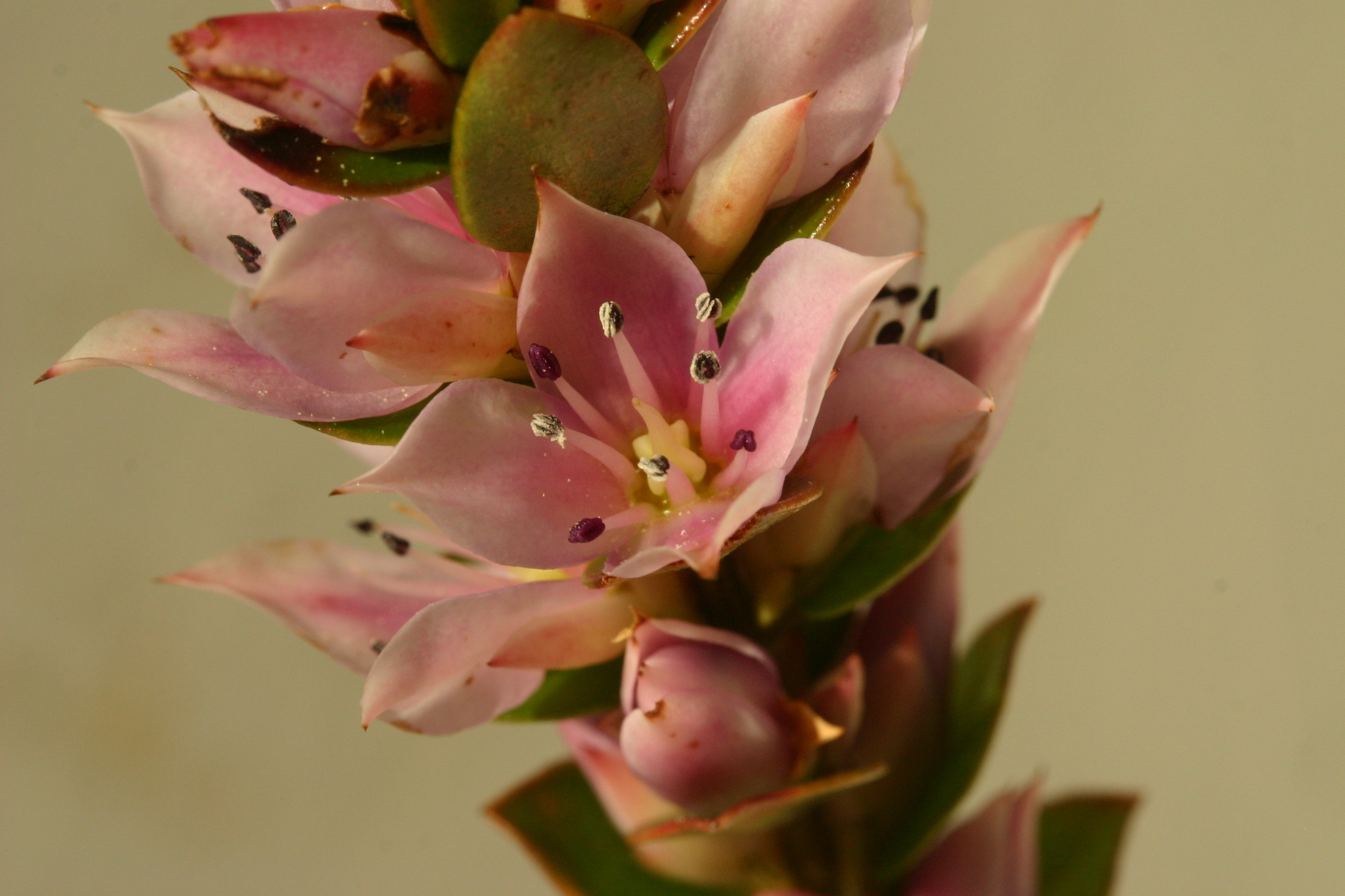
Geissoloma

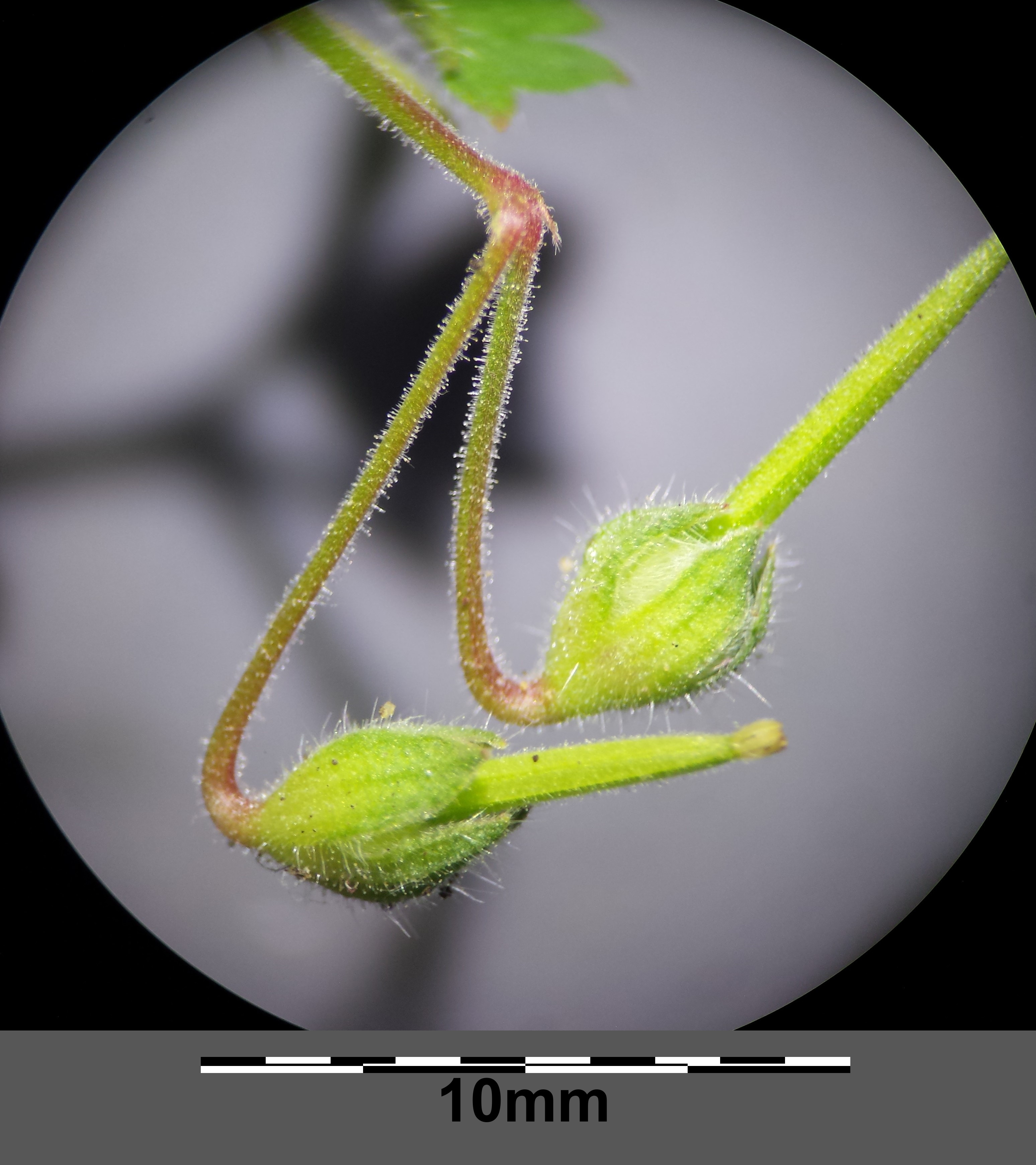
Geranium fruit

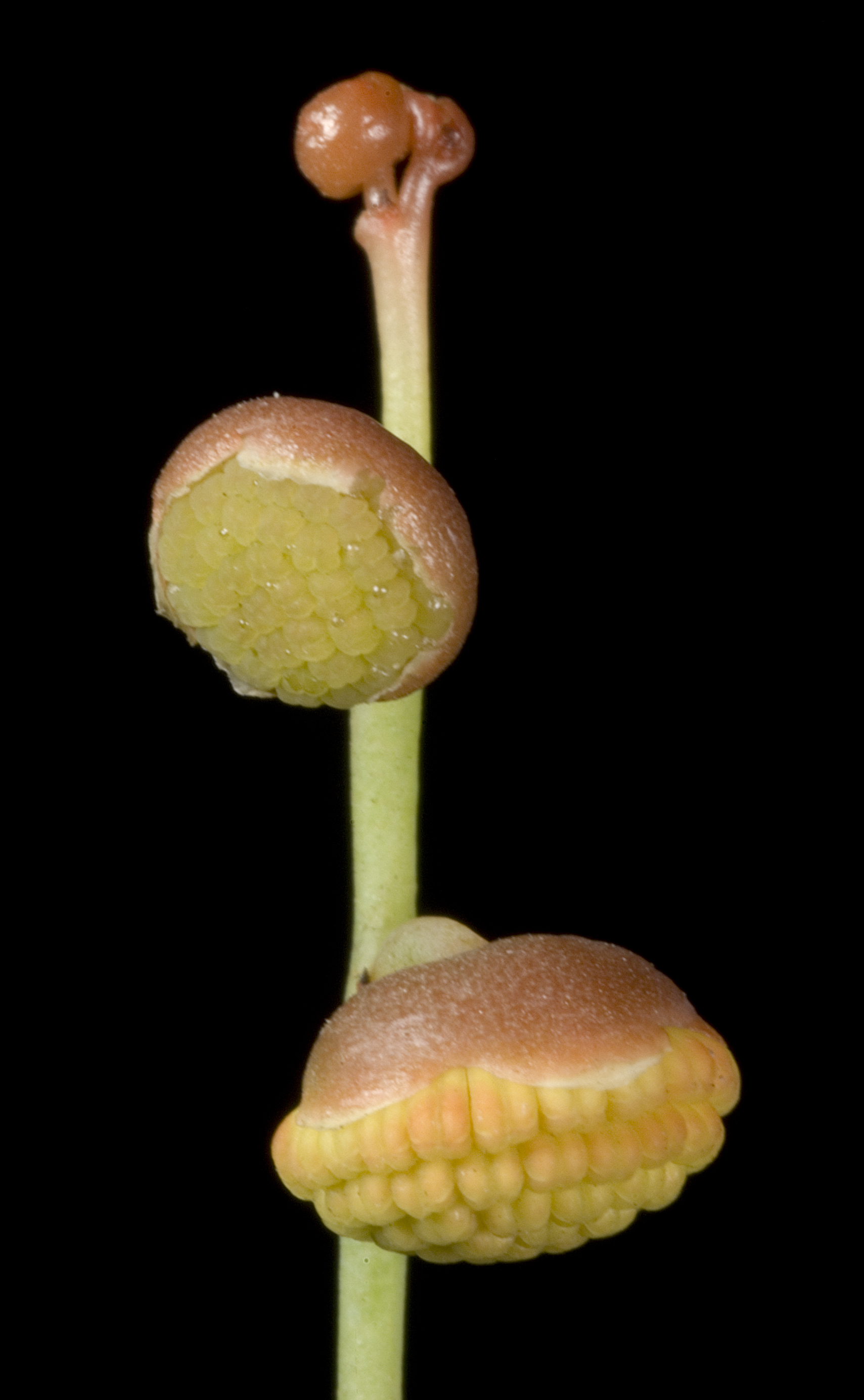
Gyrostemon

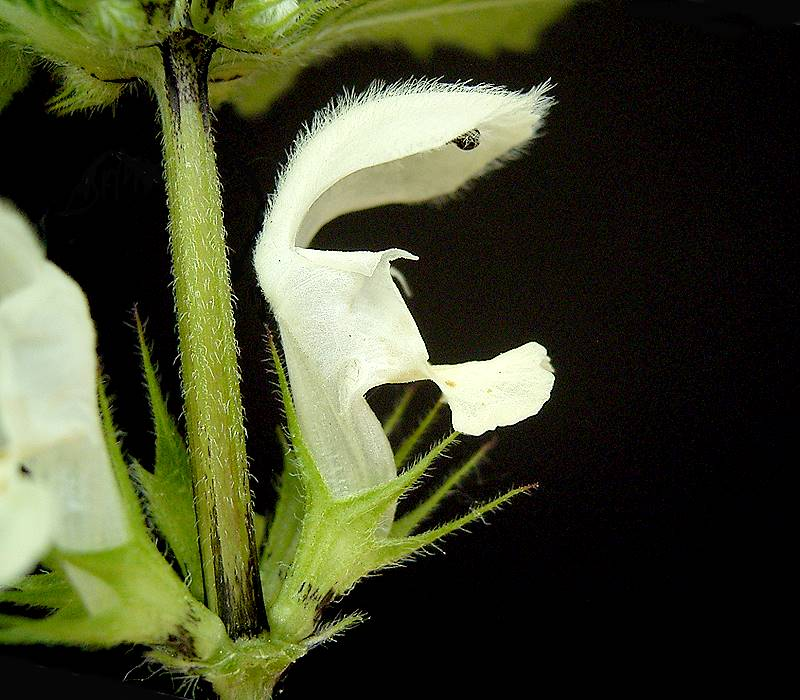
Lamium

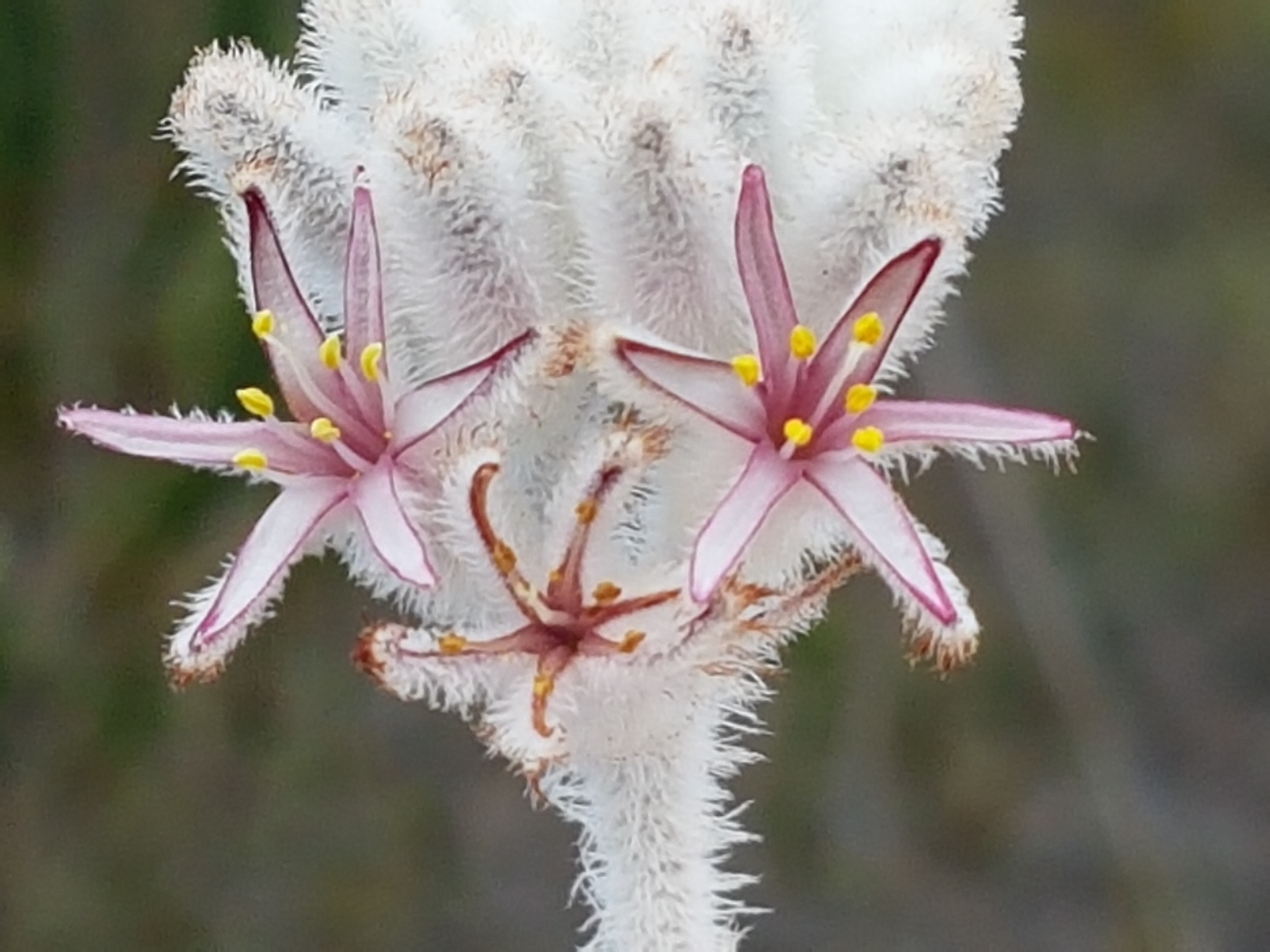
Lanaria

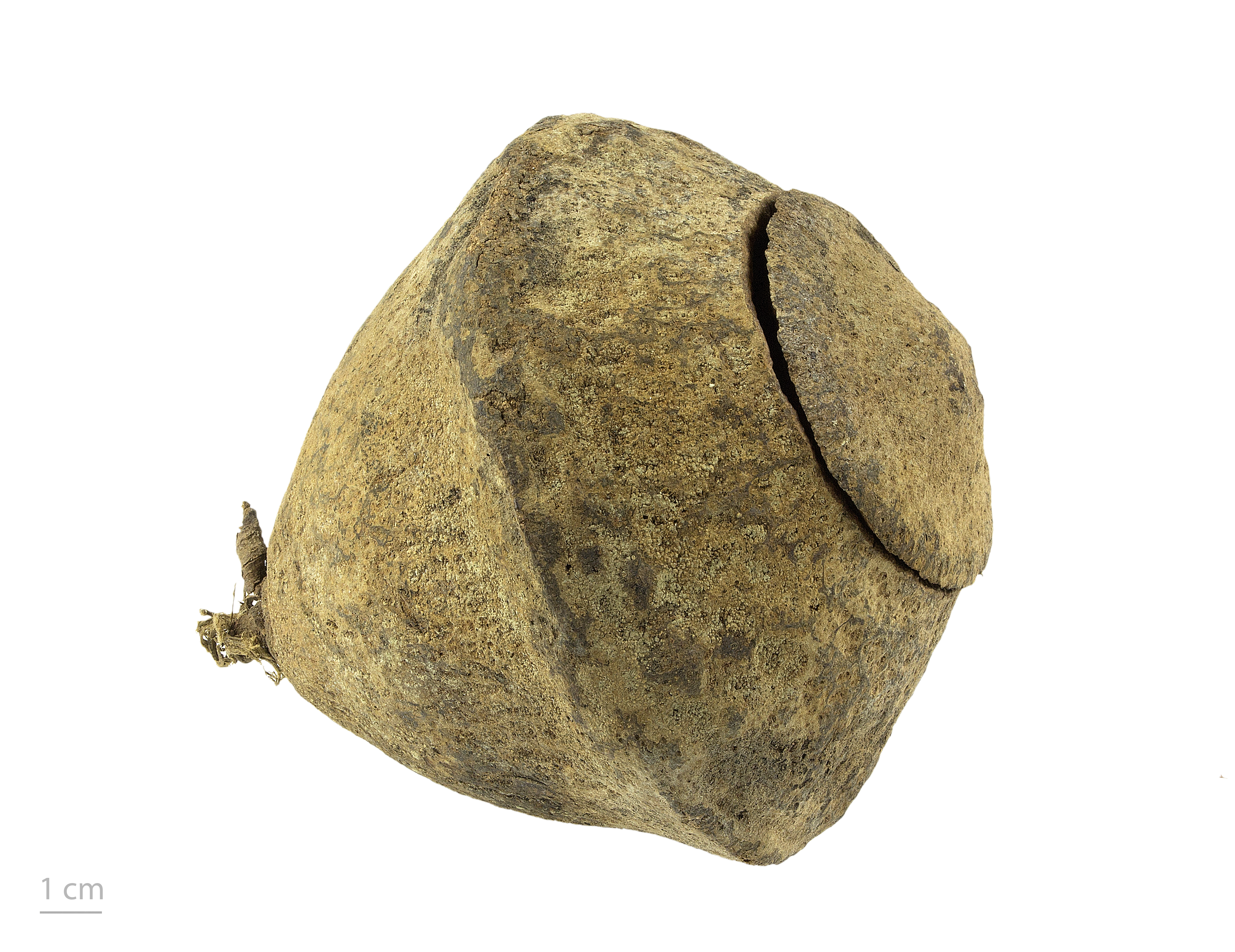
Lecythis fruit

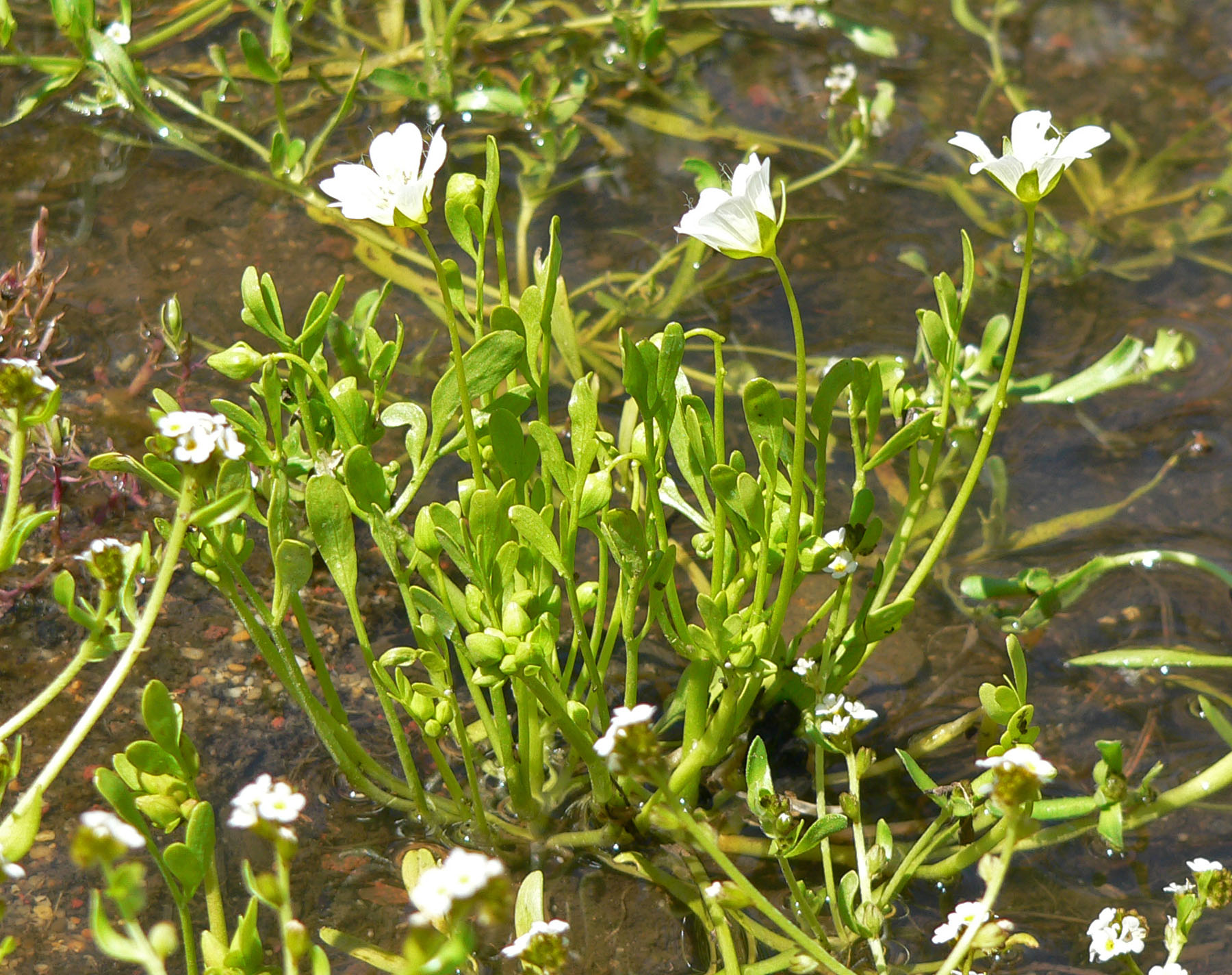
Limnanthes

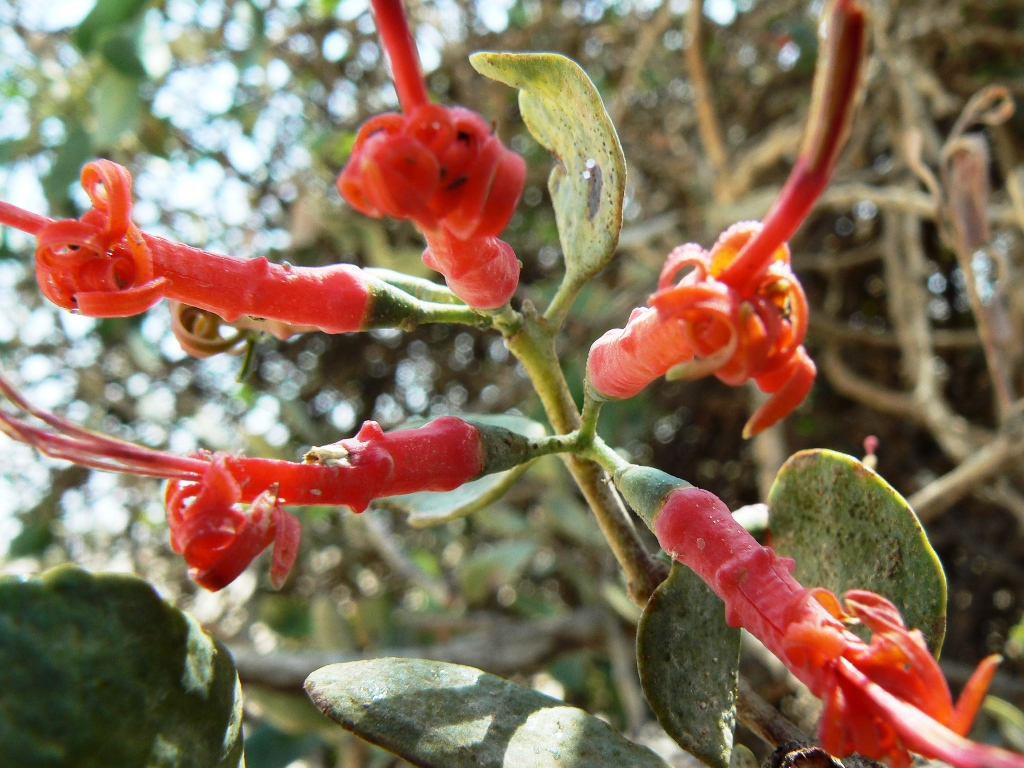
Loranthus

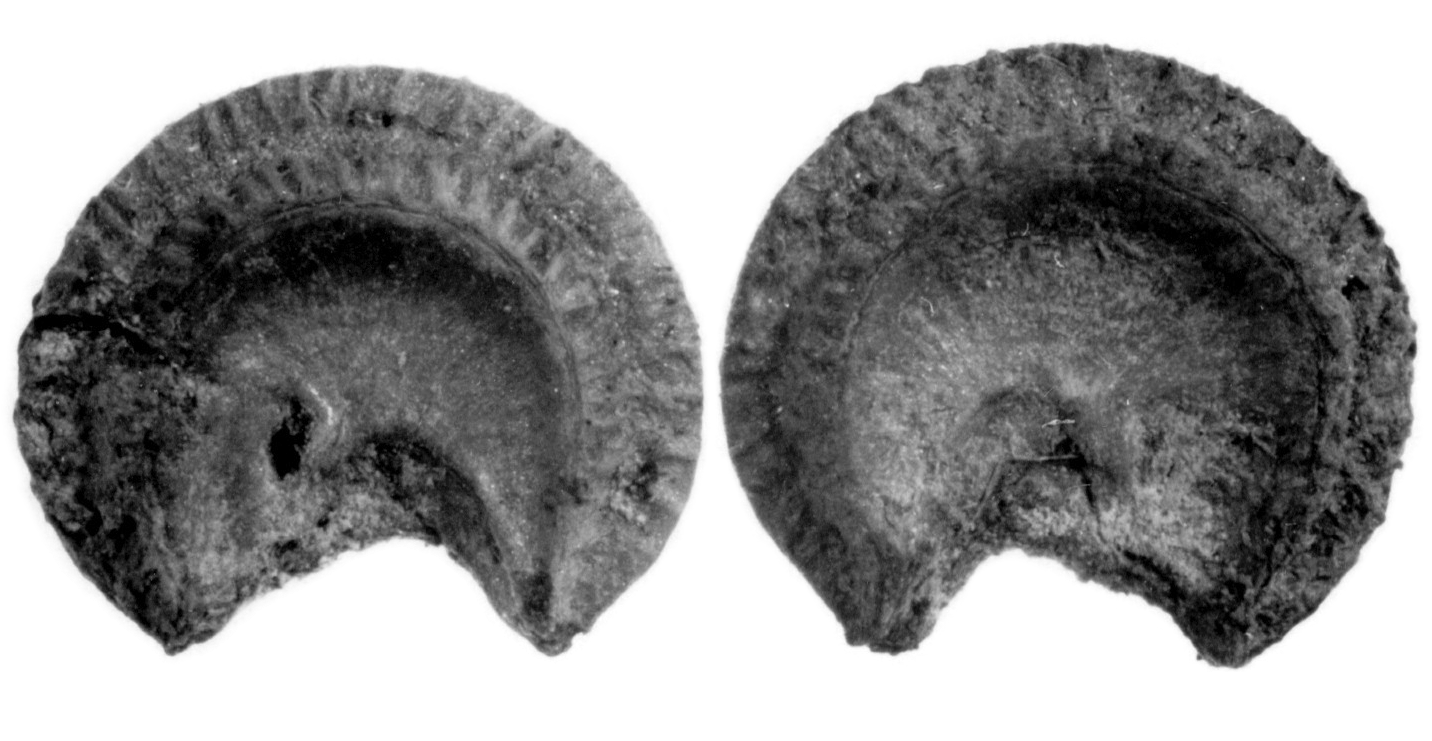
Menispermum seeds

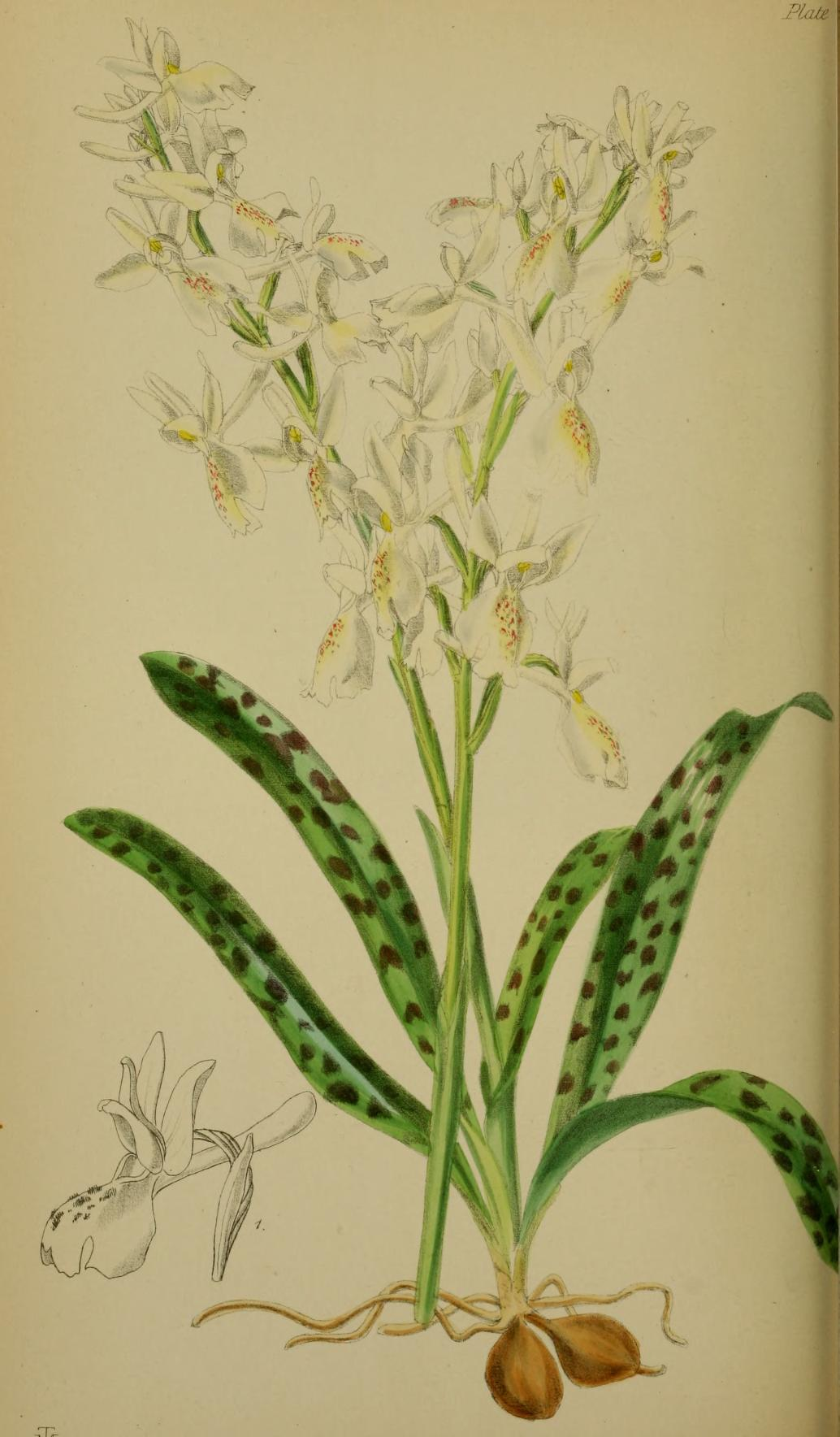
Illustration of Orchis

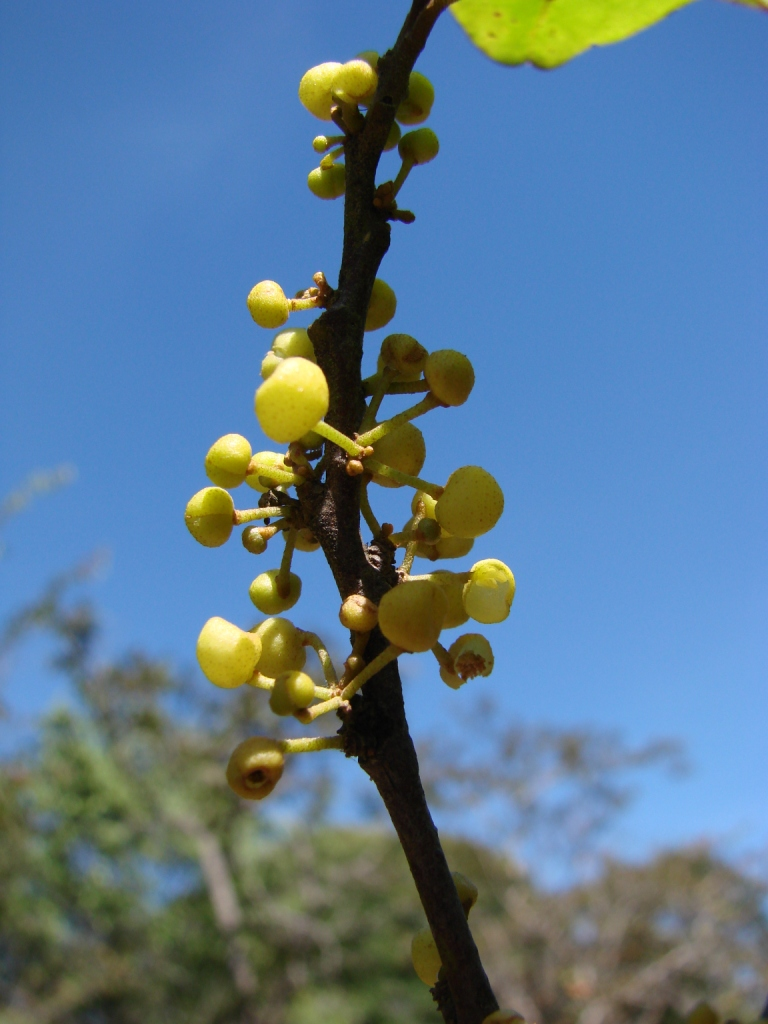
Pera fruit

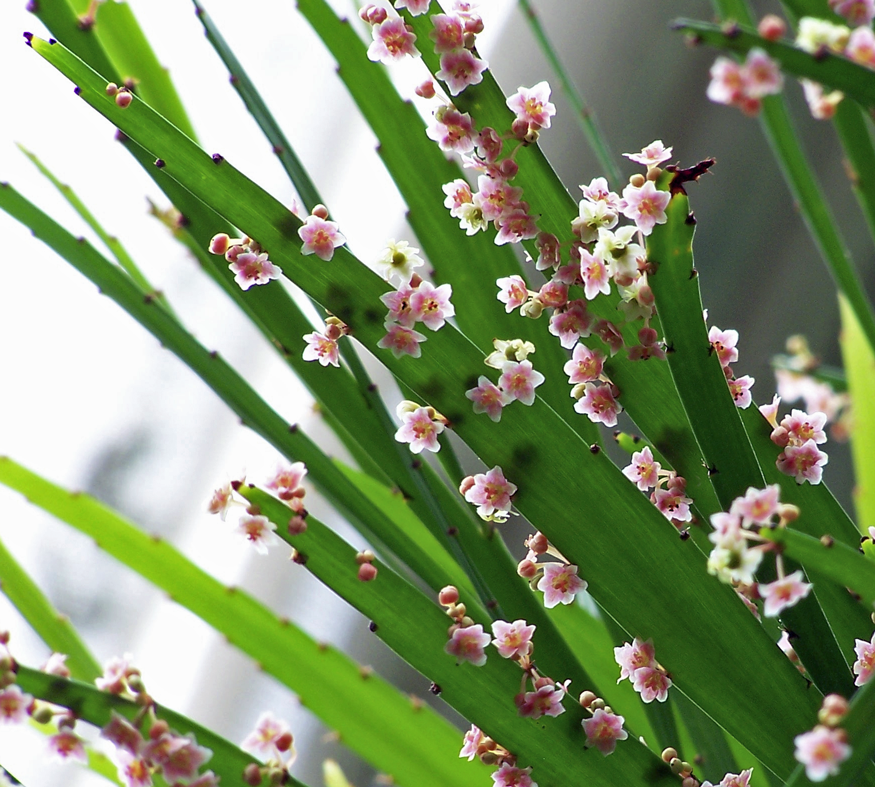
Phyllanthus

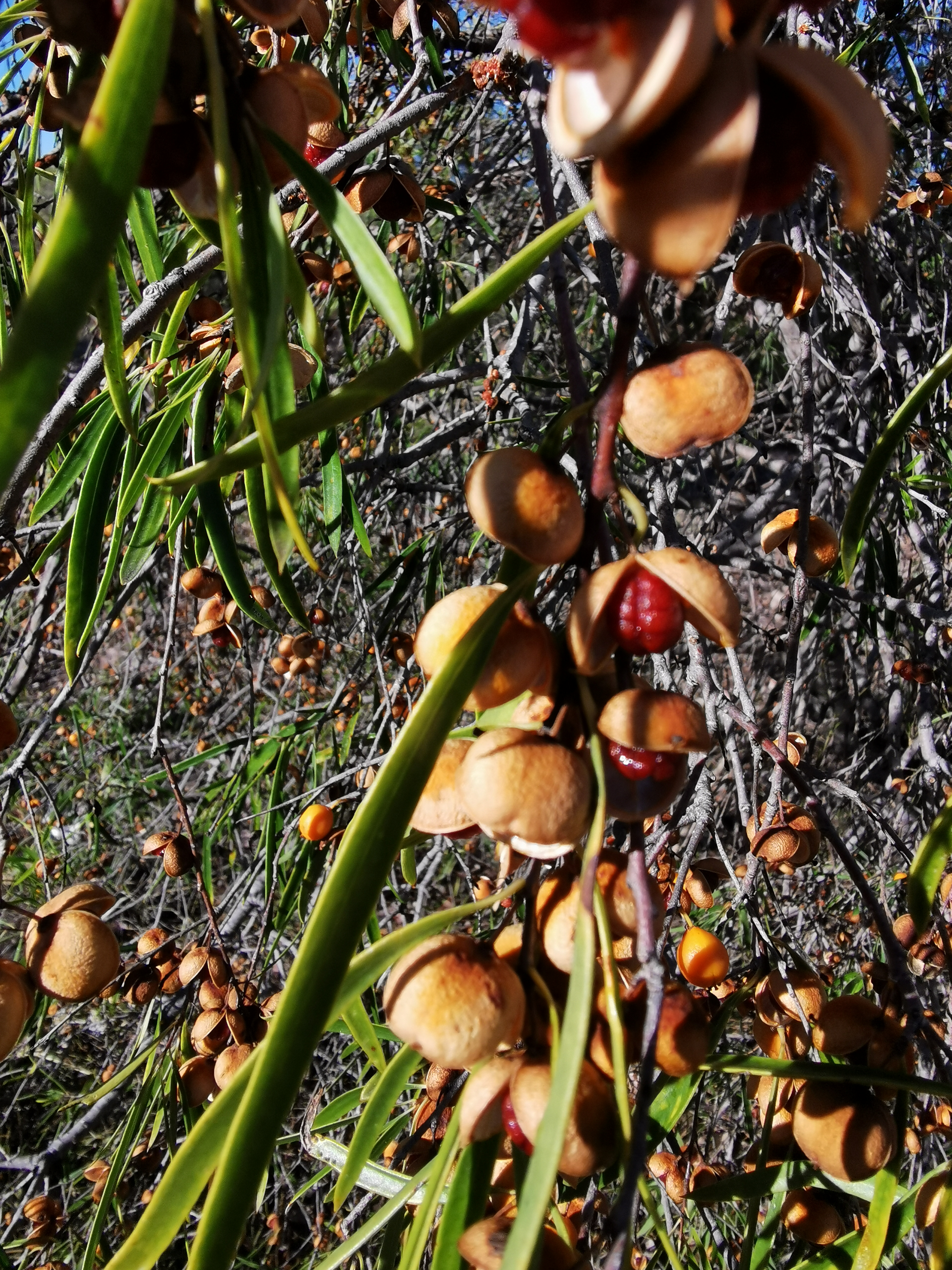
Pittosporum

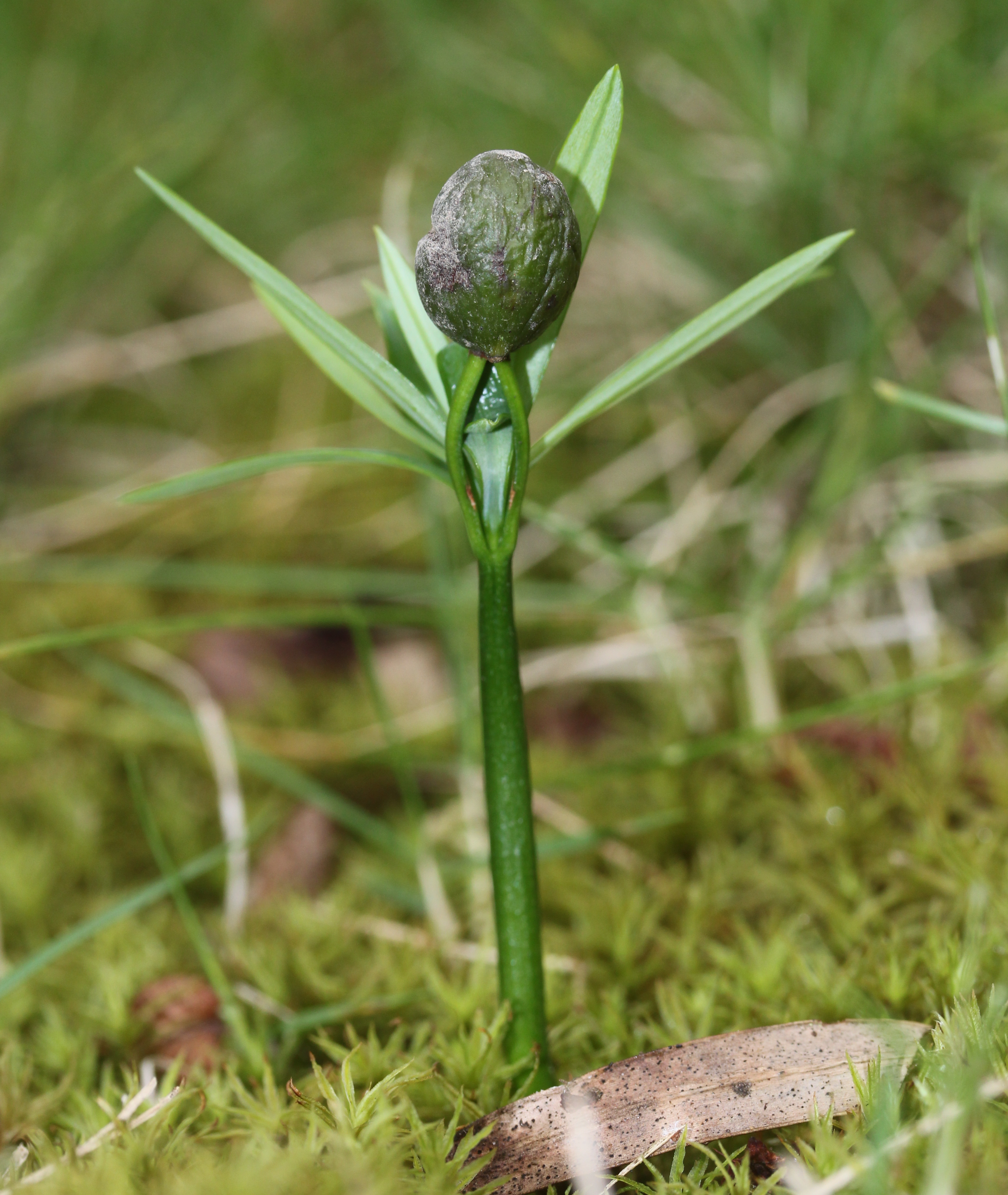
Podocarpus

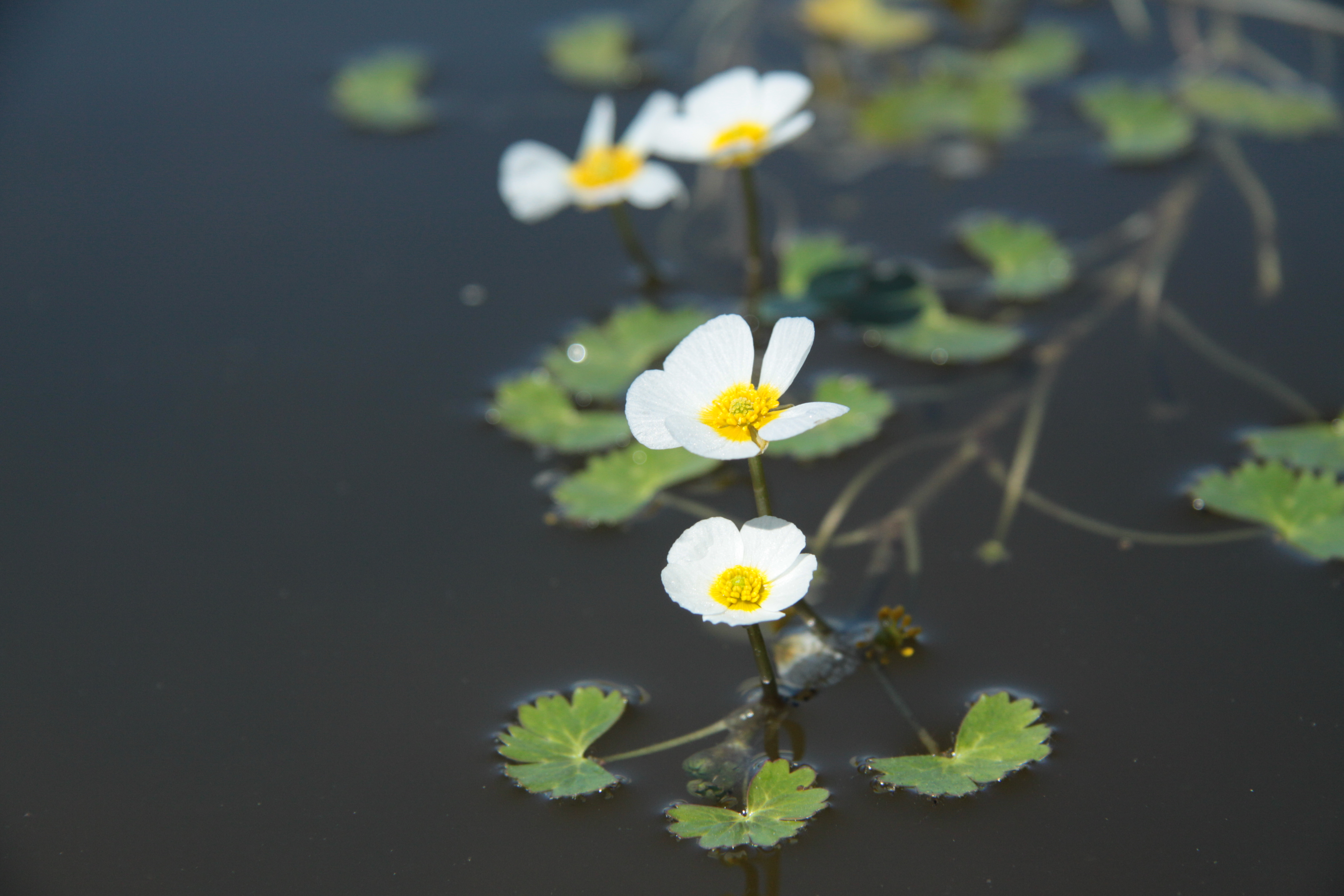
Ranunculus

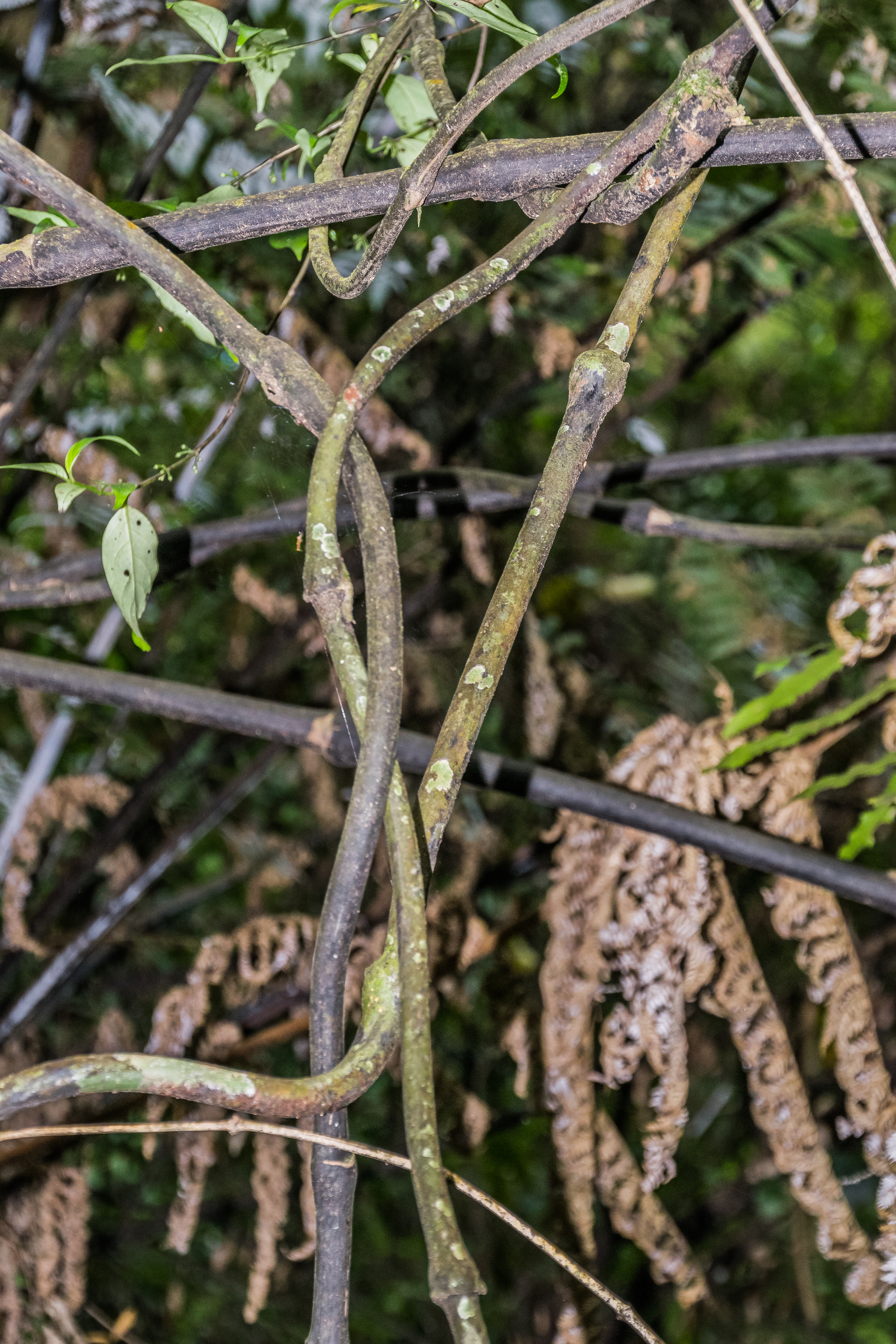
Ripogonum

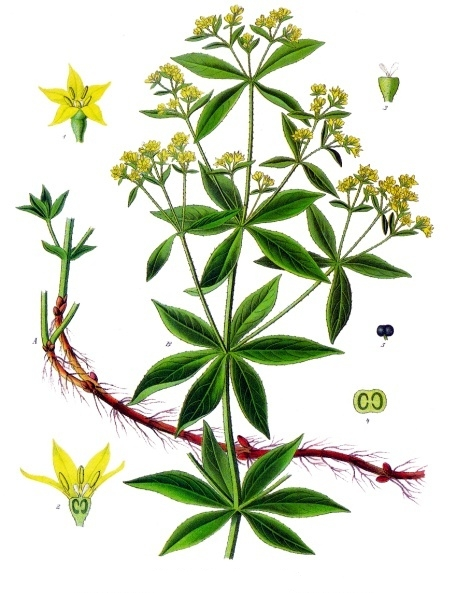
Rubia illustration

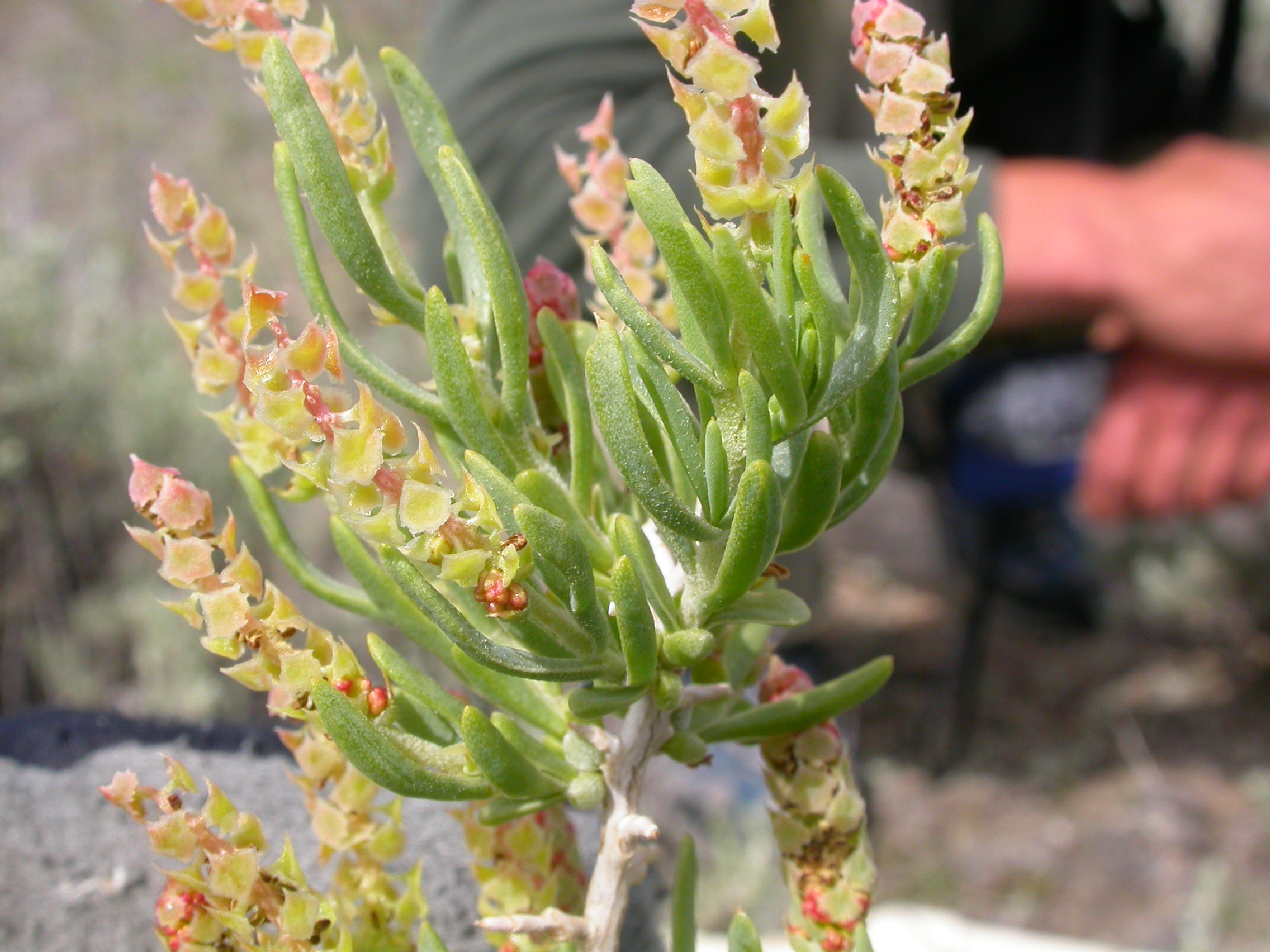
Sarcobatus

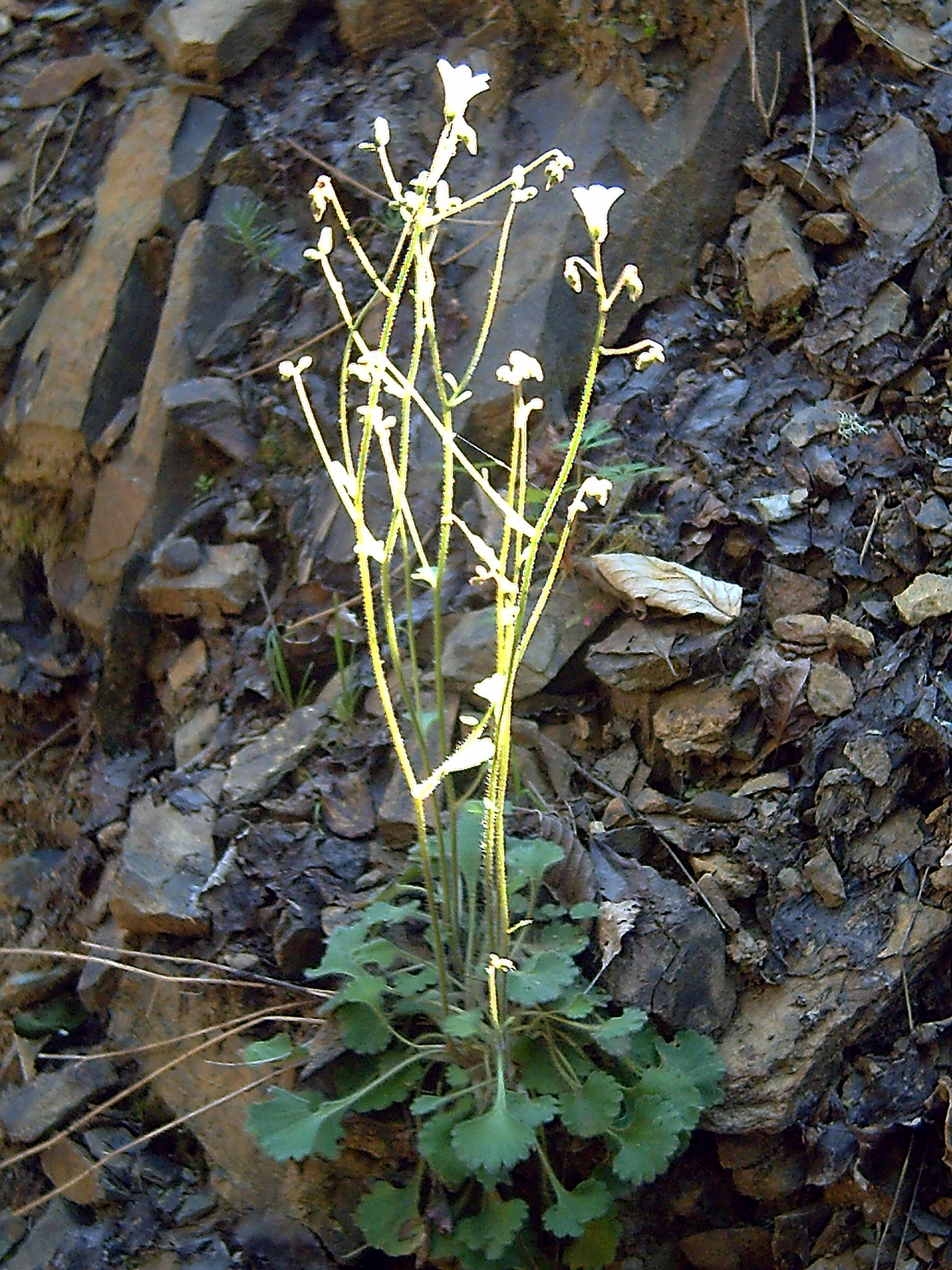
Saxifraga

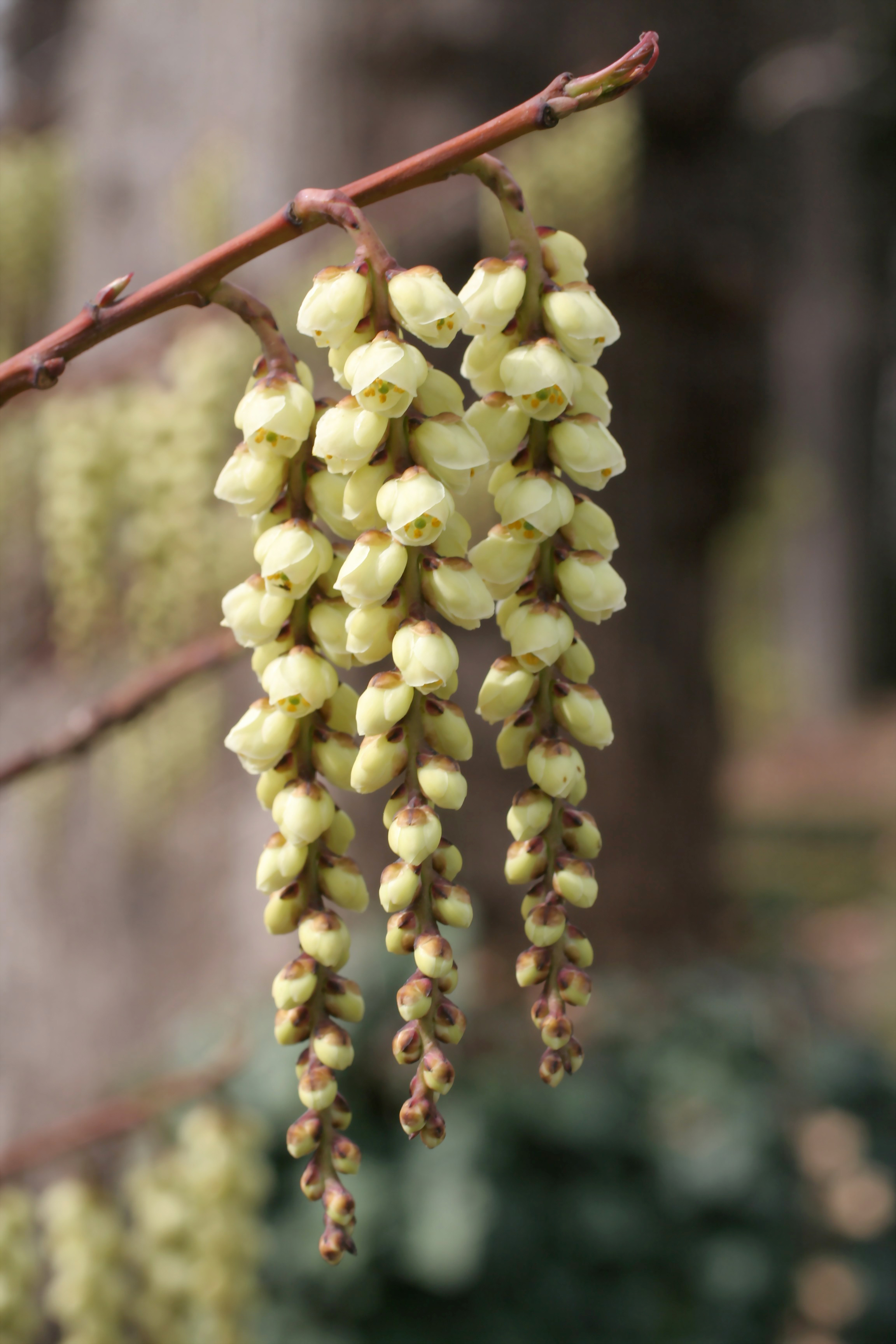
Stachyurus

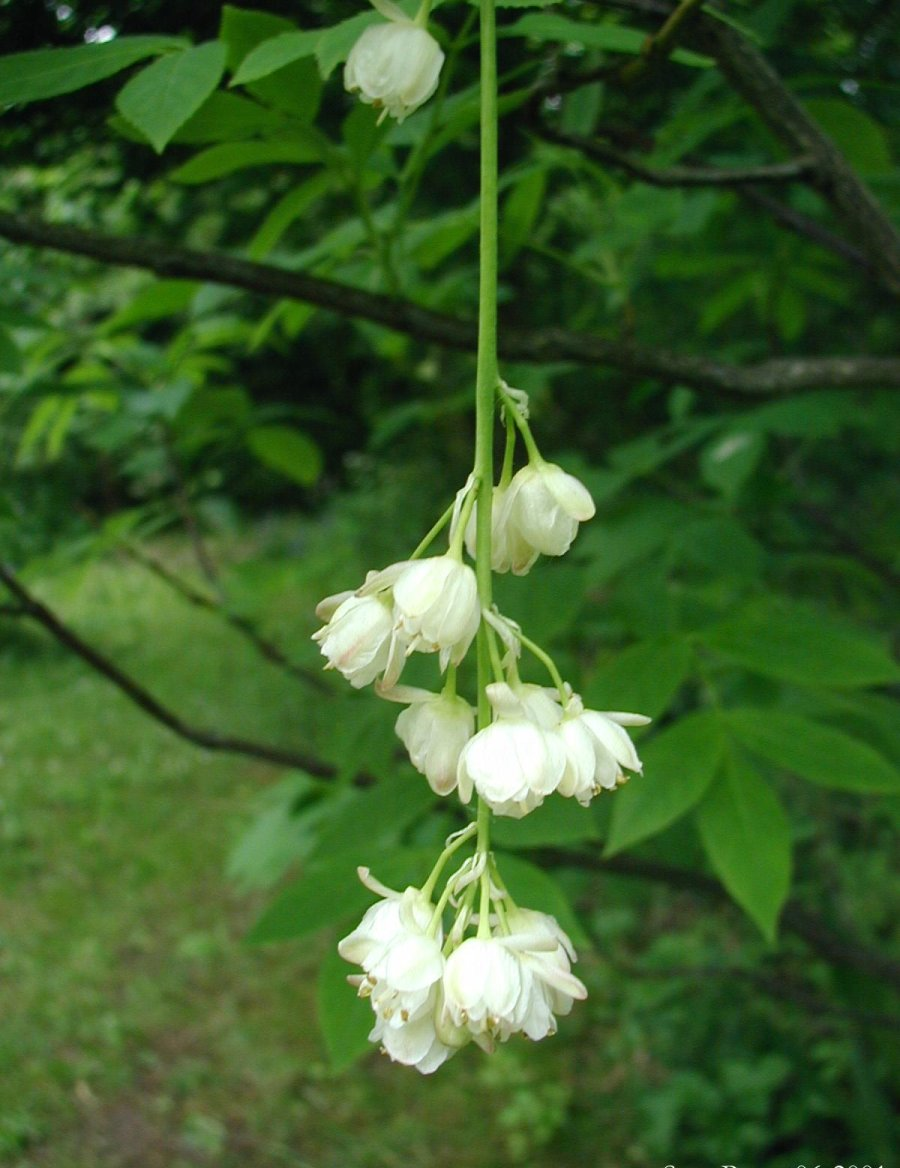
Staphylea

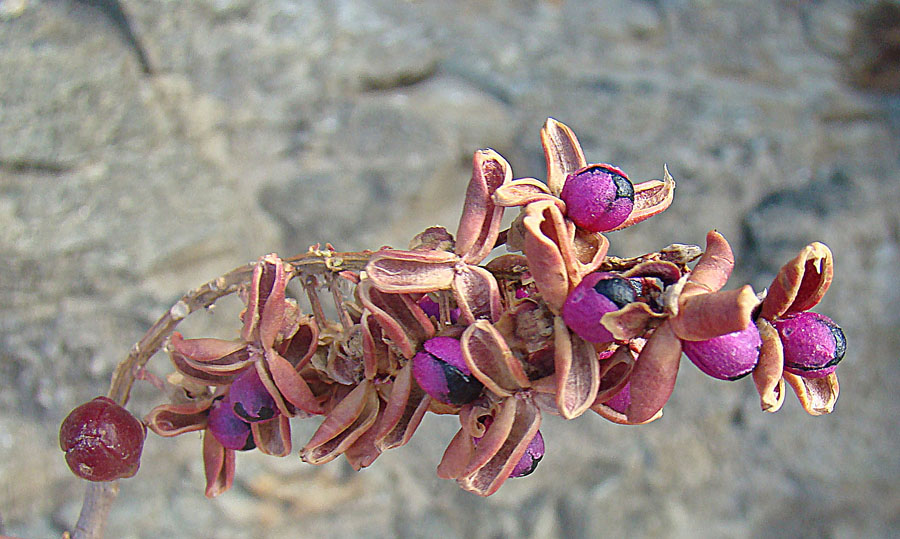
Open pods of Stegnosperma

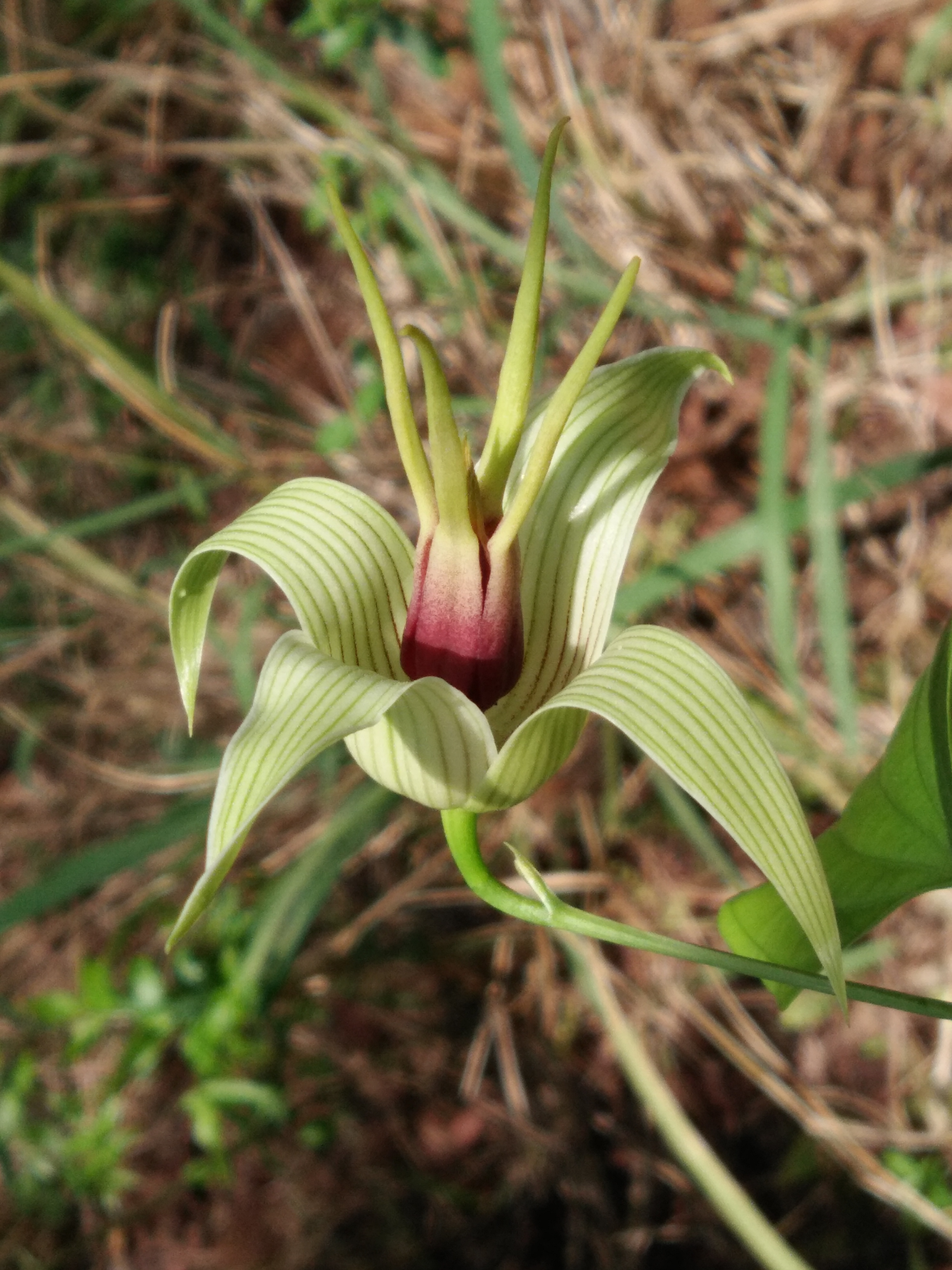
Stemona

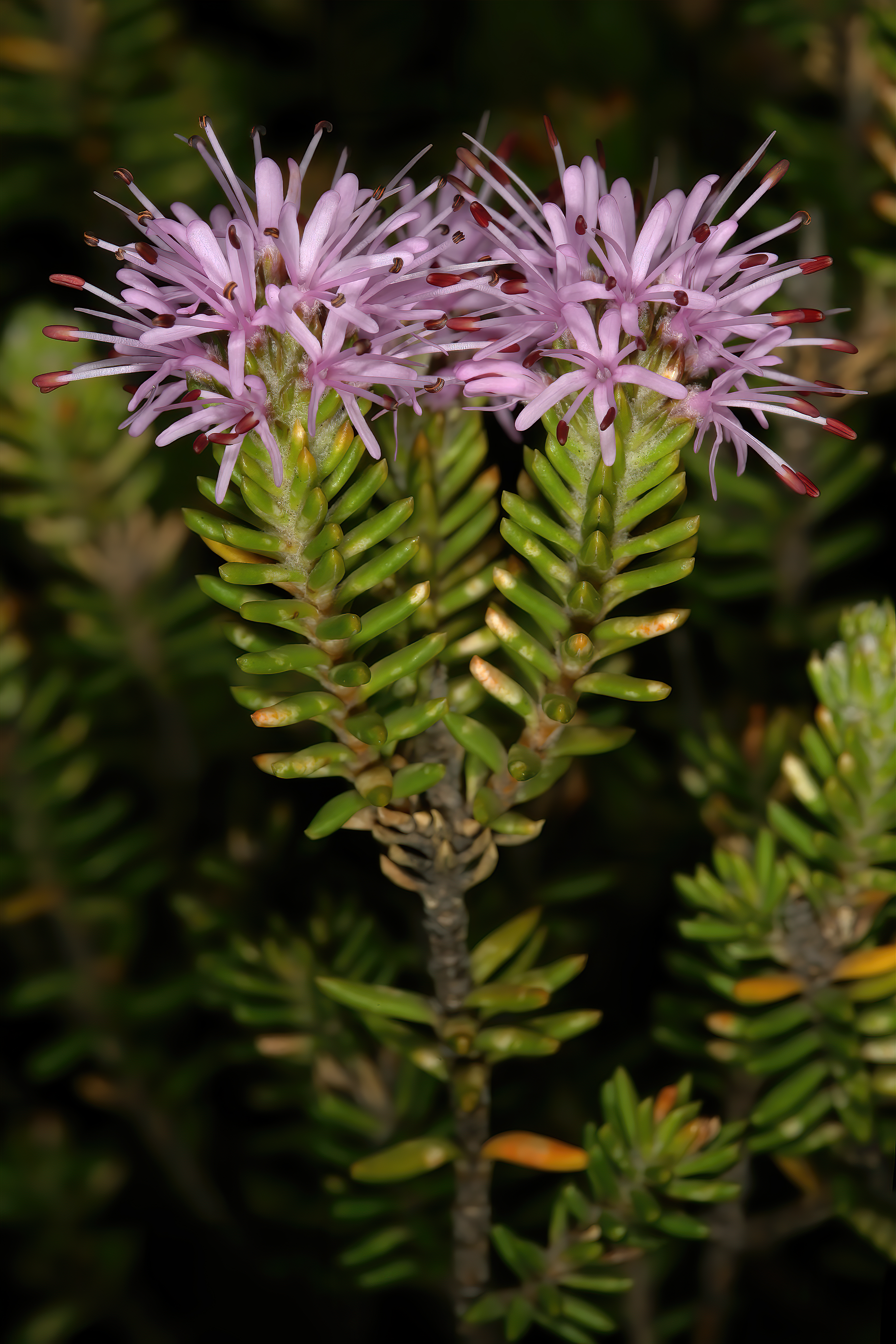
Stilbe

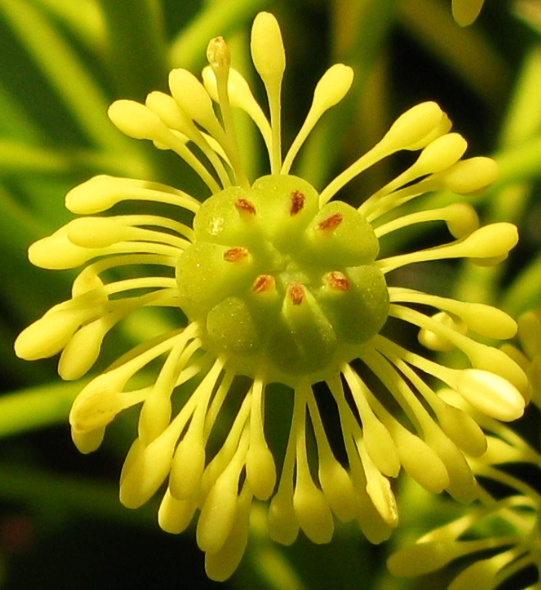
Trochodendron

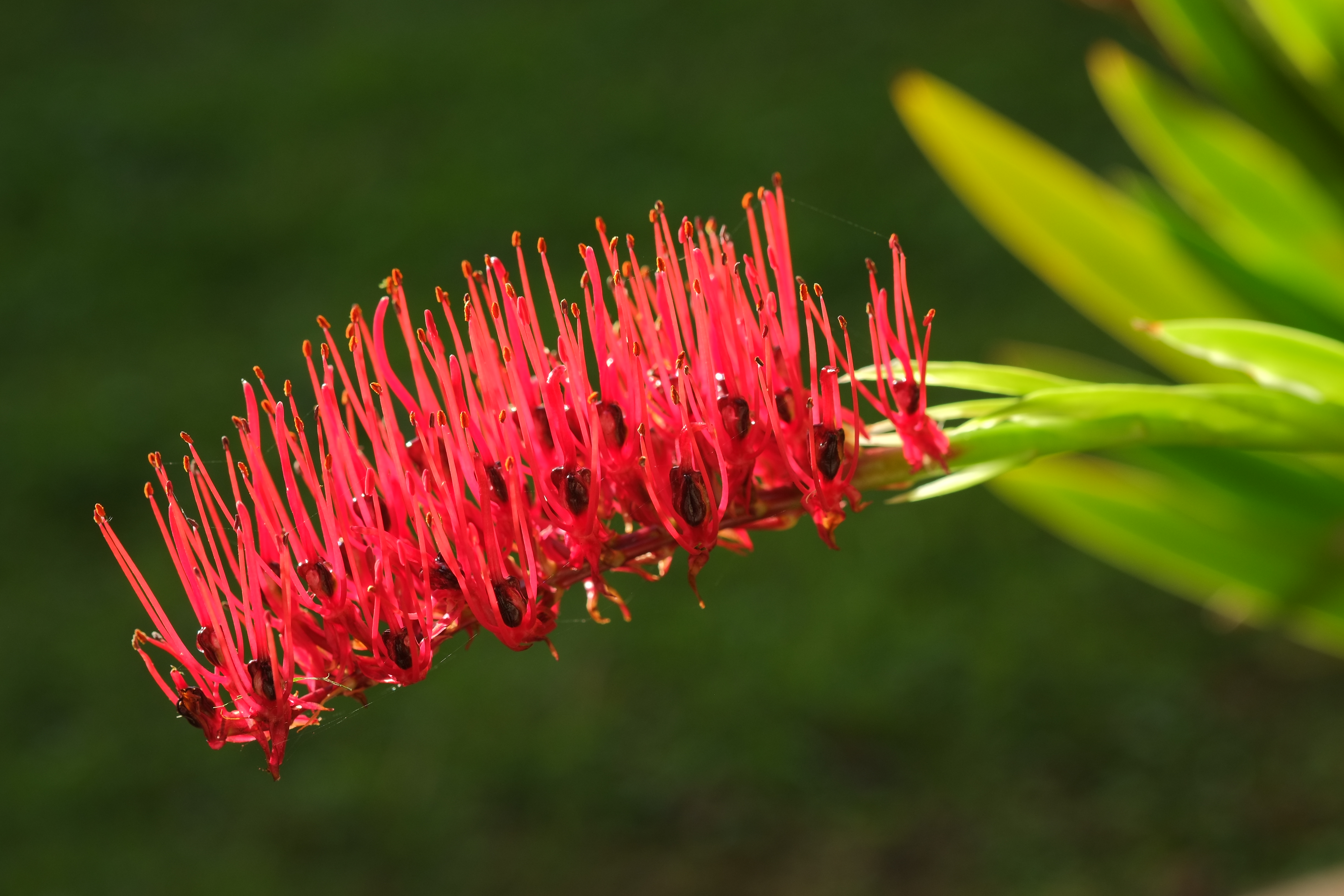
Xeronema

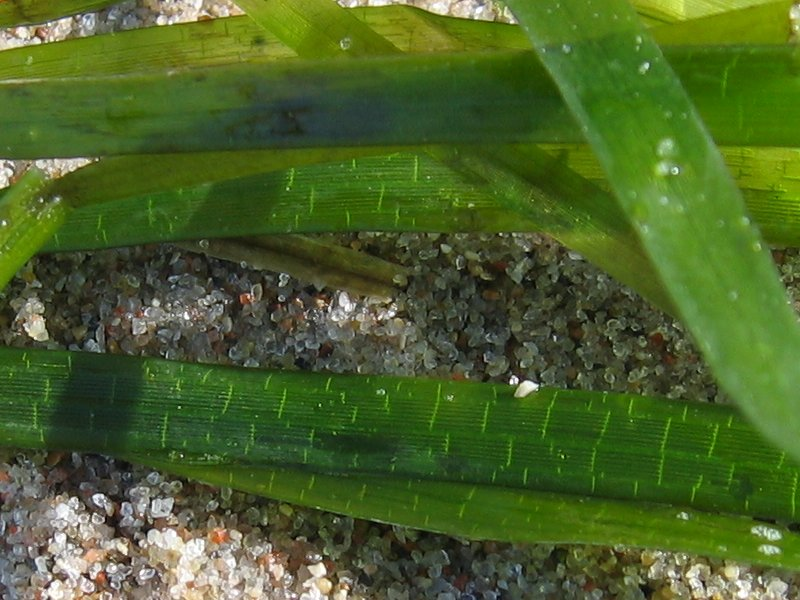
Zostera

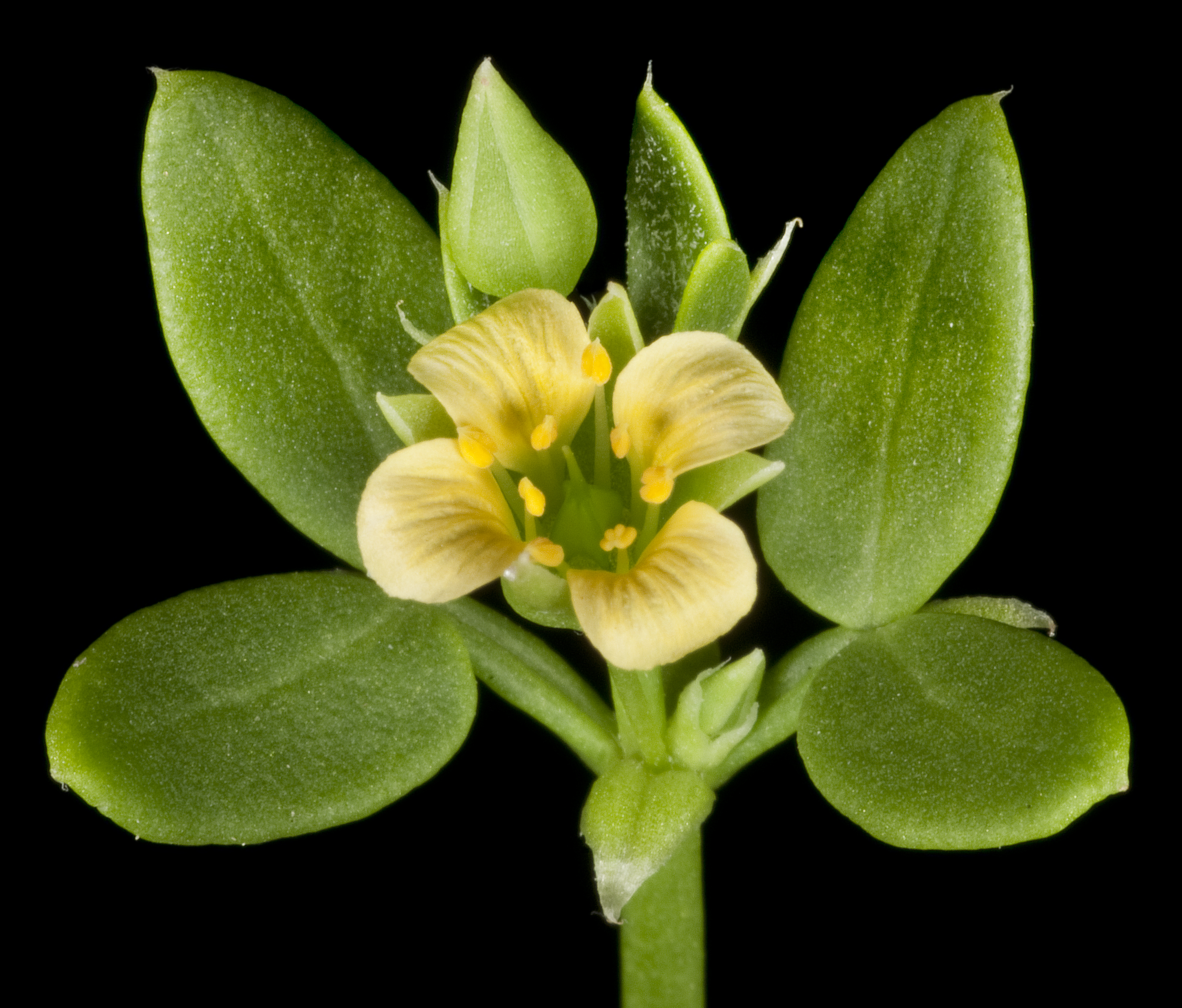
Zygophyllum

Families
Family	Original type genus	LG	Associated meaning, derivation or person (Note: Except for the people with an indication in their name or description that they were known for something else, all are remembered for their work as naturalists, including amateur and professional botanists, zoologists, apothecaries, and collectors.)	Order	Refs
Acanthaceae	Acanthus	G	thorns	Lamiales	CS
Achariaceae	Acharia	P	Erik Acharius (1757–1819)	Malpighiales	Bu
Achatocarpaceae	Achatocarpus	G	agate fruit	Caryophyllales	
Acoraceae	Acorus	L	Latin plant name	Acorales	CS
Actinidiaceae	Actinidia	G	radiating out from the center (the styles)	Ericales	CS
Aextoxicaceae	Aextoxicon	G	goat poison	Berberidopsidales	
Aizoaceae	Aizoon	G	always living (in a variety of habitats)	Caryophyllales	Gl
Akaniaceae	Akania	G	bractless, possibly	Brassicales	
Alismataceae	Alisma	G	Greek plant name	Alismatales	CS
Alseuosmiaceae	Alseuosmia	G	grove fragrance	Asterales	St
Alstroemeriaceae	Alstroemeria	P	Clas Alströmer (1736–1794)	Liliales	
Altingiaceae	—	P	Willem Arnold Alting (1724–1800), colonial administrator	Saxifragales	Bu
Alzateaceae	Alzatea	P	José Antonio de Alzate y Ramírez (d. 1795), cartographer	Myrtales	
Amaranthaceae	Amaranthus	G	unfading	Caryophyllales	CS
Amaryllidaceae	Amaryllis	G	Amaryllis, a Greek shepherdess from classical poetry	Asparagales	CS
Amborellaceae	Amborella	–	Malagasy plant name	Amborellales	
Anacampserotaceae	Anacampseros	G	Greek plant name	Caryophyllales	St
Anacardiaceae	Anacardium	G	Greek plant name	Sapindales	St
Ancistrocladaceae	Ancistrocladus	G	fish-hooked branches	Caryophyllales	
Anisophylleaceae	Anisophyllea	G	unequal leaves	Cucurbitales	
Annonaceae	Annona	–	Taíno plant name	Magnoliales	St
Aphanopetalaceae	Aphanopetalum	G	inconspicuous petals	Saxifragales	Gl
Aphloiaceae	Aphloia	G	unbarked	Crossosomatales	
Apiaceae	Apium	L	Latin plant name	Apiales	CS
Apocynaceae	Apocynum	G	Greek plant name	Gentianales	St
Apodanthaceae	Apodanthes	G	stalkless flowers	Cucurbitales	Qu
Aponogetonaceae	Aponogeton	L	near (hot springs at) Aponus (now Abano Terme) (Note: Present-day geographical names are used wherever possible.)	Alismatales	St
Aquifoliaceae	—	L	Latin plant name	Aquifoliales	
Araceae	Arum	L	Greek and Latin plant name	Alismatales	CS
Araliaceae	Aralia	–	French-Canadian plant name	Apiales	CS
Araucariaceae	Araucaria	–	Araucanos (now Mapuche)	Pinales	CS
Arecaceae	Areca	–	Malabar plant name	Arecales	St
Argophyllaceae	Argophyllum	G	silver leaves	Asterales	
Aristolochiaceae	Aristolochia	G	best childbirth (for which some species used to be prescribed)	Piperales	CS
Asparagaceae	Asparagus	L	Latin plant name	Asparagales	CS
Asphodelaceae	Asphodeline	G	like Asphodelus	Asparagales	CS
Asteliaceae	Astelia	G	trunkless	Asparagales	Ba
Asteraceae	Aster	L	star	Asterales	CS
Asteropeiaceae	Asteropeia	G	Asteropeia, daughter of the mythological king Pelias	Caryophyllales	Bu
Atherospermataceae	Atherosperma	G	awned seeds, or a reference to the fruit	Laurales	St
Austrobaileyaceae	Austrobaileya	P	Frederick Manson Bailey (1827–1915) and Irving Widmer Bailey (1884–1967)	Austrobaileyales	
Balanopaceae	Balanops	G	acorn-like	Malpighiales	
Balanophoraceae	Balanophora	G	acorn-bearing (the shape of the male flower heads)	Santalales	
Balsaminaceae	—	G	Greek plant name	Ericales	Gl
Barbeuiaceae	Barbeuia	P	Jacques Barbeu-Dubourg (1709–1779)	Caryophyllales	
Barbeyaceae	Barbeya	P	William Barbey (1842–1914)	Rosales	
Basellaceae	Basella	–	Malabar plant name	Caryophyllales	St
Bataceae	Batis	G	walking	Brassicales	
Begoniaceae	Begonia	P	Michel Bégon (1638–1710), government official and plant collector	Cucurbitales	
Berberidaceae	Berberis	–	Arabic plant name	Ranunculales	CS
Berberidopsidaceae	Berberidopsis	–	like Berberis	Berberidopsidales	CS
Betulaceae	Betula	L	Latin plant name	Fagales	CS
Biebersteiniaceae	Biebersteinia	P	Friedrich August Marschall von Bieberstein (1768–1826)	Sapindales	
Bignoniaceae	Bignonia	P	Jean-Paul Bignon (1662–1743), statesman and royal librarian	Lamiales	
Bixaceae	Bixa	–	Carib plant name	Malvales	St
Blandfordiaceae	Blandfordia	P	George Spencer-Churchill, 5th Duke of Marlborough (1766–1840)	Asparagales	
Bonnetiaceae	Bonnetia	P	Charles Bonnet (1720–1793)	Malpighiales	
Boraginaceae	Borago	L	hairy clothes, possibly (the leaves)	Boraginales	CS
Boryaceae	Borya	P	Jean Baptiste Bory de Saint-Vincent (1778–1846)	Asparagales	Bu
Brassicaceae	Brassica	L	Latin plant name	Brassicales	CS
Bromeliaceae	Bromelia	P	Olof Bromelius (1639–1705), Swedish doctor and botanist	Poales	
Brunelliaceae	Brunellia	P	Gabriele Brunelli (1728–1797), Italian clergyman and botanist	Oxalidales	
Bruniaceae	Brunia	P	Alexander Brown (fl. 1692–1698), English doctor and plant collector	Bruniales	Qu
Burmanniaceae	Burmannia	P	Johannes Burman (1707–1780)	Dioscoreales	
Burseraceae	Bursera	P	Joachim Burser (1583–1639)	Sapindales	
Butomaceae	Butomus	G	ox-wounding (the inedible leaves harm cattle)	Alismatales	CS
Buxaceae	Buxus	L	Greek and Latin plant name	Buxales	CS
Byblidaceae	Byblis	G	Byblis, a mythological character	Lamiales	Bu
Cabombaceae	Cabomba	–	Guianese plant name	Nymphaeales	St
Cactaceae	—	G	Greek plant name	Caryophyllales	
Calceolariaceae	Calceolaria	G	slipper (the flowers)	Lamiales	CS
Calophyllaceae	Calophyllum	G	beautiful leaves	Malpighiales	St
Calycanthaceae	Calycanthus	G	calyx flower (the sepals are like the petals)	Laurales	CS
Calyceraceae	Calycera	G	calyx horn	Asterales	
Campanulaceae	Campanula	L	little bell (the flowers)	Asterales	CS
Campynemataceae	Campynema	G	bent thread	Liliales	
Canellaceae	Canella	G	little Canna	Canellales	St
Cannabaceae	Cannabis	L	Greek and Latin plant name	Rosales	St
Cannaceae	Canna	G	Greek plant name	Zingiberales	CS
Capparaceae	Capparis	G	Greek plant name	Brassicales	St
Caprifoliaceae	—	L	goat leaves	Dipsacales	
Cardiopteridaceae	Cardiopteris	G	heart wing or fern (the fruit)	Aquifoliales	Qu
Caricaceae	Carica	L	Latin plant name	Brassicales	St
Carlemanniaceae	Carlemannia	P	Charles Morgan Lemann (1806–1852)	Lamiales	Bu
Caryocaraceae	Caryocar	G	nut heart	Malpighiales	
Caryophyllaceae	—	G	clove	Caryophyllales	
Casuarinaceae	Casuarina	–	from a Malaysian word for cassowary	Fagales	St
Celastraceae	Celastrus	G	Greek plant name	Celastrales	CS
Centroplacaceae	Centroplacus	G	spurred and flat (the styles)	Malpighiales	Qu
Cephalotaceae	Cephalotus	G	head-like	Oxalidales	Gl
Ceratophyllaceae	Ceratophyllum	G	horned (antler-shaped) leaves	Ceratophyllales	CS
Cercidiphyllaceae	Cercidiphyllum	G	with leaves like Cercis siliquastrum	Saxifragales	CS
Chloranthaceae	Chloranthus	G	green flowers	Chloranthales	Ba
Chrysobalanaceae	Chrysobalanus	G	gold acorns	Malpighiales	St
Circaeasteraceae	Circaeaster	G	Circe, a mythological witch	Ranunculales	Bu
Cistaceae	Cistus	L	Greek and Latin plant name	Malvales	CS
Cleomaceae	Cleome	G	brilliance	Brassicales	St
Clethraceae	Clethra	G	Greek plant name	Ericales	CS
Clusiaceae	Clusia	P	Carolus Clusius (1526–1609)	Malpighiales	Bu
Colchicaceae	Colchicum	G	Colchis	Liliales	CS
Columelliaceae	Columellia	P	Columella (1st century)	Bruniales	Bu
Combretaceae	Combretum	L	Latin plant name	Myrtales	St
Commelinaceae	Commelina	P	Jan (1629–1692) and Caspar Commelijn (1667–1734)	Commelinales	CS
Connaraceae	Connarus	G	Greek plant name	Oxalidales	
Convolvulaceae	Convolvulus	L	twining	Solanales	CS
Coriariaceae	Coriaria	L	leather (for tanning)	Cucurbitales	CS
Cornaceae	Cornus	L	Latin plant name	Cornales	CS
Corsiaceae	Corsia	P	Bardo Corsi Salviati (1844–1907), Italian nobleman	Liliales	Bu
Corynocarpaceae	Corynocarpus	G	club fruit	Cucurbitales	St
Costaceae	Costus	L	Latin plant name	Zingiberales	St
Crassulaceae	Crassula	L	little thick (the leaves)	Saxifragales	CS
Crossosomataceae	Crossosoma	G	fringed body (the seeds)	Crossosomatales	
Crypteroniaceae	Crypteronia	G	hidden love (the small flowers)	Myrtales	
Ctenolophonaceae	Ctenolophon	G	comb hills	Malpighiales	
Cucurbitaceae	Cucurbita	L	Latin plant name	Cucurbitales	CS
Cunoniaceae	Cunonia	P	Johann Christian Cuno (b. 1708)	Oxalidales	Bu
Cupressaceae	Cupressus	L	Greek and Latin plant name	Pinales	CS
Curtisiaceae	Curtisia	P	William Curtis (1746–1799)	Cornales	Bu
Cycadaceae	Cycas	G	Greek plant name	Cycadales	CS
Cyclanthaceae	Cyclanthus	G	circle of flowers	Pandanales	St
Cymodoceaceae	Cymodocea	G	Cymodoce, a sea nymph	Alismatales	Bu
Cynomoriaceae	Cynomorium	G	dog penis	Saxifragales	
Cyperaceae	Cyperus	G	Greek plant name	Poales	CS
Cyrillaceae	Cyrilla	P	Domenico Cirillo (1739–1799)	Ericales	St
Cytinaceae	Cytinus	G	part of a pomegranate	Malvales	
Daphniphyllaceae	Daphniphyllum	G	leaves like Daphne	Saxifragales	CS
Dasypogonaceae	Dasypogon	G	hairy beard	Arecales	
Datiscaceae	Datisca	L	Greek and Latin plant name	Cucurbitales	CS
Degeneriaceae	Degeneria	P	Otto Degener (1899–1988)	Magnoliales	Bu
Diapensiaceae	Diapensia	G	Greek plant name	Ericales	St
Dichapetalaceae	Dichapetalum	G	two-part petals	Malpighiales	
Didiereaceae	Didierea	P	Alfred Grandidier (1836–1921)	Caryophyllales	Ba
Dilleniaceae	Dillenia	P	Johann Jacob Dillenius (1684–1747)	Dilleniales	
Dioncophyllaceae	Dioncophyllum	G	two-hooked leaves	Caryophyllales	
Dioscoreaceae	Dioscorea	P	Pedanius Dioscorides (c. 40 – c. 90)	Dioscoreales	
Dipentodontaceae	Dipentodon	G	two groups of five teeth (on the sepals and petals)	Huerteales	
Dipterocarpaceae	Dipterocarpus	G	two-winged fruit	Malvales	
Dirachmaceae	Dirachma	–	Socotran name, possibly	Rosales	
Doryanthaceae	Doryanthes	G	spear of flowers	Asparagales	St
Droseraceae	Drosera	G	dew (the secretions)	Caryophyllales	St
Drosophyllaceae	Drosophyllum	G	dewy leaves	Caryophyllales	
Ebenaceae	—	G	Greek plant name	Ericales	
Ecdeiocoleaceae	Ecdeiocolea	G	binding sheath (the scaly leaves)	Poales	
Elaeagnaceae	Elaeagnus	G	Greek plant name	Rosales	CS
Elaeocarpaceae	Elaeocarpus	G	olive (oil) fruit	Oxalidales	St
Elatinaceae	Elatine	L	Greek and Latin plant name	Malpighiales	St
Emblingiaceae	Emblingia	P	Thomas Embling (1814–1893), doctor	Brassicales	Qu
Ephedraceae	Ephedra	L	Greek and Latin plant name	Ephedrales	St
Ericaceae	Erica	L	Greek and Latin plant name	Ericales	CS
Eriocaulaceae	Eriocaulon	G	woolly stem	Poales	
Erythroxylaceae	Erythroxylum	G	red wood	Malpighiales	St
Escalloniaceae	Escallonia	P	Antonio José Escallón y Flórez (1739–1819), Spanish official and plant-hunter in South America	Escalloniales	
Eucommiaceae	Eucommia	G	good gum	Garryales	St
Euphorbiaceae	Euphorbia	L	Greek and Latin plant name	Malpighiales	CS
Euphroniaceae	Euphronia	P	Euphronis, ancient writer on cultivation	Malpighiales	Bu
Eupomatiaceae	Eupomatia	G	well-capped	Magnoliales	
Eupteleaceae	Euptelea	G	good elm	Ranunculales	St
Fabaceae	—	L	Latin plant name	Fabales	
Fagaceae	Fagus	L	Latin plant name	Fagales	CS
Flagellariaceae	Flagellaria	G	whip-like (tendrils)	Poales	
Fouquieriaceae	Fouquieria	P	Pierre Fouquier (1776–1850), doctor	Ericales	
Francoaceae	Francoa	P	Francisco Franco (c. 1515 – c. 1569), Spanish doctor	Geraniales	
Frankeniaceae	Frankenia	P	Johann Francke (1590–1661), Swedish botanist	Caryophyllales	
Garryaceae	Garrya	P	Nicholas Garry (c. 1782 – 1856), merchant and trader	Garryales	
Geissolomataceae	Geissoloma	G	tiled fringe (the petals)	Crossosomatales	Qu
Gelsemiaceae	Gelsemium	–	Italian plant name	Gentianales	CS
Gentianaceae	Gentiana	P	Gentius (d. 168 BC), king	Gentianales	
Geraniaceae	Geranium	L	crane (the fruit). Greek and Latin name.	Geraniales	CS
Gerrardinaceae	Gerrardina	P	William Tyrer Gerrard (c. 1831 – 1866)	Huerteales	Qu
Gesneriaceae	Gesneria	P	Conrad Gessner (1516–1565)	Lamiales	St
Ginkgoaceae	Ginkgo	–	Chinese and Japanese plant name	Ginkgoales	CS
Gisekiaceae	Gisekia	P	Paul Dietrich Giseke (1741–1796)	Caryophyllales	Qu
Gnetaceae	Gnetum	–	Maluku or Malay plant name	Gnetales	
Gomortegaceae	Gomortega	P	Casimiro Gómez Ortega (1741–1818)	Laurales	Bu
Goodeniaceae	Goodenia	P	Samuel Goodenough (1743–1827)	Asterales	
Goupiaceae	Goupia	–	Ndyuka plant name	Malpighiales	
Griseliniaceae	Griselinia	P	Francesco Griselini (1717–1783), Italian botanist	Apiales	
Grossulariaceae	—	L	Latin plant name	Saxifragales	
Grubbiaceae	Grubbia	P	Michael Grubb (1728–1808), Swedish botanist, plant collector and mineralogist	Cornales	Qu
Guamatelaceae	Guamatela	–	anagram of Guatemala	Crossosomatales	
Gunneraceae	Gunnera	P	Johan Ernst Gunnerus (1718–1773)	Gunnerales	
Gyrostemonaceae	Gyrostemon	G	round stamens	Brassicales	
Haemodoraceae	Haemodorum	G	blood gift	Commelinales	
Halophytaceae	Halophytum	G	salt plant	Caryophyllales	
Haloragaceae	Haloragis	G	salt berries	Saxifragales	
Hamamelidaceae	Hamamelis	G	Greek plant name	Saxifragales	CS
Hanguanaceae	Hanguana	–	Indonesian plant name	Commelinales	
Heliconiaceae	Heliconia	L	Latin name, from Mount Helicon	Zingiberales	St
Helwingiaceae	Helwingia	P	Georg Andreas Helwing (1666–1748)	Aquifoliales	
Hernandiaceae	Hernandia	P	Francisco Hernández de Toledo (1514–1587)	Laurales	Qu
Himantandraceae	—	G	strap-like male parts	Magnoliales	
Huaceae	Hua	P	Henri Hua (1861–1919), French botanist	Oxalidales	Bu
Humiriaceae	Humiria	–	Carib plant name	Malpighiales	
Hydatellaceae	—	G	little water (plant)	Nymphaeales	
Hydrangeaceae	Hydrangea	G	water container (the cup-shaped capsules)	Cornales	CS
Hydrocharitaceae	Hydrocharis	G	water grace	Alismatales	St
Hydroleaceae	Hydrolea	G	water olive	Solanales	St
Hydrostachyaceae	Hydrostachys	G	water spike	Cornales	
Hypericaceae	Hypericum	G	Greek plant name	Malpighiales	
Hypoxidaceae	Hypoxis	G	Greek plant name	Asparagales	St
Icacinaceae	Icacina	–	Arawak name, originally	Icacinales	
Iridaceae	Iris	G	rainbow (the flowers)	Asparagales	CS
Irvingiaceae	Irvingia	P	Edward Irving (1816–1855)	Malpighiales	Qu
Iteaceae	Itea	G	Greek plant name	Saxifragales	CS
Ixioliriaceae	Ixiolirion	G	Ixia + lily	Asparagales	St
Ixonanthaceae	Ixonanthes	G	sticky flowers	Malpighiales	Gl
Joinvilleaceae	Joinvillea	P	François d'Orléans, Prince of Joinville (1818–1900)	Poales	Bu
Juglandaceae	Juglans	L	Latin plant name	Fagales	CS
Juncaceae	Juncus	L	binding. Latin name.	Poales	CS
Juncaginaceae	—	L	Latin plant name	Alismatales	
Kewaceae	Kewa	–	Kew, London, England	Caryophyllales	
Kirkiaceae	Kirkia	P	John Kirk (1832–1922)	Sapindales	Bu
Koeberliniaceae	Koeberlinia	P	Christoph Ludwig Köberlin (1794–1862), German botanist and clergyman	Brassicales	Bu
Krameriaceae	Krameria	P	Wilhelm Heinrich Kramer (1724–1765)	Zygophyllales	
Lacistemataceae	Lacistema	L	torn + Greek: stamens	Malpighiales	
Lamiaceae	Lamium	L	Latin name: open mouth (the flowers)	Lamiales	CS
Lanariaceae	Lanaria	G	woolly	Asparagales	
Lardizabalaceae	Lardizabala	P	Manuel de Lardizábal y Uribe (1744–1824), politician	Ranunculales	
Lauraceae	Laurus	L	Latin plant name	Laurales	CS
Lecythidaceae	Lecythis	G	oil pot (the shape of the fruit)	Ericales	
Lentibulariaceae	—	G	lentil-shaped bladders, probably	Lamiales	
Lepidobotryaceae	Lepidobotrys	G	scale clusters	Celastrales	
Liliaceae	Lilium	L	Latin plant name	Liliales	CS
Limeaceae	Limeum	L	path (some habitats)	Caryophyllales	
Limnanthaceae	Limnanthes	G	marsh flowers	Brassicales	St
Linaceae	Linum	L	Latin plant name	Malpighiales	CS
Linderniaceae	Lindernia	P	Franz Balthasar von Lindern (1682–1755), French doctor and botanist	Lamiales	Bu
Loasaceae	Loasa	–	probably a South American plant name	Cornales	St
Loganiaceae	Logania	P	James Logan (1674–1751)	Gentianales	
Lophiocarpaceae	Lophiocarpus	G	small-crested fruit	Caryophyllales	
Lophopyxidaceae	Lophopyxis	G	crested box (the fruit)	Malpighiales	
Loranthaceae	Loranthus	L	strap + Greek: flowers	Santalales	
Lowiaceae	Lowia	P	Hugh Lowe (1824–1905), English colonial administrator and naturalist	Zingiberales	Bu
Lythraceae	Lythrum	G	bloody (the flowers)	Myrtales	CS
Macarthuriaceae	Macarthuria	P	William Macarthur (1800–1882)	Caryophyllales	Qu
Magnoliaceae	Magnolia	P	Pierre Magnol (1638–1715)	Magnoliales	
Malpighiaceae	Malpighia	P	Marcello Malpighi (1628–1694)	Malpighiales	
Malvaceae	Malva	L	Latin plant name	Malvales	CS
Marantaceae	Maranta	P	Bartolomeo Maranta (1500–1571)	Zingiberales	
Marcgraviaceae	Marcgravia	P	Georg Marcgrave (1610–1644)	Ericales	Qu
Martyniaceae	Martynia	P	John Martyn (1699–1768)	Lamiales	
Maundiaceae	Maundia	P	John Maund (1823–1858), English-born Australian doctor and chemist	Alismatales	Bu
Mayacaceae	Mayaca	–	French Guianese plant name	Poales	St
Mazaceae	Mazus	G	teat, for swellings on the lower lip of the flowers	Lamiales	CS
Melanthiaceae	Melanthium	G	dark flowers	Liliales	St
Melastomataceae	Melastoma	G	black mouth (the berries stain the mouth when eaten)	Myrtales	St
Meliaceae	Melia	G	Greek plant name	Sapindales	CS
Menispermaceae	Menispermum	G	moon seeds	Ranunculales	St
Menyanthaceae	Menyanthes	G	Greek name: small flowers or moon flowers	Asterales	CS
Metteniusaceae	Metteniusa	P	Georg Heinrich Mettenius (1823–1866)	Metteniusales	Bu
Microteaceae	Microtea	G	smallness, probably	Caryophyllales	
Misodendraceae	Misodendrum	G	hating trees	Santalales	
Mitrastemonaceae	Mitrastemon	G	miter + stamens	Ericales	
Molluginaceae	Mollugo	G	soft	Caryophyllales	
Monimiaceae	Monimia	P	Monime (d. 71 BC), a queen of Pontus	Laurales	Bu
Montiaceae	Montia	P	Giuseppe Monti (1682–1760)	Caryophyllales	
Montiniaceae	Montinia	P	Lars Jonasson Montin (1723–1785), Swedish botanist and doctor	Solanales	Bu
Moraceae	Morus	L	Greek and Latin plant name	Rosales	CS
Moringaceae	Moringa	–	Latinised Tamil plant name	Brassicales	St
Muntingiaceae	Muntingia	P	Abraham Munting (1626–1683)	Malvales	Bu
Musaceae	Musa	–	Latinised Arabic plant name	Zingiberales	St
Myodocarpaceae	Myodocarpus	G	mouse (-eared) fruit	Apiales	
Myricaceae	Myrica	L	Greek and Latin plant name	Fagales	CS
Myristicaceae	Myristica	G	fragrant ointment	Magnoliales	St
Myrothamnaceae	Myrothamnus	G	perfume bush	Gunnerales	
Myrtaceae	Myrtus	L	Greek and Latin plant name	Myrtales	CS
Nartheciaceae	Narthecium	G	Greek plant name	Dioscoreales	St
Nelumbonaceae	Nelumbo	–	Sinhalese plant name	Proteales	St
Nepenthaceae	Nepenthes	G	antidepressant	Caryophyllales	St
Neuradaceae	Neurada	L	Greek and Latin plant name	Malvales	Qu
Nitrariaceae	Nitraria	G	niter (found in the habitat)	Sapindales	
Nothofagaceae	Nothofagus	L	false Fagus	Fagales	CS
Nyctaginaceae	—	G	night (flowering)	Caryophyllales	
Nymphaeaceae	Nymphaea	G	water nymphs	Nymphaeales	CS
Nyssaceae	Nyssa	G	Nysa, a water nymph	Cornales	CS
Ochnaceae	Ochna	G	Greek plant name	Malpighiales	St
Olacaceae	Olax	L	scented (wood)	Santalales	
Oleaceae	Olea	L	Latin plant name	Lamiales	CS
Onagraceae	—	G	onager (fodder)	Myrtales	
Oncothecaceae	Oncotheca	G	bulky box (the anthers)	Icacinales	Qu
Opiliaceae	Opilia	–	(unknown)	Santalales	
Orchidaceae	Orchis	G	testicle (the root tubers)	Asparagales	St
Orobanchaceae	Orobanche	L	Greek and Latin plant name	Lamiales	St
Oxalidaceae	Oxalis	L	Greek and Latin plant name	Oxalidales	CS
Paeoniaceae	Paeonia	L	Greek and Latin plant name	Saxifragales	CS
Pandaceae	Panda	P	Paul Panda Farnana (1888–1930)	Malpighiales	
Pandanaceae	Pandanus	–	Malay plant name	Pandanales	St
Papaveraceae	Papaver	L	Latin plant name	Ranunculales	CS
Paracryphiaceae	Paracryphia	G	almost hidden	Paracryphiales	Qu
Passifloraceae	Passiflora	L	Latin: passion flowers	Malpighiales	CS
Paulowniaceae	Paulownia	P	Anna Pavlovna of Russia (1795–1865)	Lamiales	
Pedaliaceae	Pedalium	G	rudder	Lamiales	
Penaeaceae	Penaea	P	Pierre Pena (1535–1605), French doctor and botanist	Myrtales	Bu
Pennantiaceae	Pennantia	P	Thomas Pennant (1726–1798)	Apiales	Bu
Pentadiplandraceae	Pentadiplandra	G	five double male parts (the ten stamens, usually)	Brassicales	
Pentaphragmataceae	Pentaphragma	G	five fences (around the ovaries)	Asterales	Qu
Pentaphylacaceae	Pentaphylax	G	five guardians (the stamens)	Ericales	Qu
Penthoraceae	Penthorum	G	five (sections per fruit)	Saxifragales	
Peraceae	Pera	G	pouch (the fruits)	Malpighiales	
Peridiscaceae	Peridiscus	G	around the disk (the stamens)	Saxifragales	Qu
Petenaeaceae	Petenaea	–	Lake Petén Itzá	Huerteales	
Petermanniaceae	Petermannia	P	August Heinrich Petermann (1822–1878), cartographer	Liliales	Bu
Petiveriaceae	Petiveria	P	James Petiver (c. 1660 – 1718)	Caryophyllales	
Petrosaviaceae	Petrosavia	P	Pietro Savi (1811–1871), Italian professor of botany	Petrosaviales	Bu
Phellinaceae	Phelline	G	corky (the fruits and seeds)	Asterales	Qu
Philesiaceae	Philesia	G	loving	Liliales	St
Philydraceae	Philydrum	G	friend of water	Commelinales	
Phrymaceae	Phryma	G	toad, possibly	Lamiales	
Phyllanthaceae	Phyllanthus	G	leaf-flowers (the source of some flowers)	Malpighiales	St
Phyllonomaceae	Phyllonoma	G	leaf meadow (the flowers sprouting from the leaves)	Aquifoliales	Qu
Physenaceae	Physena	G	inflated (the fruit)	Caryophyllales	Qu
Phytolaccaceae	Phytolacca	G	plant lac	Caryophyllales	CS
Picramniaceae	Picramnia	G	bitter bush	Picramniales	
Picrodendraceae	Picrodendron	G	bitter tree	Malpighiales	
Pinaceae	Pinus	L	Latin plant name	Pinales	CS
Piperaceae	Piper	L	Latin name, from Sanskrit and Greek names	Piperales	St
Pittosporaceae	Pittosporum	G	tar seeds	Apiales	CS
Plantaginaceae	Plantago	L	Latin plant name	Lamiales	CS
Platanaceae	Platanus	L	Greek and Latin plant name	Proteales	CS
Plocospermataceae	Plocosperma	G	tufted seeds	Lamiales	
Plumbaginaceae	Plumbago	L	Latin plant name	Caryophyllales	CS
Poaceae	Poa	G	Greek plant name	Poales	CS
Podocarpaceae	Podocarpus	G	stalked fruit	Pinales	CS
Podostemaceae	Podostemum	G	foot stamens	Malpighiales	Gl
Polemoniaceae	Polemonium	L	Greek and Latin plant name	Ericales	CS
Polygalaceae	Polygala	L	Greek and Latin plant name	Fabales	CS
Polygonaceae	Polygonum	L	Greek and Latin plant name	Caryophyllales	St
Pontederiaceae	Pontederia	P	Giulio Pontedera (1688–1757)	Commelinales	
Portulacaceae	Portulaca	L	Latin plant name	Caryophyllales	St
Posidoniaceae	Posidonia	G	Poseidon, a god	Alismatales	Bu
Potamogetonaceae	Potamogeton	L	Greek and Latin plant name	Alismatales	St
Primulaceae	Primula	L	Medieval Latin plant name	Ericales	CS
Proteaceae	Protea	G	Proteus of mythology	Proteales	St
Putranjivaceae	Putranjiva	–	Sanskrit plant name	Malpighiales	
Quillajaceae	Quillaja	–	Chilean plant name	Fabales	St
Rafflesiaceae	Rafflesia	P	Stamford Raffles (1781–1826)	Malpighiales	
Ranunculaceae	Ranunculus	L	Latin: little frog (some species are aquatic)	Ranunculales	CS
Rapateaceae	Rapatea	–	French Guianese name, probably	Poales	
Resedaceae	Reseda	L	Latin plant name	Brassicales	St
Restionaceae	Restio	L	rope-maker	Poales	Ba
Rhabdodendraceae	Rhabdodendron	G	rod tree	Caryophyllales	
Rhamnaceae	Rhamnus	L	Greek and Latin plant name	Rosales	CS
Rhizophoraceae	Rhizophora	G	root-bearing	Malpighiales	
Ripogonaceae	Ripogonum	G	wicker knees (the many joints on the tangled stalks)	Liliales	St
Roridulaceae	Roridula	G	dewy (leaves)	Ericales	Gl
Rosaceae	Rosa	L	Latin plant name	Rosales	CS
Rousseaceae	Roussea	P	Jean-Jacques Rousseau (1712–1778), Enlightenment philosopher	Asterales	Bu
Rubiaceae	Rubia	L	red (the roots, used in dyeing)	Gentianales	St
Ruppiaceae	Ruppia	P	Heinrich Bernhard Ruppius (1688–1719)	Alismatales	Qu
Rutaceae	Ruta	L	Latin plant name	Sapindales	CS
Sabiaceae	Sabia	–	Hindi plant name	Proteales	
Salicaceae	Salix	L	Latin plant name	Malpighiales	CS
Salvadoraceae	Salvadora	P	Jaime Salvador y Pedrol (1649–1740), Spanish apothecary	Brassicales	Bu
Santalaceae	Santalum	L	Greek and Latin plant name	Santalales	St
Sapindaceae	Sapindus	L	soap of India	Sapindales	St
Sapotaceae	—	–	Nahuatl plant name	Ericales	
Sarcobataceae	Sarcobatus	G	fleshy thorn bush	Caryophyllales	Gl
Sarcolaenaceae	Sarcolaena	G	flesh cloak	Malvales	
Sarraceniaceae	Sarracenia	P	Michel Sarrazin (1659–1736)	Ericales	
Saururaceae	Saururus	G	lizard tail	Piperales	St
Saxifragaceae	Saxifraga	L	stone-breaking	Saxifragales	CS
Scheuchzeriaceae	Scheuchzeria	P	Johann Gaspar Scheuchzer (1684–1738) and his brother Johann Jacob Scheuchzer (1672–1733)	Alismatales	Bu
Schisandraceae	Schisandra	G	divided male parts (the anthers)	Austrobaileyales	CS
Schlegeliaceae	Schlegelia	P	Hermann Schlegel (1804–1884)	Lamiales	Bu
Schoepfiaceae	Schoepfia	P	Johann David Schoepff (1752–1800)	Santalales	Bu
Sciadopityaceae	Sciadopitys	G	umbel or parasol + pine or fir (the leaves)	Pinales	CS
Scrophulariaceae	Scrophularia	L	(supposed cure for) scrofula	Lamiales	St
Setchellanthaceae	Setchellanthus	P	William Albert Setchell (1864–1943)	Brassicales	Bu
Simaroubaceae	Simarouba	–	Carib plant name	Sapindales	
Simmondsiaceae	Simmondsia	P	Thomas William Simmonds (1767–1804), English doctor and naturalist	Caryophyllales	Ba
Siparunaceae	Siparuna	–	French Guianese plant name	Laurales	
Sladeniaceae	Sladenia	P	Edward Bosc Sladen (1827–1890), army officer	Ericales	Bu
Smilacaceae	Smilax	L	Greek and Latin plant name	Liliales	CS
Solanaceae	Solanum	L	Latin plant name	Solanales	CS
Sphaerosepalaceae	—	G	spherical sepals	Malvales	
Sphenocleaceae	Sphenoclea	G	closed wedge (the fruit capsules)	Solanales	
Stachyuraceae	Stachyurus	G	spike tail (the inflorescences)	Crossosomatales	CS
Staphyleaceae	Staphylea	G	clusters (of flowers)	Crossosomatales	CS
Stegnospermataceae	Stegnosperma	G	seeds covered (by arilla)	Caryophyllales	
Stemonaceae	Stemona	G	stamens	Pandanales	
Stemonuraceae	Stemonurus	G	stamen tail	Aquifoliales	
Stilbaceae	Stilbe	G	shining	Lamiales	
Strasburgeriaceae	Strasburgeria	P	Eduard Strasburger (1844–1912)	Crossosomatales	Bu
Strelitziaceae	Strelitzia	P	Charlotte of Mecklenburg-Strelitz (1744–1818)	Zingiberales	
Stylidiaceae	Stylidium	G	little pillar (the style and stamens form a column)	Asterales	St
Styracaceae	Styrax	L	Greek and Latin name, from an Arabic plant name	Ericales	CS
Surianaceae	Suriana	P	Joseph Donat Surian (1650–1691), French doctor, chemist and botanist	Fabales	Bu
Symplocaceae	Symplocos	G	combination (the unified stamens)	Ericales	St
Talinaceae	Talinum	–	(unclear)	Caryophyllales	Ba
Tamaricaceae	Tamarix	L	Latin plant name	Caryophyllales	CS
Tapisciaceae	Tapiscia	–	anagram of Pistacia	Huerteales	
Taxaceae	Taxus	L	Latin plant name	Pinales	CS
Tecophilaeaceae	Tecophilaea	P	Tecophila Billotti (1802 or 1803 – 1885 or 1886), Italian botanical artist	Asparagales	
Tetracarpaeaceae	Tetracarpaea	G	four-fruited	Saxifragales	
Tetrachondraceae	Tetrachondra	G	four-cartilaged	Lamiales	Qu
Tetramelaceae	Tetrameles	G	four parts (the sepals)	Cucurbitales	
Tetrameristaceae	Tetramerista	G	four-part (flowers)	Ericales	
Theaceae	—	–	Chinese plant name	Ericales	
Thomandersiaceae	Thomandersia	P	Thomas Anderson (1832–1870)	Lamiales	Bu
Thurniaceae	Thurnia	P	Everard im Thurn (1852–1932)	Poales	Bu
Thymelaeaceae	Thymelaea	G	poison olive	Malvales	
Ticodendraceae	Ticodendron	G	Tico tree	Fagales	
Tofieldiaceae	Tofieldia	P	Thomas Tofield (1730–1779), English hydrological engineer and botanist	Alismatales	Bu
Torricelliaceae	Torricellia	P	Evangelista Torricelli (1608–1647), physicist and mathematician	Apiales	Bu
Tovariaceae	Tovaria	P	Simón de Tovar, Spanish doctor and botanist	Brassicales	Bu
Trigoniaceae	Trigonia	G	triangular (the fruit)	Malpighiales	
Trimeniaceae	Trimenia	P	Henry Trimen (1843–1896)	Austrobaileyales	Bu
Triuridaceae	Triuris	G	three tails	Pandanales	
Trochodendraceae	Trochodendron	G	wheel (of stamens) + tree	Trochodendrales	CS
Tropaeolaceae	Tropaeolum	G	trophy	Brassicales	CS
Typhaceae	Typha	L	Greek and Latin plant name	Poales	CS
Ulmaceae	Ulmus	L	Latin plant name	Rosales	CS
Urticaceae	Urtica	L	Latin plant name	Rosales	St
Vahliaceae	Vahlia	P	Martin Vahl (1749–1804)	Vahliales	Qu
Velloziaceae	Vellozia	P	Joaquim Velloso de Miranda (1733–1815), Brazilian clergyman and plant collector	Pandanales	Bu
Verbenaceae	Verbena	L	ceremonial plant	Lamiales	CS
Viburnaceae	Viburnum	L	Latin name. Previously Adoxaceae.	Dipsacales	CS
Violaceae	Viola	L	Latin plant name	Malpighiales	CS
Vitaceae	Vitis	L	Latin plant name	Vitales	CS
Vochysiaceae	Vochysia	–	Carib plant name	Myrtales	
Welwitschiaceae	Welwitschia	P	Friedrich Welwitsch (1806–1872)	Welwitschiales	
Winteraceae	Wintera	P	John Winter (16th century), ship captain	Canellales	Bu
Xeronemataceae	Xeronema	G	dry thread	Asparagales	
Xyridaceae	Xyris	G	razor (the leaves)	Poales	
Zamiaceae	Zamia	L	from a Latin plant name	Cycadales	CS
Zingiberaceae	Zingiber	L	Greek and Latin name, from a Sanskrit plant name	Zingiberales	St
Zosteraceae	Zostera	G	belt	Alismatales	
Zygophyllaceae	Zygophyllum	G	yoked leaves	Zygophyllales	

== See also ==
- Glossary of botanical terms
- List of Greek and Latin roots in English
- List of Latin and Greek words commonly used in systematic names
- List of plant genera named after people: A–C, D–J, K–P, Q–Z
- List of plant genus names with etymologies: A–C, D–K, L–P, Q–Z
