= Coronariae =

Historical term for group of flowering plants, including lilies

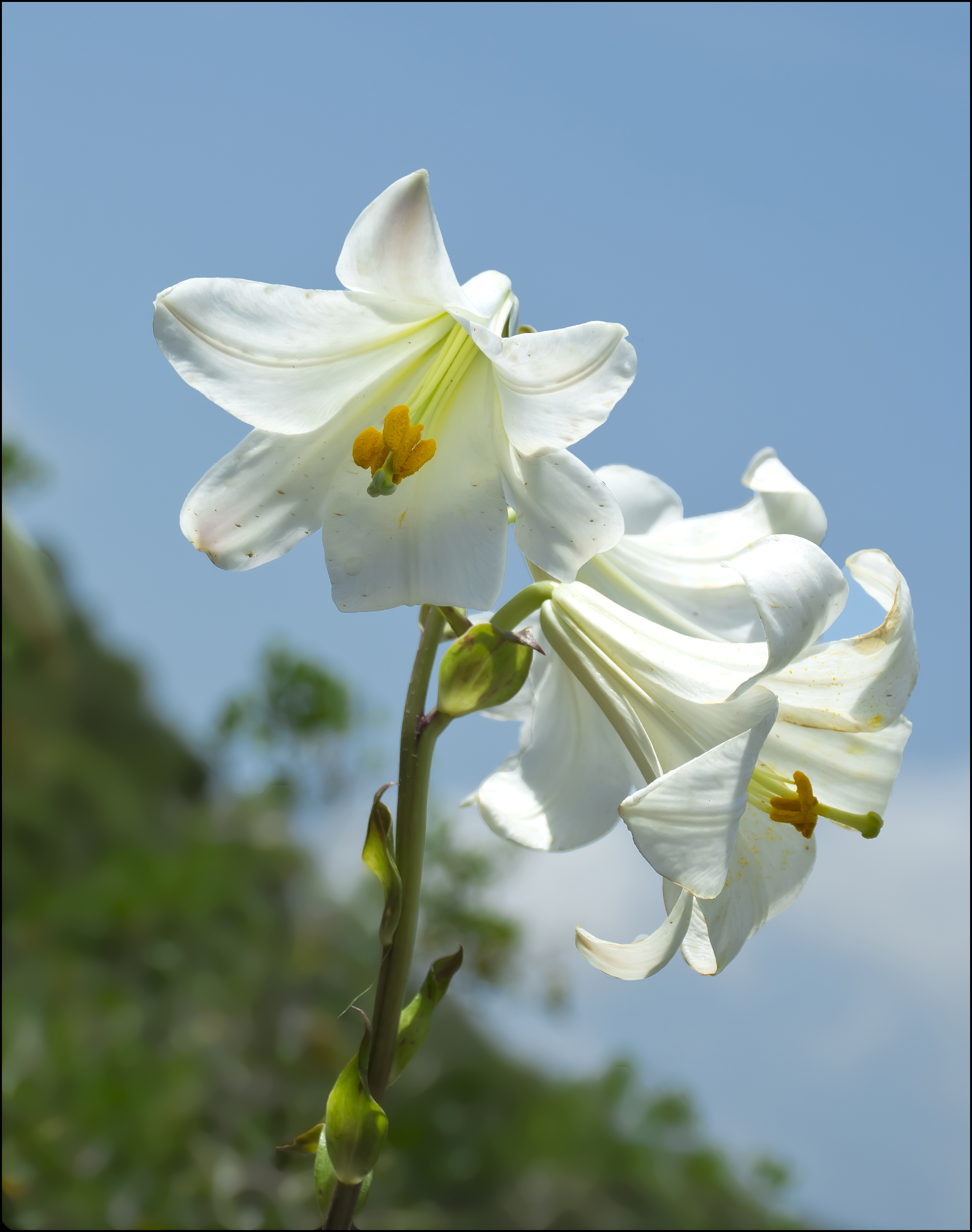
Lilium candidum Madonna lily (Liliaceae)

Coronariae (literally a crown or garland) is a term used historically to refer to a group of flowering plants, generally including the lilies (Liliaceae), and later replaced by the order Liliales. First used in the 17th century by John Ray, it referred to flowers used to insert in garlands. Coronariae soon came to be associated with Liliaceae in the Linnaean system. The term was abandoned at the end of the 19th century, being replaced with Liliiflorae and then Liliales.

== History ==
=== Seventeenth to nineteenth century usage ===
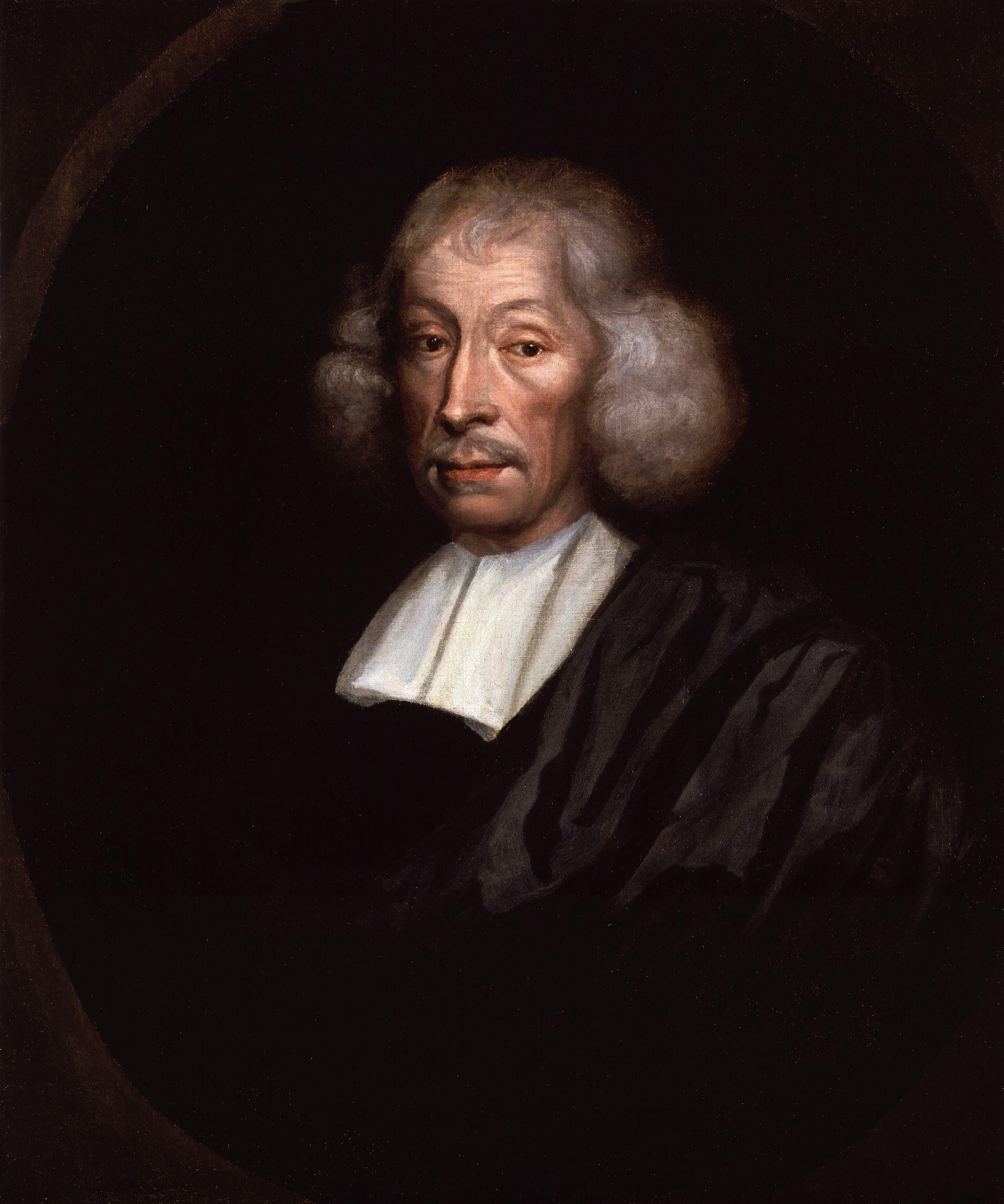
John Ray 1627–1705

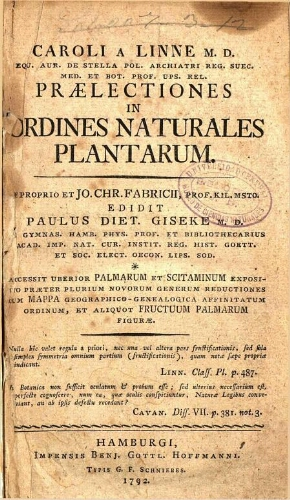
Cover of Praelectiones in ordines naturales plantarum

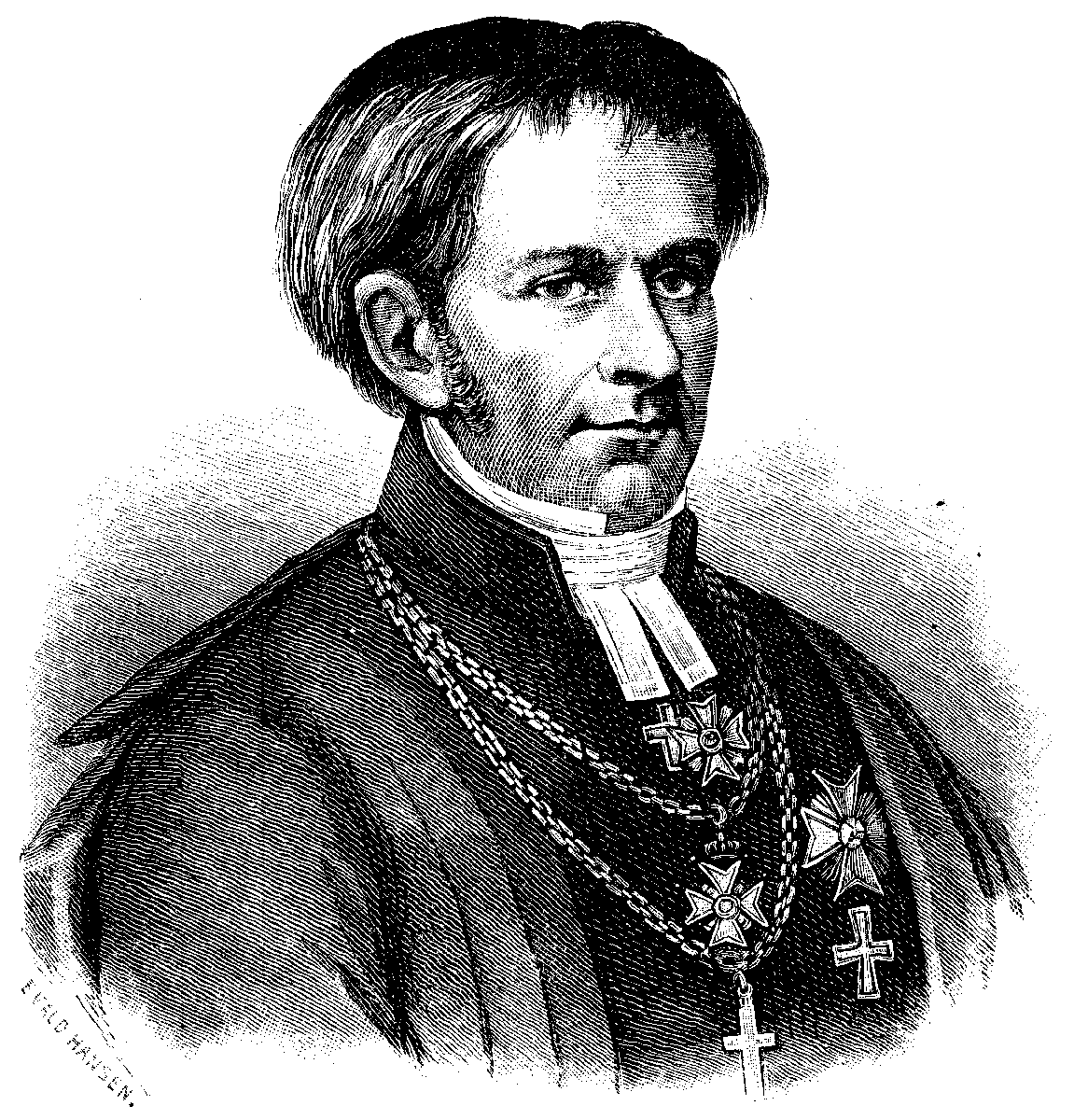
Carl Adolph Agardh 1785–1859

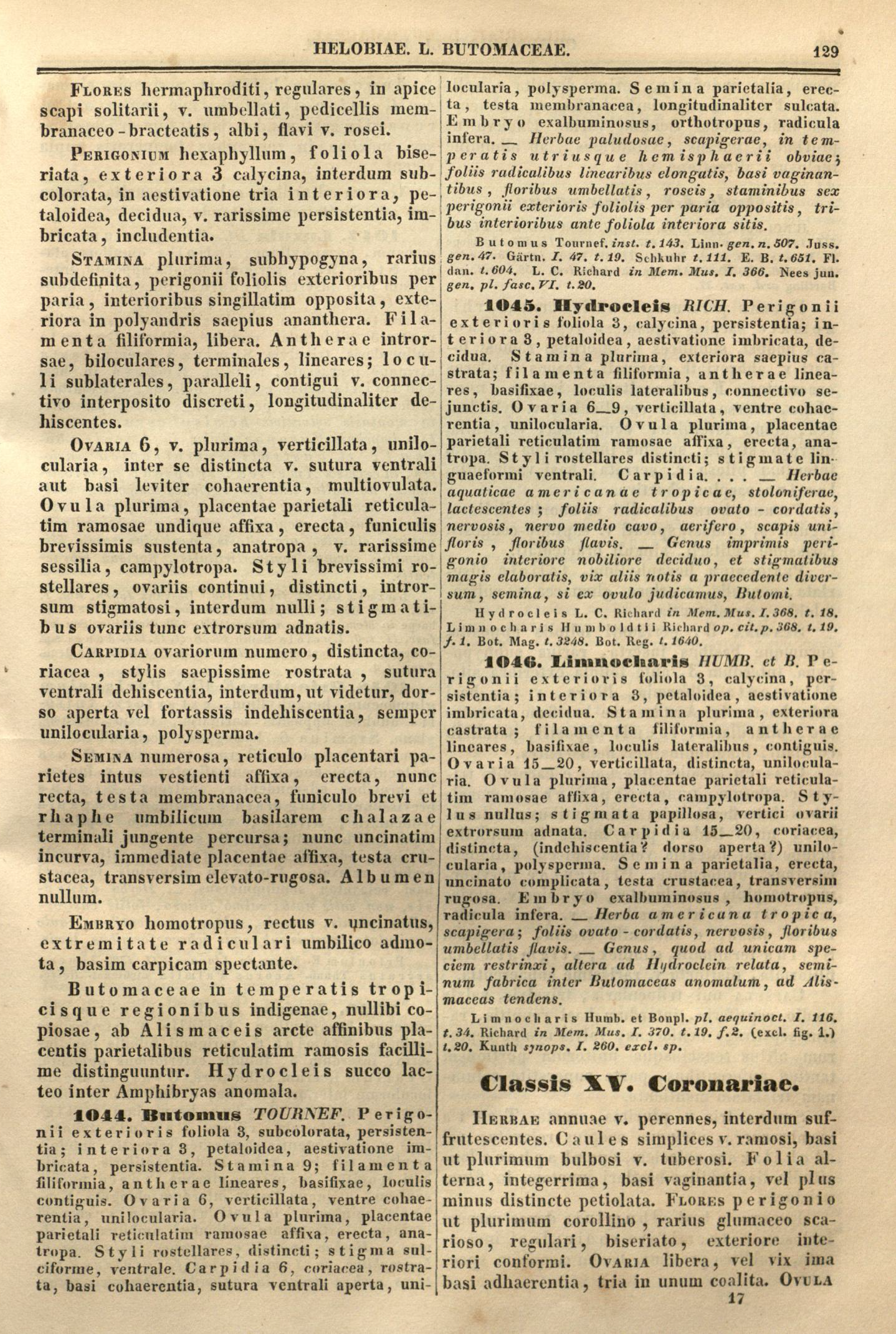
Endlicher's Coronariae (1836)

Coronariae was first used by John Ray in his Catalogus plantarum circa Cantabrigiam (1660) as one of 21 classes of herbaceous plants. In this grouping he included Armerius and Caryophyllus (i.e. Dianthus, Caryophyllaceae). It was next used by Linnaeus in his Philosophia Botanica (1751) to refer to a very different group of plants. Linnaeus followed Ray in describing Coronariae as "a beautiful [flower] which is inserted in crowns or garlands". His Coronariae was the ninth of his 67 ordines naturales (i.e. families), consisting of six genera, followed by Liliaceae and Muricatae. These three orders consisted of the following genera:

9. Coronariae

- Ornithogalum
- Scilla
- Hyacinthus
- Asphodelus
- Anthericum
- Polianthes

10. Liliaceae

- Lilium
- Fritillaria
- Tulipa
- Erythronium

11. Muricatae

- Bromelia
- Renealmia
- Tillandsia
- Burmannia

In a later posthumous publication, Praelectiones in ordines naturales plantarum (1792), Coronariae appear as Ordo X with 28 genera, Linnaeus having merged his previous Liliaceae into Coronariae together with his eleventh order, Muricatae. In developing an ordered system of taxonomic ranks, Agardh (1825) followed Linnaeus but placed his Coronariae within the higher rank (class) of Liliiflorae and confined it to the original Liliaceae:

- XI. Liliiflorae
  - 43 Asparageae
  - 44 Asphodeleae
  - 45 Coronariae
  - 46 Veratreae Salisb.
  - 47 Commelineae Br.
  - 48 Pontedereae Kunth.
  - 49 Dioscorinae Br.
  - 50 Haemodoreae Br.
  - 51 Irideae Juss.
  - 52 Narcisseae Juss.
  - 53 Bromeliaceae Juss.

At about the same time, Perleb (1826) followed a similar scheme with eleven families grouped into an order he called Liliaceae:

- Liliaceae
  - Asparageae
  - Pontederiaceae
  - Asphodeleae
  - Coronariae (Note: Coronariae used sensu Agardh (1825), i.e. Linnaeus' Liliaceae)
  - Colchicaceae
  - Dioscoreaceae
  - Hypoxideae
  - Amaryllideae
  - Haemodoraceae
  - Burmanniaceae
  - Irideae

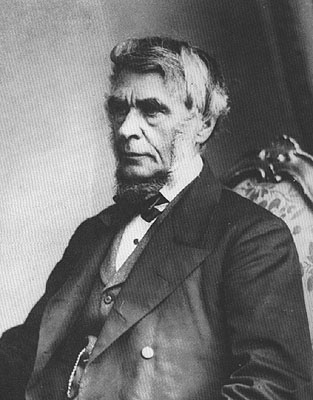
George Bentham 1800–1884

Endlicher (1836) used Coronariae as a class with six subordinate orders, restoring Liliaceae as the family name:

- Classis 15. Coronariae
  - Ordo 51. Juncaceae
  - Ordo 52. Philydreae
  - Ordo 53. Melanthaceae
  - Ordo 54. Pontederaceae
  - Ordo 55. Liliaceae
  - Ordo 56. Smilaceae

Subsequent authors, such as Lindley (1853), preferred the term Liliales for a higher order (which Lindley called Alliances), including four families including Liliaceae. Lindley lists Coronariae as a synonym of Liliaceae:

- Liliales
  - Gilliesiaceae
  - Melanthaceae
  - Liliaceae
  - Pontederaceae

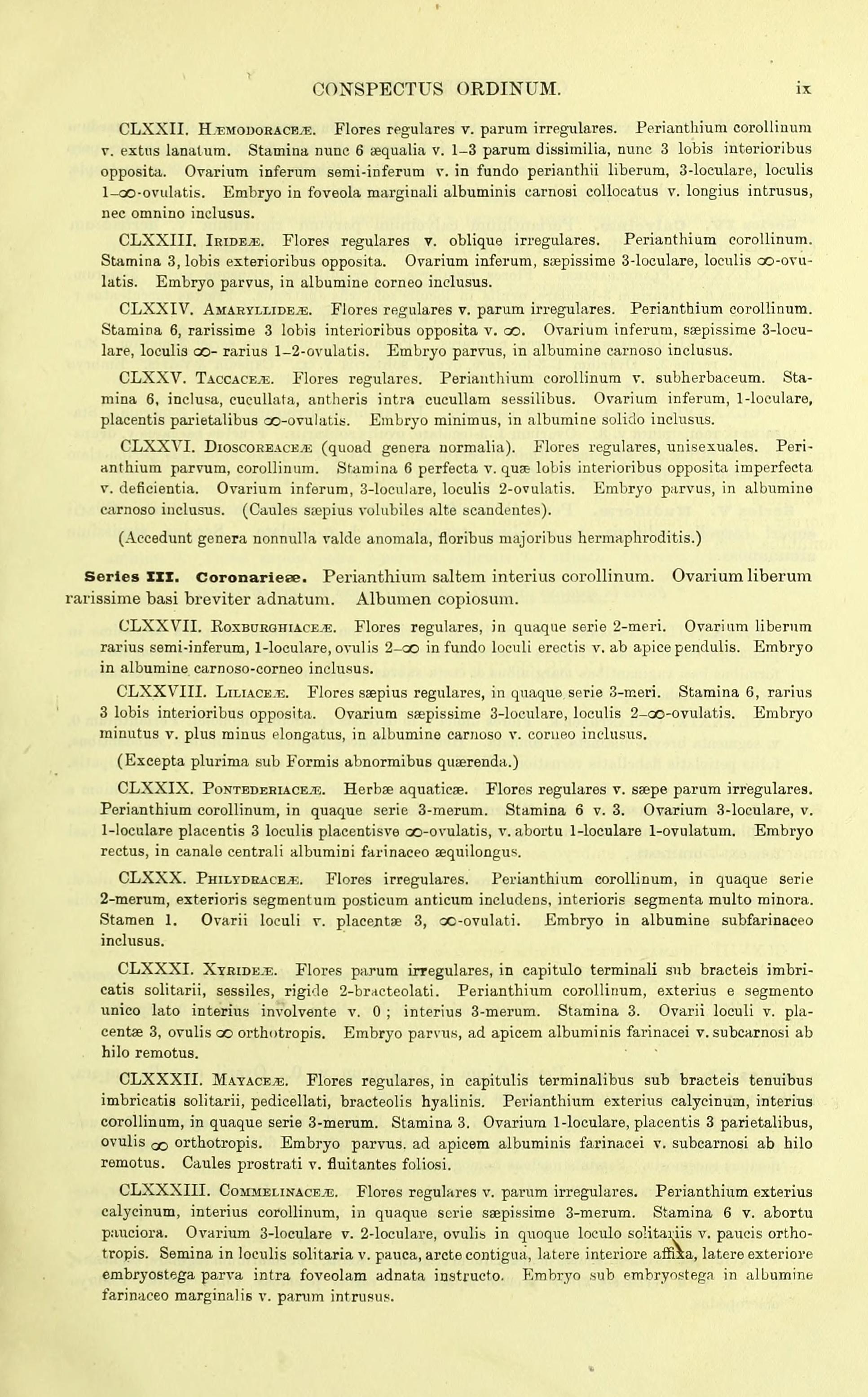
Bentham's conspectus of Coronariae 1883

However Bentham (1877) restored the term as one of four alliances making up the monocotyledons, with 8 families:

- 2. Coronariae
  - Roxburghiaceae
  - Liliaceae
  - Pontederaceae
  - Philydraceae
  - Xyrideae
  - Commelynaceae
  - Junceae
  - Palmae

He developed this further in his Genera plantarum (1883), this time dividing the monocotyledons into seven groups, called Series, of which in Coronariae he added Mayaceae and Rapateaceae, renamed Commelynaceae as Commelinaceae and omitted Junceae and Palmae.

=== Later alternative nomenclature ===
Subsequent authors, now adopting a phylogenetic (phyletic) or evolutionary approach over the natural method, did not adopt Bentham's nomenclature. Eichler (1886) used Liliiflorae for the higher order including Liliaceae, as did Engler (1903) and Lotsy (1911).

Hutchinson (1973) restored Liliales for the higher rank, an approach that has been adopted by most major classification systems onwards, reserving Liliiflorae for higher ranks. these include Cronquist (1981), Takhtajan (1997), Thorne and Reveal (2007). This is also the nomenclature of the molecular phylogenetic based modern system of the Angiosperm Phylogeny Group (APG, 1998–2016).

== Modern equivalent (Liliales) ==
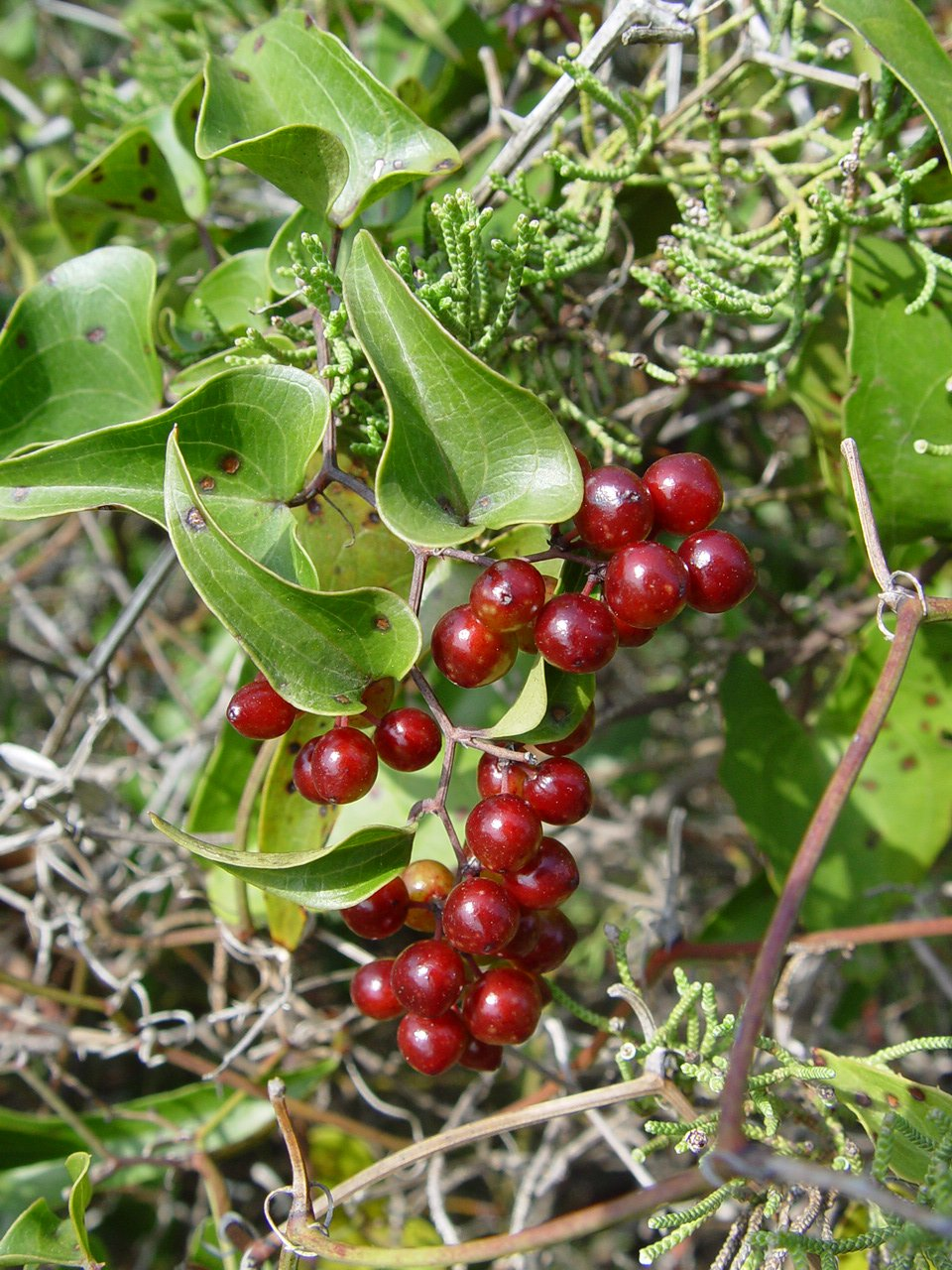
Smilax aspera (Smilaceae)

In post-Linnaean usage, Coronariae corresponds to the modern order Liliales (Lilies and allied taxa), the largest grouping of families within the monocot grade Lilioid monocots. The number of families remains about the same as Perleb's original construction. However, the circumscription of the order Liliales (and its nominative family Liliaceae) have undergone major changes over the years, particularly with the advent of molecular phylogenetics. As a consequence, Liliales is greatly reduced, although still a relatively large monocot order. At one stage the Lilaceae, sensu Lindley, which he called lilyworts in the vernacular, consisted of 133 genera and 1200 species. In this work he unhappily acknowledged the confusing array of different approaches to the classification of the Liliaceae, the lack of a clear definition, and the great diversity in the circumscription of the order, which had expanded vastly, with many subdivisions. As he saw it, the Liliaceae had already become a catch-all grouping, being "everything that does not belong to the other parts of the Lilial Alliance", but expressed hope that the future would reveal some characteristic that would group them better. In other words, he foresaw that Liliaceae would come to be regarded as paraphyletic.

Many of the families once considered to be part of this grouping are now considered to be in Asparagales, with the remainder in commelinids and Dioscoreales.

Liliales, sensu APG, consists of ten families:

- Alstroemeriaceae
- Campynemataceae
- Colchicaceae
- Corsiaceae
- Liliaceae
- Melanthiaceae
- Petermanniaceae
- Philesiaceae
- Ripogonaceae
- Smilacaceae

As such, it consists of about 67 genera and about 1,558 species. The bulk of the Liliales species are found in the very diverse family Liliaceae (16 genera, 610 species). Of the remaining nine families, three are referred to as the vine families (Ripogonaceae, Philesiaceae and Smilacaceae) and form a cluster. Many of these families are very small or monotypic.

== Bibliography ==
Books and symposia

- Christenhusz, Maarten J. M.; Fay, Michael F.; Chase, Mark W. (2017). "Lilkiales". Plants of the World: An Illustrated Encyclopedia of Vascular Plants. University of Chicago Press. pp. 141–150. ISBN 978-0-226-52292-0.
- Cronquist, A (1981). An integrated system of classification of flowering plants. New York: Columbia University Press. ISBN 0-231-03880-1.
- Hutchinson, John (1973). "Liliales". The families of flowering plants, arranged according to a new system based on their probable phylogeny. 2 vols (3rd ed.). Oxford University Press. p. 591.
- Kubitzki, Klaus; Huber, Herbert, eds. (1998). The families and genera of vascular plants. Vol.3. Flowering plants. Monocotyledons: Lilianae (except Orchidaceae). Berlin, Germany: Springer-Verlag. ISBN 978-3-540-64060-8.
- Simpson, Michael G. (2011). "Liliales". Plant Systematics. Academic Press. p. 180. ISBN 978-0-08-051404-8.
- Stuessy, Tod F. (2009). Plant taxonomy: the systematic evaluation of comparative data (2nd ed.). New York: Columbia University Press. ISBN 978-0-231-51864-2.
- Takhtajan, Armen Leonovich (1997). Diversity and Classification of Flowering Plants. Columbia University Press. ISBN 978-0-231-10098-4.
- Wilson, K. L.; Morrison, D. A., eds. (2000). Monocots: Systematics and evolution (Proceedings of the Second International Conference on the Comparative Biology of the Monocotyledons, Sydney, Australia 1998). Collingwood, Australia: CSIRO. ISBN 0-643-06437-0. Excerpts.

Historical sources

- Agardh, Carl Adolph (1825). "XI. Liliiflorae". Classes Plantarum (in Latin). Lund: Literis Berlingianis. p. 8.
- Bentham, G.; Hooker, J.D. (1883). "Coronariae". Genera plantarum ad exemplaria imprimis in herbariis kewensibus servata definita. vol. 3 (in Latin). London: L Reeve & Co. pp. ix–x.
- Eichler, August W. (1886) [1876]. Syllabus der Vorlesungen über specielle und medicinisch-pharmaceutische Botanik (4th ed.). Berlin: Borntraeger.
- Endlicher, Stephanus (1836). "Coronariae". Genera plantarum secundum ordines naturales disposita (in Latin). Vindobonae: Apud Fr.Beck. pp. 129–157.
- Engler, Adolf (1903) [1892]. "Liliiflorae". Syllabus der Pflanzenfamilien: eine Übersicht über das gesamte Pflanzensystem mit Berücksichtigung der Medicinal- und Nutzpflanzen nebst einer Übersicht über die Florenreiche und Florengebiete der Erde zum Gebrauch bei Vorlesungen und Studien über specielle und medicinisch-pharmaceutische Botanik (3rd ed.). Berlin: Gebrüder Borntraeger Verlag. pp. 93–101.
- Lindley, John (1846). The Vegetable Kingdom: or, The structure, classification, and uses of plants, illustrated upon the natural system. London: Bradbury.
- Lindley, John (1853) [1846]. "Liliales". The Vegetable Kingdom: or, The structure, classification, and uses of plants, illustrated upon the natural system (3rd. ed.). London: Bradbury & Evans. pp. 195–206.
- Linnaeus, Carl (1755) [1751]. Philosophia botanica: in qua explicantur fundamenta botanica cum definitionibus partium, exemplis terminorum, observationibus rariorum, adiectis figuris aeneis (in Latin). originally published simultaneously by R. Kiesewetter (Stockholm) and Z. Chatelain (Amsterdam). Vienna: Joannis Thomae Trattner.
- Linnaeus, Carl (1792). "Ordo X Coronariae". In Giseke, Paul Dietrich (ed.). Praelectiones in ordines naturales plantarum. Hamburg: Benj. Gottl. Hoffmanni. pp. 283–293.
- Lotsy, J. P. (1911). Vorträge über botanische stammesgeschichte, gehalten an der Reichsuniversität zu Leiden. Ein lehrbuch der pflanzensystematick. III Cormophyta Siphonogamia. Jena: G. Fischer. pp. 715–766, 792–834.
- — (1826). Lehrbuch der Naturgeschichte des Pflanzenreichs. Freiburg im Breisgau: Friedrich Wagner. p. 129.
- Ray, John (1660). Catalogus plantarum circa Cantabrigiam nascentium ...: Adiiciuntur in gratiam tyronum, index Anglico-latinus, index locorum ... [Catalogue of Cambridge plants] (in Latin). Cambridge: John Field. (Appendices 1663, 1685).

Chapters

- Kubitzki, K; Rudall, PJ; Chase, MC. Systematics and evolution: A brief history of monocot classification. p. 23., in Kubitzki & Huber (1998).
- Rudall, P. J.; Stobart, K. L.; Hong, W-P.; Conran, J. G.; Furness, C. A.; Kite, G. C.; Chase, M. W. (2000). Consider the lilies: systematics of Liliales. Csiro. pp. 347–359. ISBN 9780643099296., in Wilson & Morrison (2000).

Encyclopaedias

- Smith, James Edward (1824). "Botany". Encyclopaedia Britannica: Supplement to the 4th, 5th, and 6th Editions With Preliminary Dissertations on the History of the Sciences. vol. 2. Edinburgh: Archibald. pp. 376–422.
- Rees, Abraham (1819). "Coronariae". The Cyclopaedia; Or, Universal Dictionary of Arts, Sciences and Literature. vol. X. London: Longman, Hurst. p. 3.. See also Rees's Cyclopædia.
- Traub, Hamilton P; Kress, WJ (2016). "Liliales". Encyclopædia Britannica.

Articles

- Angiosperm Phylogeny Group IV (2016). "An update of the Angiosperm Phylogeny Group classification for the orders and families of flowering plants: APG IV". Botanical Journal of the Linnean Society. 181 (1): 1–20. doi:10.1111/boj.12385.
- Bentham, George (February 1877). "On the Distribution of the Monocotyledonous Orders into Primary Groups, more especially in reference to the Australian Flora, with notes on some points of Terminology". Journal of the Linnean Society of London, Botany. 15 (88): 490–520. doi:10.1111/j.1095-8339.1877.tb00261.x.
- Givnish, Thomas J.; Zuluaga, Alejandro; Marques, Isabel; Lam, Vivienne K. Y.; Gomez, Marybel Soto; Iles, William J. D.; Ames, Mercedes; Spalink, Daniel; Moeller, Jackson R.; Briggs, Barbara G.; Lyon, Stephanie P.; Stevenson, Dennis W.; Zomlefer, Wendy; Graham, Sean W. (December 2016). "Phylogenomics and historical biogeography of the monocot order Liliales: out of Australia and through Antarctica". Cladistics. 32 (6): 581–605. doi:10.1111/cla.12153. PMID 34727673. S2CID 44059188.
- Thorne, Robert F.; Reveal, James L. (April 2007). "An Updated Classification of the Class Magnoliopsida ("Angiospermae")". The Botanical Review. 73 (2): 67–181. doi:10.1663/0006-8101(2007)73[67:AUCOTC]2.0.CO;2. S2CID 24415895.
