= Uvulariaceae =

Family of flowering plants

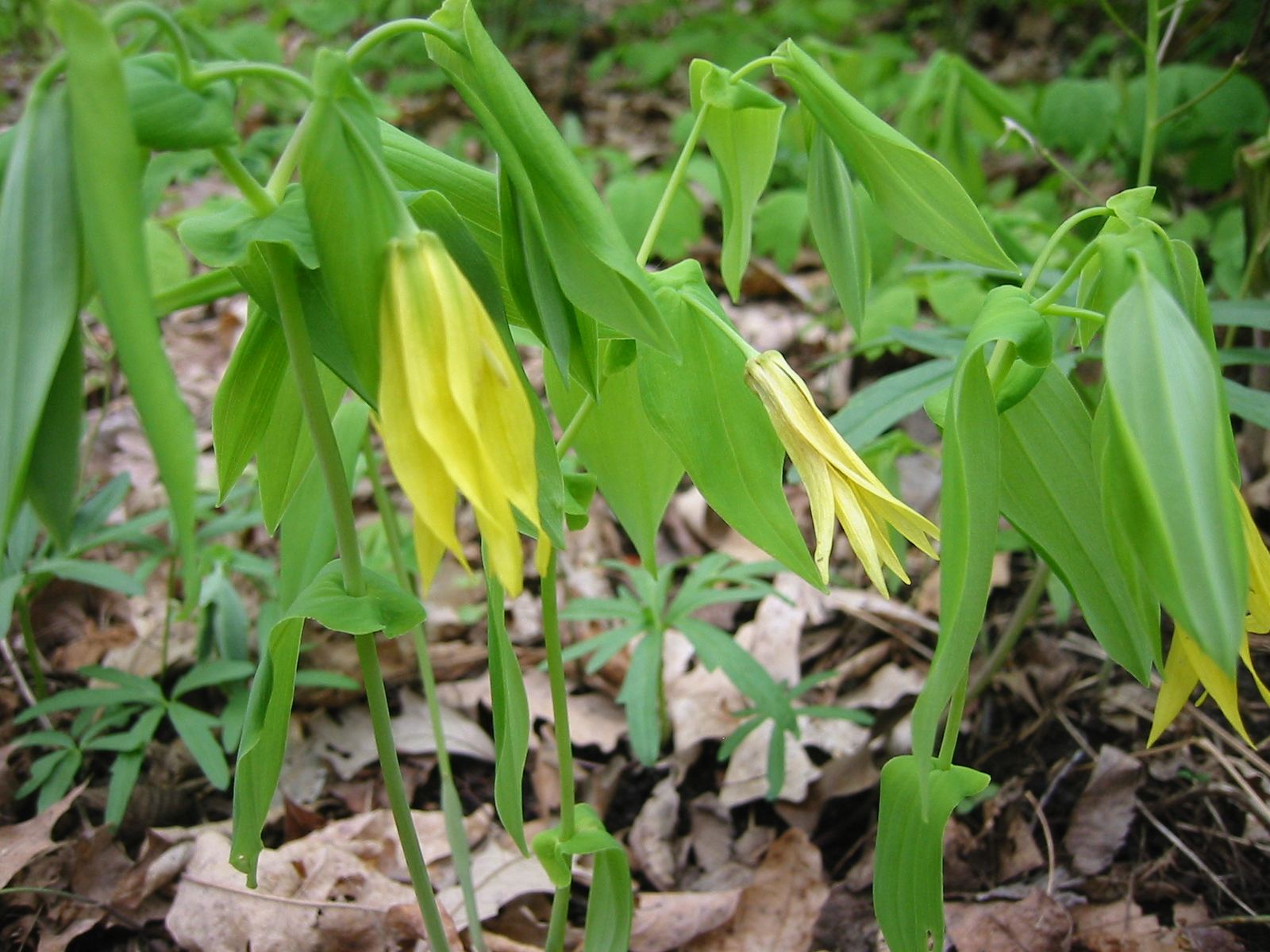
Uvularia grandiflora

Uvulariaceae is a family of flowering plants. While seldom recognised, the family is accepted by the Dahlgren system, which places it in order Liliales, superorder Lilianae, and the subclass Liliidae [=monocotyledons] of class Magnoliopsida [=angiosperms].

The APG II system places the genus Uvularia in family Colchicaceae, which is assigned to order Liliales in the clade monocots.

Molecular studies have shown that Uvulariaceae is polyphyletic, meaning that the genera placed in the family have closer relationships with other plants than with each other. The family have been split and the genera Disporum, Kuntheria, Schelhammera, Tripladenia and Uvularia are now placed in the autumn crocus family (Colchicaceae), while Clintonia, Medeola, Prosartes, Scoliopus and Streptopus are placed in the lily family (Liliaceae). The genus Kreysigia has a somewhat troublesome taxonomic history and is either synonymous to Tripladenia or Schelhammera (which, together with Kuntheria should perhaps all be treated as Schelhammera).
