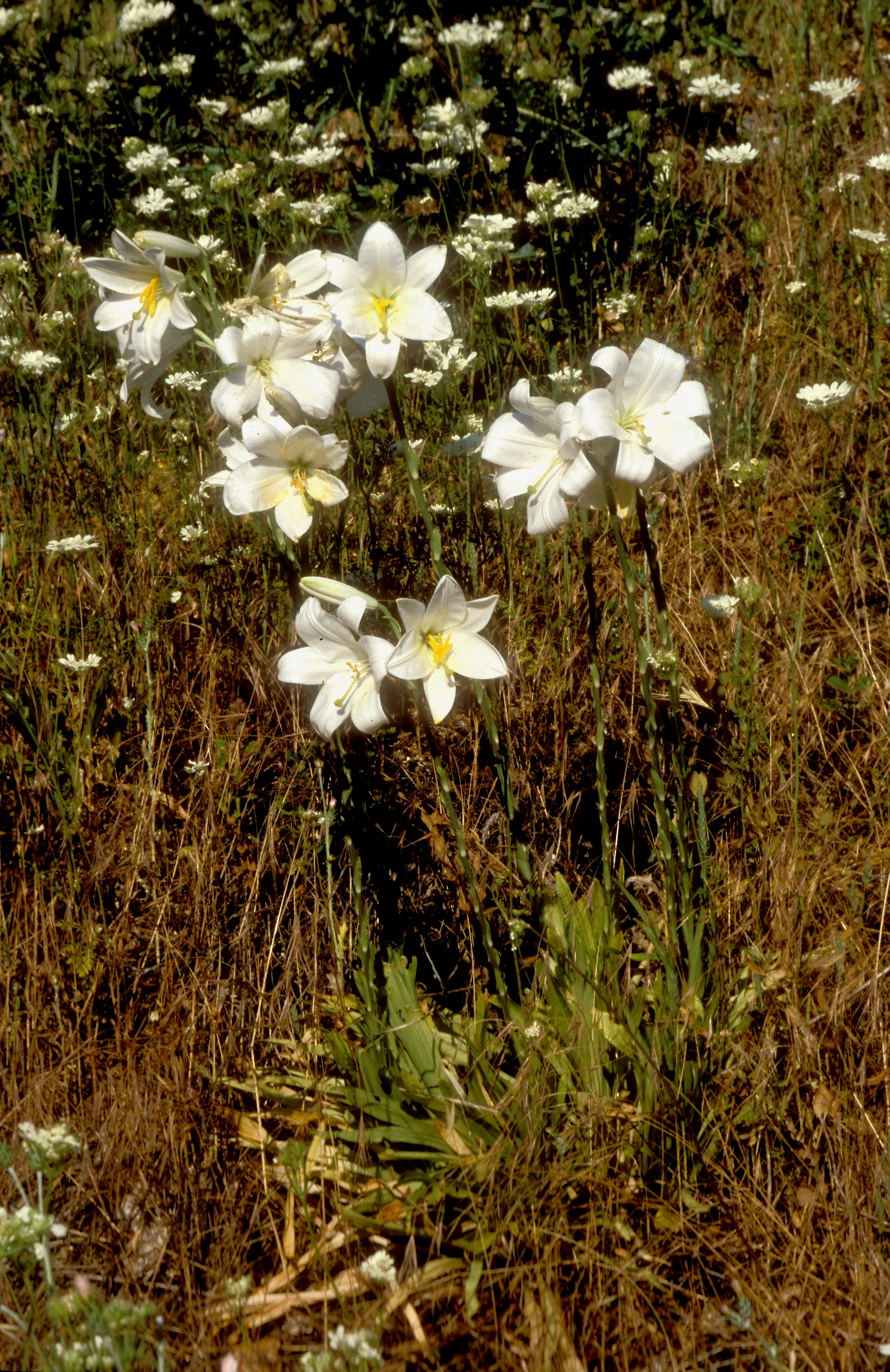
- Lilium candidum

Scientific classification
- Kingdom: Plantae
- Clade: Embryophytes
- Clade: Tracheophytes
- Clade: Angiosperms
- Clade: Monocots
- Order: Liliales; Perleb (1826)

Type species
- Lilium candidum L.

Families
- Alstroemeriaceae; Campynemataceae; Colchicaceae; Corsiaceae; Liliaceae; Melanthiaceae; Petermanniaceae; Philesiaceae; Ripogonaceae; Smilacaceae

Synonyms
- Liliiflora

= Liliales =

Liliales Temporal range: 120–0 Ma Early Cretaceous- Recent

Order of monocot flowering plants, including lilies

Liliales is an order of monocotyledonous flowering plants in the Angiosperm Phylogeny Group and Angiosperm Phylogeny Web system, within the lilioid monocots. This order of necessity includes the family Liliaceae. The APG III system (2009) places this order in the monocot clade. In APG III, the family Luzuriagaceae is combined with the family Alstroemeriaceae and the family Petermanniaceae is recognized. Both the order Lililiales and the family Liliaceae have had a widely disputed history, with the circumscription varying greatly from one taxonomist to another. Previous members of this order, which at one stage included most monocots with conspicuous tepals and lacking starch in the endosperm are now distributed over three orders, Liliales, Dioscoreales and Asparagales, using predominantly molecular phylogenetics. The newly delimited Liliales is monophyletic, with ten families. Well known plants from the order include Lilium (lily), tulip, the North American wildflower Trillium, and greenbrier.

Thus circumscribed, this order consists mostly of herbaceous plants, but lianas and shrubs also occur. They are mostly perennial plants, with food storage organs such as corms or rhizomes. The family Corsiaceae is notable for being heterotrophic.

The order has worldwide distribution. The larger families (with more than 100 species) are roughly confined to the Northern Hemisphere, or are distributed worldwide, centering on the north. On the other hand, the smaller families (with up to 10 species) are confined to the Southern Hemisphere, or sometimes just to Australia or South America. The total number of species in the order is now about 1768.

As with any herbaceous group, the fossil record of the Liliales is rather scarce. There are several species from the Eocene, such as Petermanniopsis anglesaensis or Smilax, but their identification is not definite. Another known fossil is Ripogonum scandens from the Miocene. Due to the scarcity of data, it seems impossible to determine precisely the age and the initial distribution of the order. It is assumed that the Liliales originate from the Lower Cretaceous, over 100 million years ago. Fossil aquatic plants from the Cretaceous of northeastern Brazil and a new terrestrial species placed in the new genus Cratosmilax suggest that the first species have appeared around 120 million years ago when the continents formed Pangea, before dispersing as Asia, Africa and America. The initial diversification to the current families took place between 82 and 48 million years ago. The order consists of 10 families, 67 genera and about 1,768 species.

== Description ==
The Liliales are a diverse order of predominantly perennial erect or twining herbaceous and climbing plants. Climbers, such as the herbaceous Gloriosa (Colchicaceae) and Bomarea (Alstroemeriaceae), are common in the Americas in temperate and tropical zones, while most species of the subtropical and tropical genus Smilax (Smilacaceae) are herbaceous or woody climbers and comprise much of the vegetation within the Liliales range. They also include woody shrubs, which have fleshy stems and underground storage or perennating organs, mainly bulbous geophytes, sometimes rhizomatous or cormous. Leaves are elliptical and straplike with parallel venation or ovate with palmate veins and reticulate minor venation (Smilacaceae). In Alstroemeria and Bomarea (Alstroemeriaceae) the leaves are resupinate (twisted).

Liliales

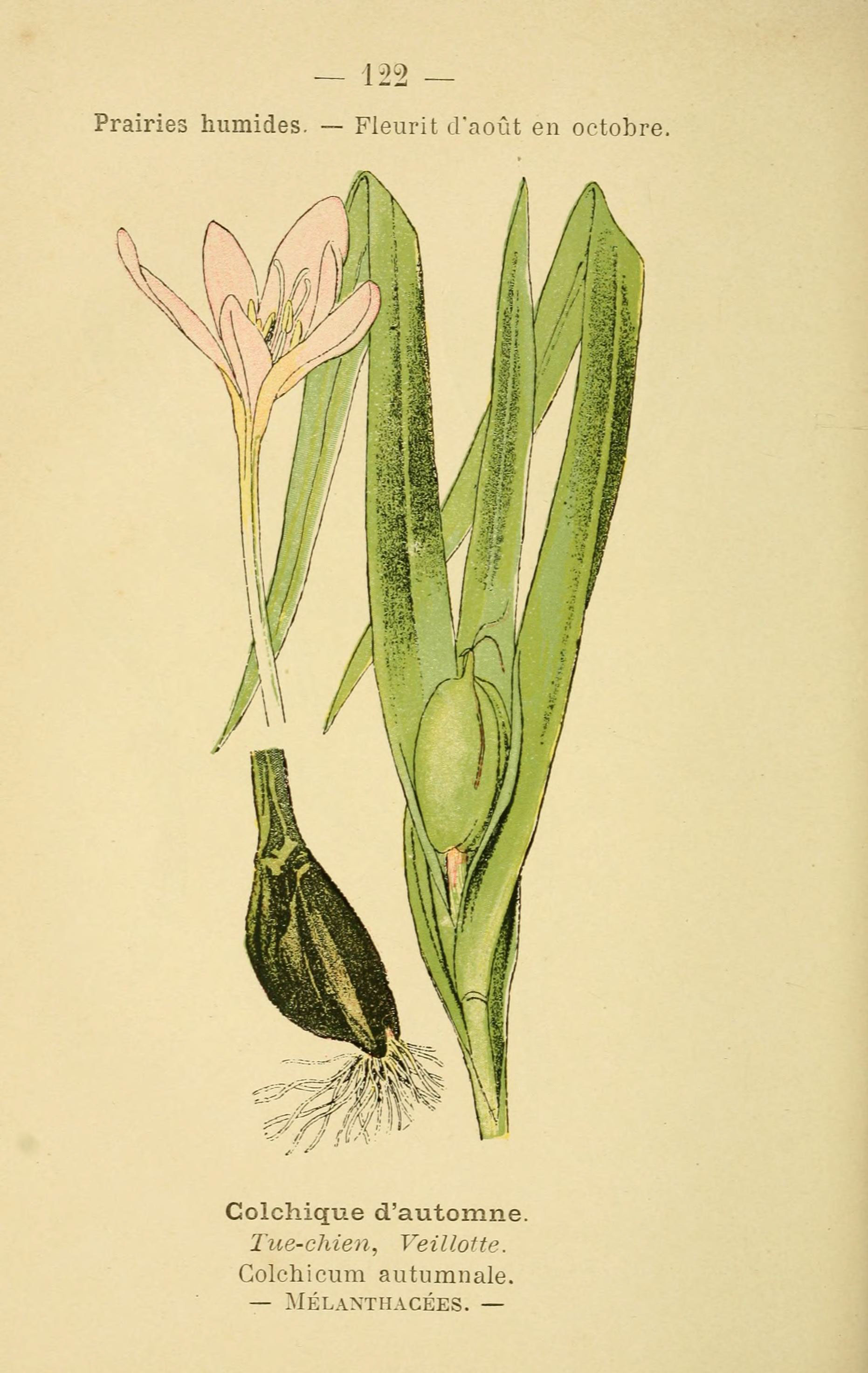
Colchicum autumnale (Colchicaceae)

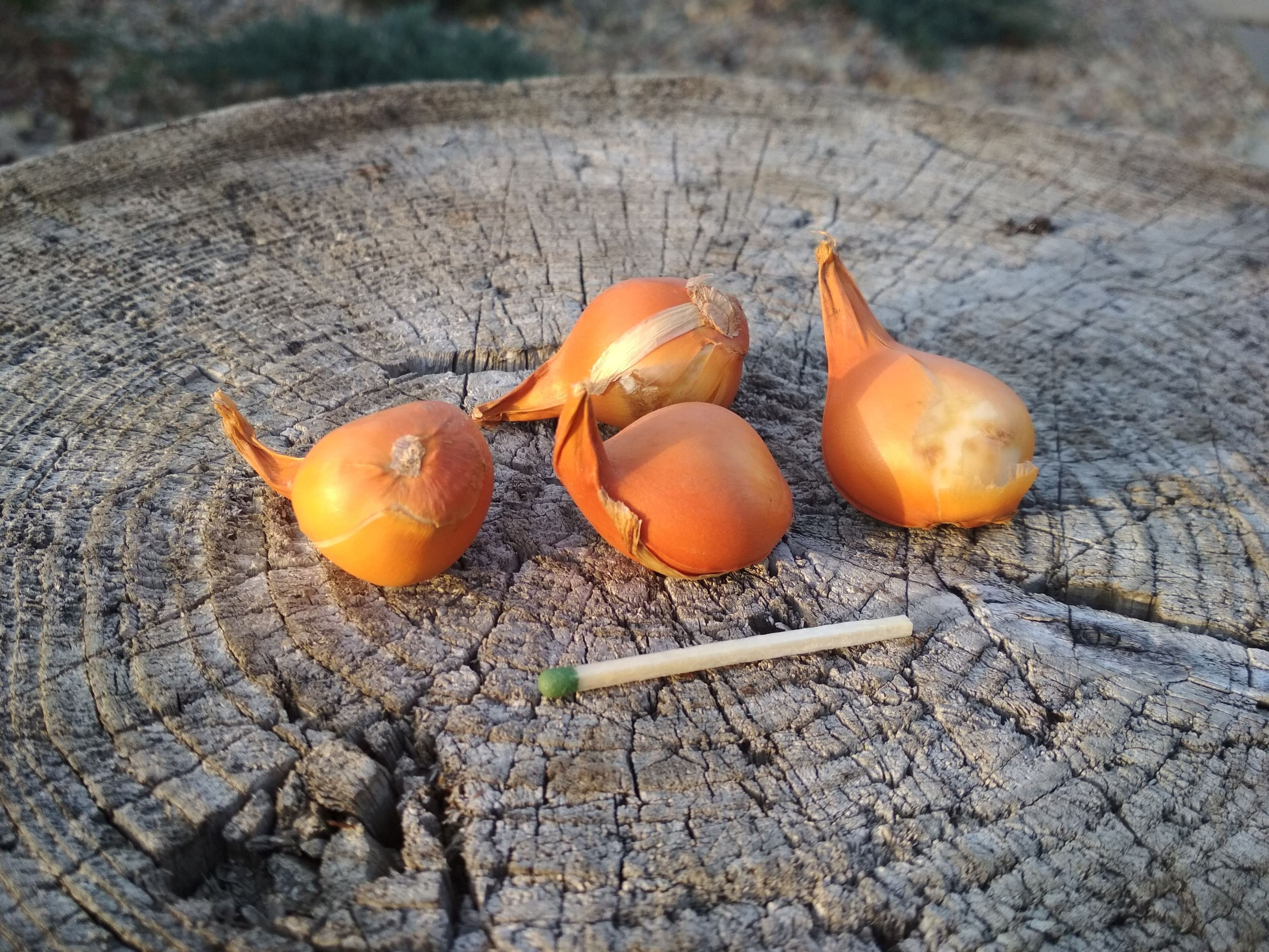
Tulipa humilis (Liliaceae):
Bulbs

Floral morphology

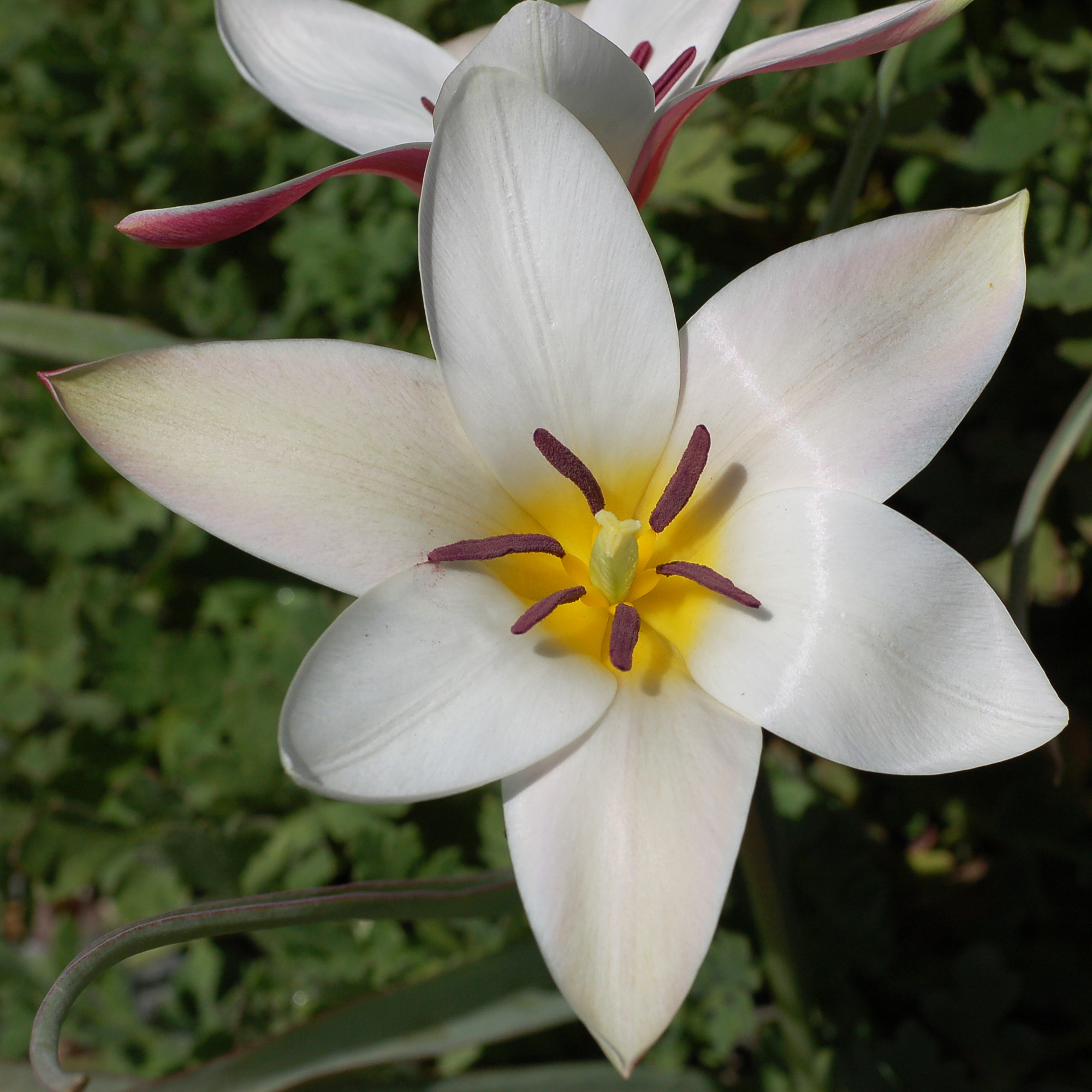
Tulipa clusiana (Liliaceae):
Six undifferentiated tepals

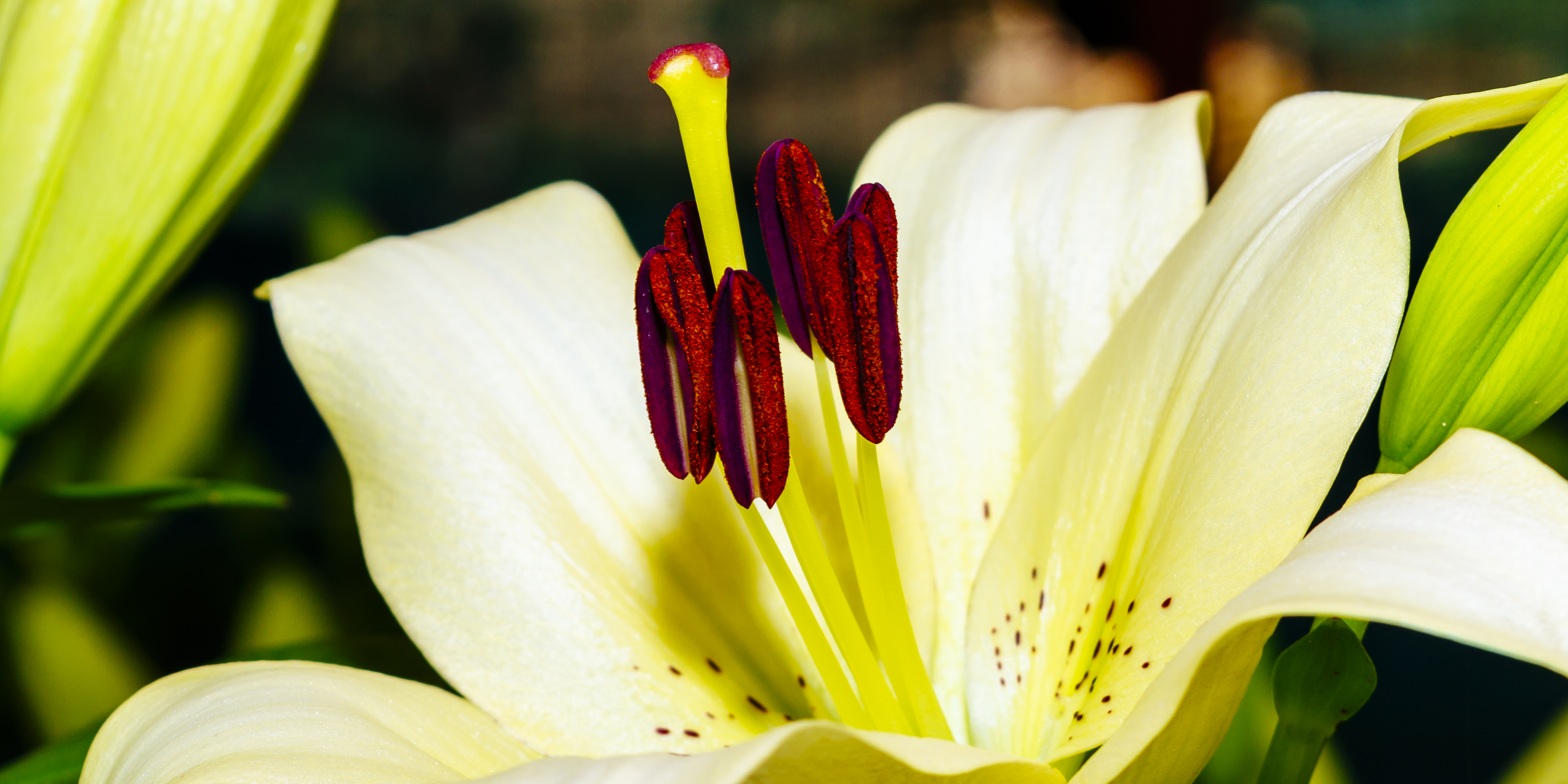
Lilium (Liliaceae):
Stigma, style, stamens (anthers, filaments) and tepals

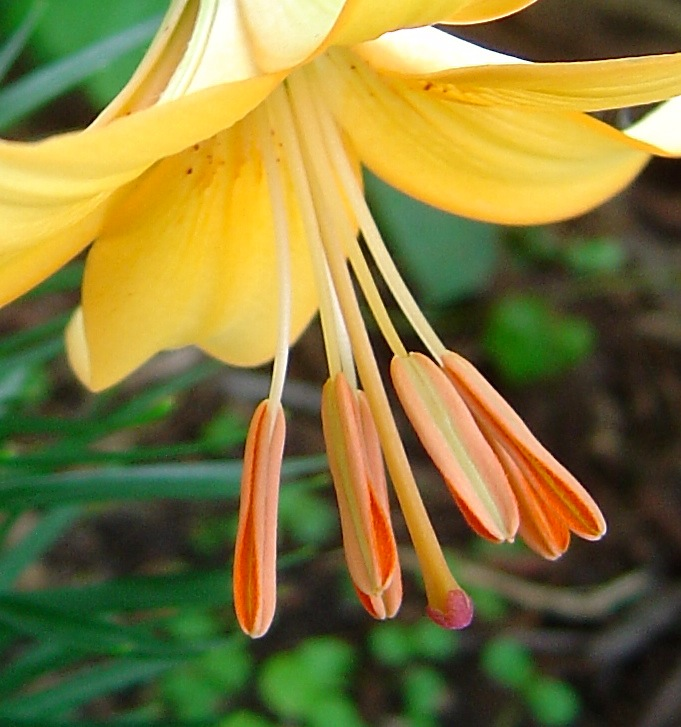
Lilium:
Extrorse anthers

The flowers are highly variable, ranging in size from the small green actinomorphic (radially symmetric) blooms of Smilax to the large showy ones found in Lilium, Tulipa and Calochortus (Liliaceae) and Lapageria (Philesiaceae). Sepals and petals are undifferentiated from each other, and known as tepals, forming a perianth. They are usually large and pointed and may be variegated in Fritillaria (Liliaceae). Nectaries may be perigonal (at base of tepals) but not septal (on ovaries). Perigonal nectaries may be a simple secretory epidermal region at the tepal bases (Lapageria) or small, depressed regions fringed with hairs, often with glandular surface protuberances, at the bases of the inner tepals (Calochortus), while in Tricyrtis the tepals become bulbous or spur-like at the base, forming a nectar-containing sac. Ovaries may be inferior or superior, the style often long and stigma capitate (pin headed). In a number of taxa there are three separate styles, particularly some Melanthiaceae s.l. (e.g. Helonias, Trillium, Veratrum) and Chamaelirium (former Chionographis species). The outer integument epidermis of the seed coat is cellular, and the phytomelanin pigment is lacking. The inner integument is also cellular and these features are plesiomorphic.

The Liliales are characterised by (synapomorphies) the presence of nectaries at the base of the tepals (perigonal nectaries) or stamen filaments (Colchicum, Androcymbium) most taxa but the absence of septal nectaries, together with extrorse (outward opening) anthers. This distinguishes them from the septal nectaries and introrse anthers that are the features of most other monocots. Exceptions are some Melanthiaceae in which nectaries are absent or septal and anthers that are introrse (dehiscence directed inwards) in Campynemataceae, Colchicaceae, and some Alstroemeriaceae, Melanthiaceae, Philesiaceae, Ripogonaceae and Smilacaceae. Tepals are largely three-traced in net-veined taxa of Liliales (e.g. Clintonia, Disporum), distinguishing them from the single-traced Asparagales, and is associated with the presence of tepal nectaries, presumably to supply them. The presence of separate styles is also a distinguishing feature from Asparagales, where it is rare. Phytomelan is completely absent in Liliales seed coats, unlike Asparagales, which nearly all contain it.

=== Phytochemistry ===
The stems contain fructans, the plants also contain chelidonic acid, saponins, while some species contain velamen. The epicuticular wax is of the Convallaria type, consisting of parallel orientated platelets.

=== Genome ===
The order includes taxa with some of the largest genomes among Angiosperms, particularly Melanthiaceae, Alstroemeriaceae and Liliaceae.

== Taxonomy ==
With 11 families, about 67 genera and about 1,558 species, Liliales is a relatively small angiosperm order, but a large group within the monocotyledons.

=== History ===
==== Origins ====
The botanical authority for Liliales is given to Perleb (1826), who grouped eleven families (Asparageae, Pontederiaceae, Asphodeleae, Coronariae, (Note: Coronariae used sensu Agardh (1825), that is corresponding to Linnaeus' Liliaceae) Colchicaceae, Dioscoreaceae, Hypoxideae, Amaryllideae, Haemodoraceae, Burmanniaceae, Irideae) into an order he called Liliaceae. In Perleb's system, he divided the vascular plants into seven classes, of which the Phanerogamicae or seed plants he called his class IV, or Ternariae. The latter, he divided into five orders (ordo), including the Liliaceae.

A number of later taxonomists, such as Endlicher (1836) substitituted the term Coronarieae for this higher order, including six subordinate taxa. Endlicher divided the Cormophyta into five sections, of which Amphibrya contained eleven classes, including Coronarieae. The term Liliales was introduced by Lindley (1853), referring to these higher orders as alliances. Lindley included four families in this alliance. Lindley called the monocots class Endogenae, with eleven alliances including Liliales. Although Bentham (1877) restored Coronariae as one of seven Series making up the monocotyledons, it was replaced by Liliiflorae and then Liliales in subsequent publications (see Table for history).

==== Phyletic systems ====
Subsequent authors, now adopting a phylogenetic (phyletic) or evolutionary approach over the natural method, did not follow Bentham's nomenclature. Eichler (1886) used Liliiflorae for the higher order including Liliaceae, placing it as the first order (Reihe) in his class monocotyledons, as did Engler (1903), Lotsy (1911), and Wettstein in 1924, in class Monocotyledones, subdivision Angiospermae.

Hutchinson (1973) restored Liliales for the higher rank, an approach that has been adopted by most major classification systems onwards, reserving Liliiflorae for higher ranks. These include Cronquist (1981), Dahlgren (1985), Takhtajan (1997) as well as Thorne and Reveal (2007).

Hutchinson (1973) derived a more elaborate hierarchy, placing order Liliales as one of 14 in division Corolliferae, one of three divisions of subphylum monocotyledons. Cronquist (1981) placed the order Liliales as one of two in subclass Liliidae, one of five in the class Liliopsida (monocotyledons) of division Magnoliophyta (angiosperms). Dahlgren (1985) made Liliales one of six orders in Superorder Liliiflorae, one of ten divisions of the monocots. Takhtajan (1997) had a more complex system of higher taxonomic ranks, placing Liliales as one of 15 orders within superorder Lilianae, one of four within subclass Liliidae. Liliidae in turn was one of four subclasses in class Liliopsida (monocots). In contrast Thorne and Reveal (2007) abandoned the use of monocotyledons as a distinct taxon, replacing it with 3 separate subclasses of Magnoliopsida (angiosperms), of which Liliidae consists of 3 superorders, placing Liliales in superorder Lilianae.

In all these systems, Liliales (or Liliiflorae) were visualised as either a direct division of the monocots (or equivalent) or were placed in an intermediate division of the monocots, such as superorder Lilianae.

==== Molecular phylogenetic systems ====
The development of molecular phylogenetic methods for determining taxonomic circumscription and phylogeny led to considerable revision of angiosperm classification, and establishment of Liliales as a monophyletic group. It was clear by 1996, that the most useful system to date, that of Dahlgren, required urgent revision. The new classification was formalised with the creation of the Angiosperm Phylogeny Group (APG) system (1998–2016), based on monophyletic clades, which continued the use of Liliales as the name for the taxon.

The Angiosperm Phylogeny Group APG system (1998) established a structure of monocot classification with ten orders. Notable was the separation of asparagids, as suggested by Dahlgren, into Asparagales, with other taxa placed in Dioscoreales, resulting in a much reduced order.

=== Phylogeny ===
The position of Liliales within the monocots (Lilianae) is shown in the following cladogram. The monocot orders form three grades, the alismatid monocots, lilioid monocots and the commelinid monocots by order of branching, from early to late. These have alternatively been referred to as Alismatanae, Lilianae and Commelinanae. The alismatid monocots form the basal group, while the remaining grades (lilioid and commelinid monocots) have been referred to as the "core monocots". The relationship between the orders (with the exception of the two sister orders) is pectinate, that is diverging in succession from the line that leads to the commelinids. The lilioid monocot orders constitute a paraphyletic assemblage, that is groups with a common ancestor that do not include all direct descendants (in this case commelinids which are a sister group to Asparagales); to form a clade, all the groups joined by thick lines would need to be included. In the cladogram the numbers indicate crown group (most recent common ancestor of the sampled species of the clade of interest) divergence times in mya (million years ago).

Cladogram 1: The phylogenetic composition of the monocots

- Lilianae sensu Chase & Reveal (monocots) 131
  - - - Acorales
      - - Alismatales
        - 122
          - Petrosaviales
          - - 120
              - Dioscoreales 115
              - Pandanales 91
            - - Liliales 121
              - 121
                - Asparagales 120
                - commelinids 118
                  - Arecales
                  - Poales
                  - - Commelinales
                    - Zingiberales

=== Biogeography and evolution ===
The crown group of Liliales has been dated to ca. 117 Myr (million years ago) in the Early Cretaceous period of the Mesozoic era.

=== Subdivision ===
The circumscription of Liliales has varied greatly since Perleb's original construction with 11 families in 1826. Many of these families are now considered to be in Asparagales, with the remainder in commelinids and Dioscoreales, as shown in this table.

Liliales families in progressive taxonomic schemes

Perleb (1826)	Endlicher (1836)	Lindley (1853)	Bentham & Hooker (1883)	Eichler (1886)	Engler (1903)	Lotsy (1911)	Wettstein (1924)	Hutchinson (1973)	Cronquist (1981)	Dahlgren (1985)	Takhtajan (1997)	Thorne & Reveal (2007)	APG IV (2016)
Liliaceae	Coronarieae	Liliales	Coronariae	Liliiflorae	Liliiflorae	Liliiflorae	Liliiflorae	Liliales	Liliales	Liliales	Liliales	Liliales	Liliales
Asparageae^{A}						Asparagaceae							
Asphodeleae^{A}						Asphodelaceae							
Colchicaceae										Colchicaceae		Colchicaceae	Colchicaceae
Coronariae	Liliaceae	Liliaceae	Liliaceae	Liliaceae	Liliaceae	Liliaceae	Liliaceae	Liliaceae	Liliaceae	Liliaceae	Liliaceae	Liliaceae	Liliaceae
Amaryllideae^{A}					Amaryllidaceae	Amaryllidaceae	Amaryllidaceae						
Pontederiaceae^{c}	Pontederiaceae	Pontederiaceae	Pontederiaceae				Pontederiaceae	Pontederiaceae	Pontederiaceae				
Dioscoreaceae^{D}				Dioscoreaceae	Dioscoreaceae	Dioscoreaceae	Dioscoreaceae		Dioscoreaceae				
Hypoxideae^{A}						Hypoxidaceae							
Haemodoraceae^{c}				Haemodoraceae	Haemodoraceae	Haemodoraceae	Haemodoraceae		Haemodoraceae				
Burmanniaceae^{D}						Burmanniaceae	Burmanniaceae						
Irideae^{A}				Iridaceae	Iridaceae	Iridaceae	Iridaceae		Iridaceae	Iridaceae			
	Juncaceae^{c}			Juncaceae	Juncaceae	Juncaceae	Juncaceae						
	Philydriae^{c}		Philydraceae				Philydraceae		Philydraceae				
	Melanthaceae	Melanthaceae	Melanthaceae			Melanthiaceae						Melanthiaceae	Melanthiaceae
	Smilaceae					Smilaceae		Smilacaceae	Smilacaceae			Smilacaceae	Smilacaceae
		Gilliesiaceae^{A}				Gilliesiaceae							
			Roxburghiaceae^{P}		Stemonaceae	Stemonaceae	Stemonaceae		Stemonaceae				
			Xyrideae^{c}										
			Mayaceae^{c}										
			Commelinaceae^{c}										
			Rapateaceae^{c}				Rapateaceae						
				Bromeliaceae^{c}		Bromeliaceae|	Bromeliaceae						
					Velloziaceae^{P}	Vellosiaceae	Velloziaceae		Velloziaceae				
					Taccaceae^{D}	Taccaceae	Taccaceae		Taccaceae				
						Aloinaceae^{A}							
						Eriospermaceae^{A}							
						Johnsoniaceae^{A}							
						Agapanthaceae^{A}							
						Alliaceae^{A}							
						Tulipaceae							
						Scillaceae^{A}							
						Dracaenaceae^{A}							
						Luzuriagaceae						Luzuriagaceae	
						Ophiopogonaceae^{A}							
						Lomandraceae^{A}							
						Dasypogonaceae^{c}							
						Calectasiaceae^{c}							
						Flagellariaceae^{c}							
						Cyanastraceae^{c}	Cyanastraceae		Cyanastraceae				
						Agavaceae^{A}			Agavaceae				
								Tecophilaeaceae^{A}					
								Trilliaceae				Trilliaceae	(in Melanthiaceae)
								Ruscaceae^{A}					
									Xanthorrhoeaceae^{A}				
										Alstroemeriaceae		Alstroemeriaceae	Alstroemeriaceae
										Uvulariaceae			(in Colchicaceae; Liliaceae)
										Calochortaceae			(in Liliaceae)
										Geosiridaceae^{A}			
											Medeolaceae		(in Liliaceae)
												Corsiaceae	Corsiaceae
												Campynemataceae	Campynemataceae
												Petermanniaceae	Petermanniaceae
												Rhipogonaceae	Ripogonaceae
												Philesiaceae	Philesiaceae
Treatment of families in modern taxonomy (APG), remaining families included in Liliales: A: Asparagales c: commelinids D: Dioscoreales P: Pandanales

The availability of molecular phylogenetic methods suggested four main lineages within Liliales, and seven families;

1. Liliaceae group: Liliaceae (including some former Uvulariaceae and Calochortaceae), and Smilacaceae (including Ripogonaceae and Philesiaceae)
2. Campynemataceae
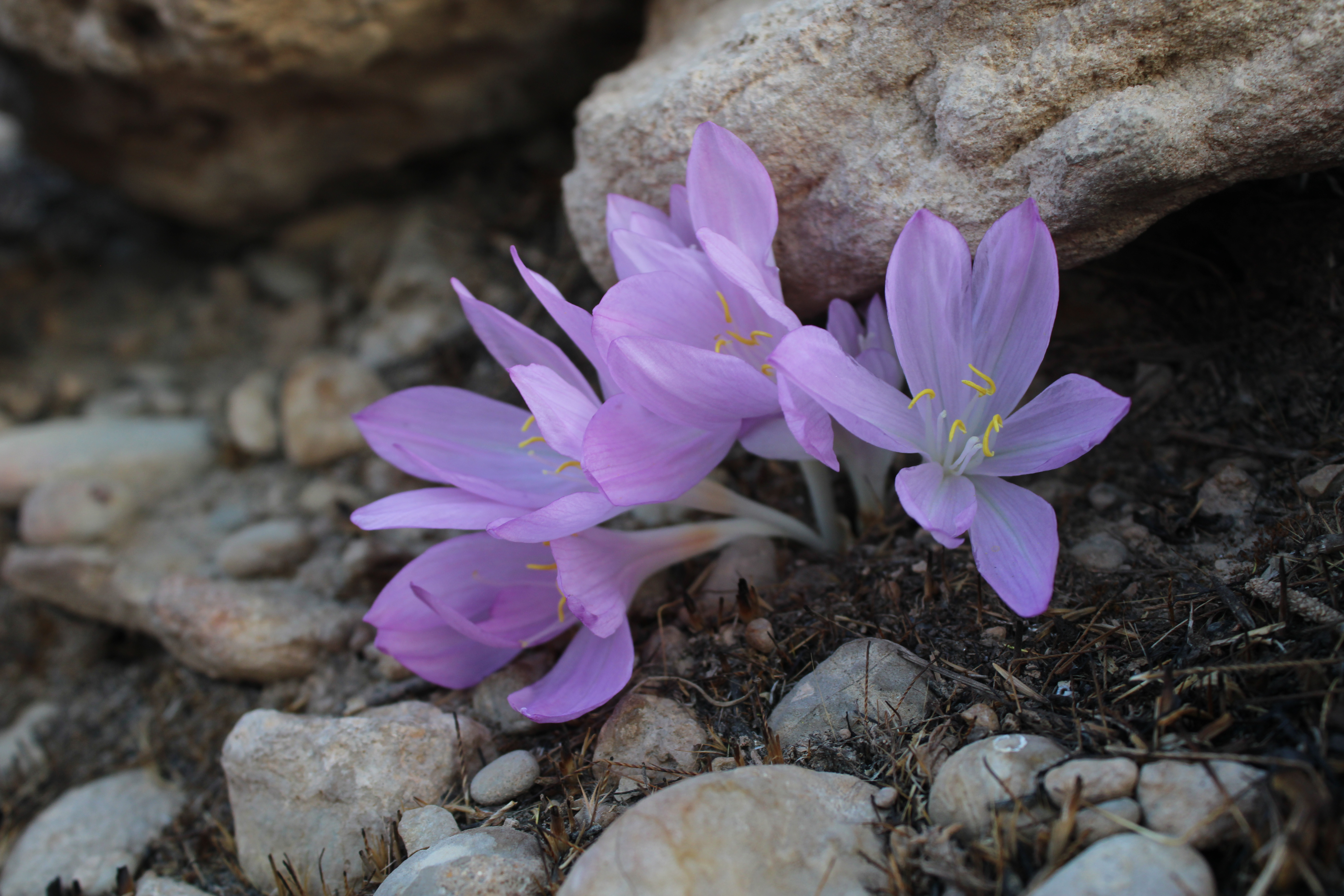
3. Colchicum Persicum Baker in Behbahan
  Colchicaceae group: Colchicaceae (including Petermannia and Uvularia), Alstroemeriaceae and Luzuriaga
4. Melanthiaceae (including Trilliaceae)

The first Angiosperm Phylogeny Group classification (APG I) in 1998 had the following circumscription, with 9 families, having separated Philesiaceae and Ripogonaceae from Smilacaceae:

- order Liliales
  family Alstroemeriaceae
  family Campynemataceae
  family Colchicaceae
  family Liliaceae
  family Luzuriagaceae
  family Melanthiaceae
  family Philesiaceae
  family Ripogonaceae
  family Smilacaceae

The APG II system (2003) added Corsiaceae to the Liliales, while APG III (2009) added Petermanniaceae and merged Luzuriagaceae into Alstroemeriaceae. The subsequent revision of APG IV (2016) left this unchanged, with 10 families.

The exact phylogenetic relationship between the families of Liliales has been subject to revision. This cladogram shows that of the Angiosperm Phylogeny Website (2020):

- Liliales
  - Campynemataceae
  - Corsiaceae
  - branch with 50–80% support
    - Melanthiaceae
    - - - Liliaceae
        - Smilacaceae
      - - Philesiaceae
        - Ripogonaceae
    - branch with 50–80% support
      - Petermanniaceae
      - - Colchicaceae
        - - Alstroemeriaceae
          - Luzuriagaceae

The bulk of the Liliales species are found in the family Liliaceae (16 genera, 610 species). Of the remaining nine families, three are referred to as the vine families (Ripogonaceae, Philesiaceae and Smilacaceae) and form a cluster.

=== Families ===
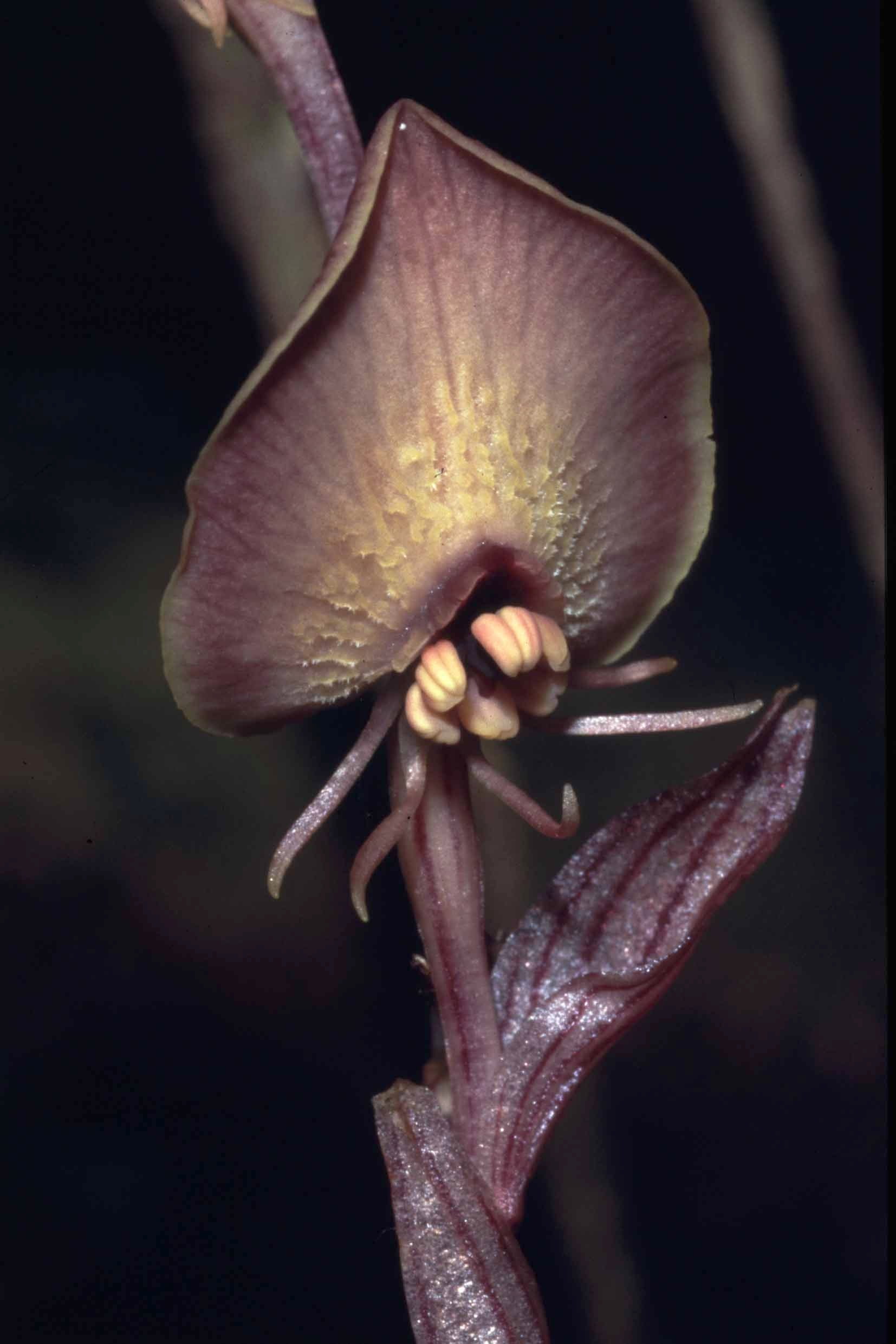
Corsia ornata

==== Corsiaceae ====
The Corsiaceae (ghost-flower family) are a family of 3 mycoheterotrophic genera, lacking chlorophyll, with 27 species of perennial herbaceous plants. They are found in montane forests in South America (one genus) and from southern China to northern Australia in areas with high rainfall, and among dense leaf litter. The majority of species occur in the type genus Corsia. The name commemorates the Florentine plant collector Marquis Bardo Corsi Salviati (1844–1907).

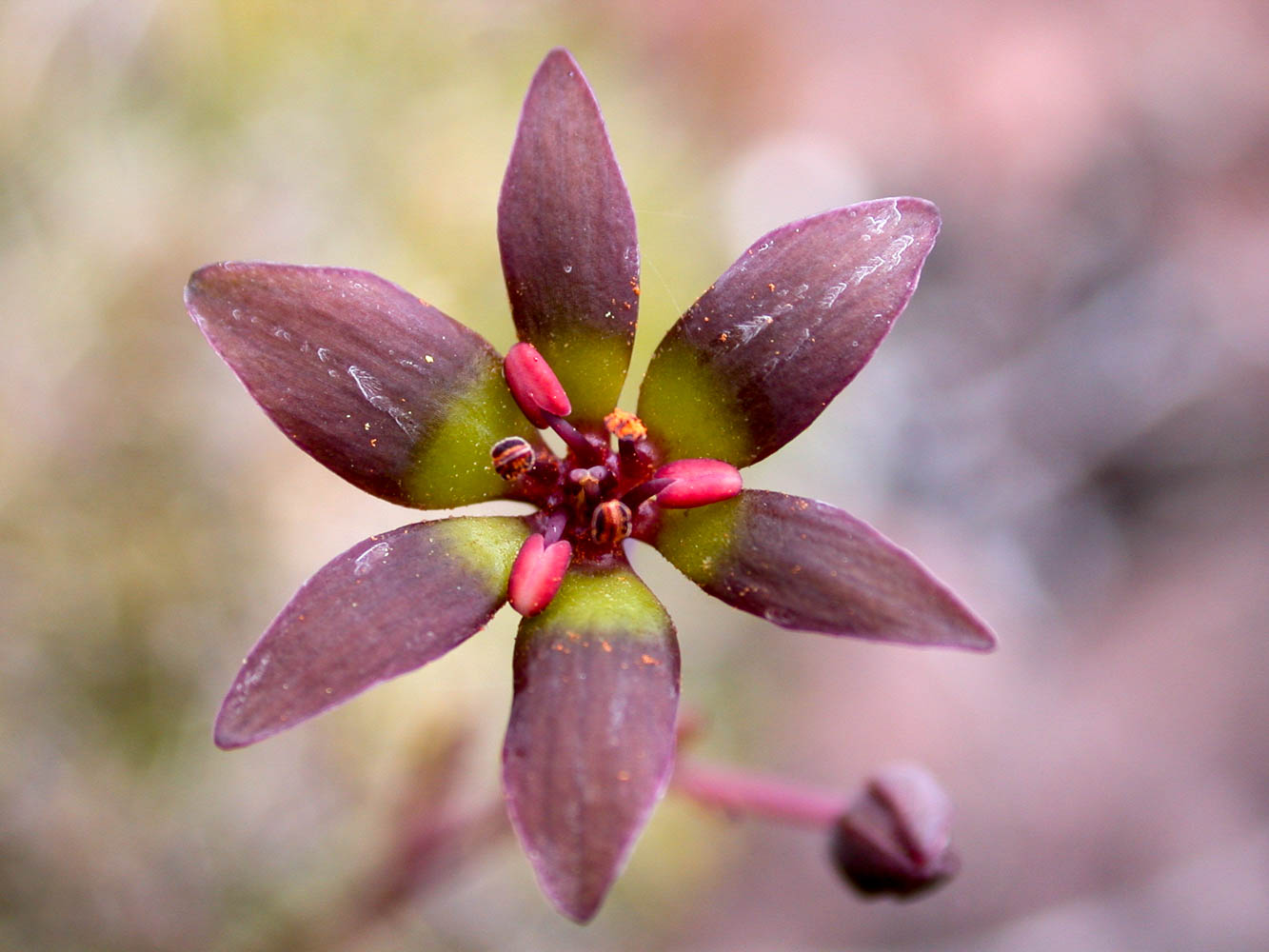
Campynema lineare

==== Campynemataceae ====
The Campynemataceae (Green-mountainlily family) are a family of two genera and four species of rhizomatous herbaceous plants found in Tasmania and New Caledonia. The name is derived from the Greek words kampylos (curved) and nema (thread).

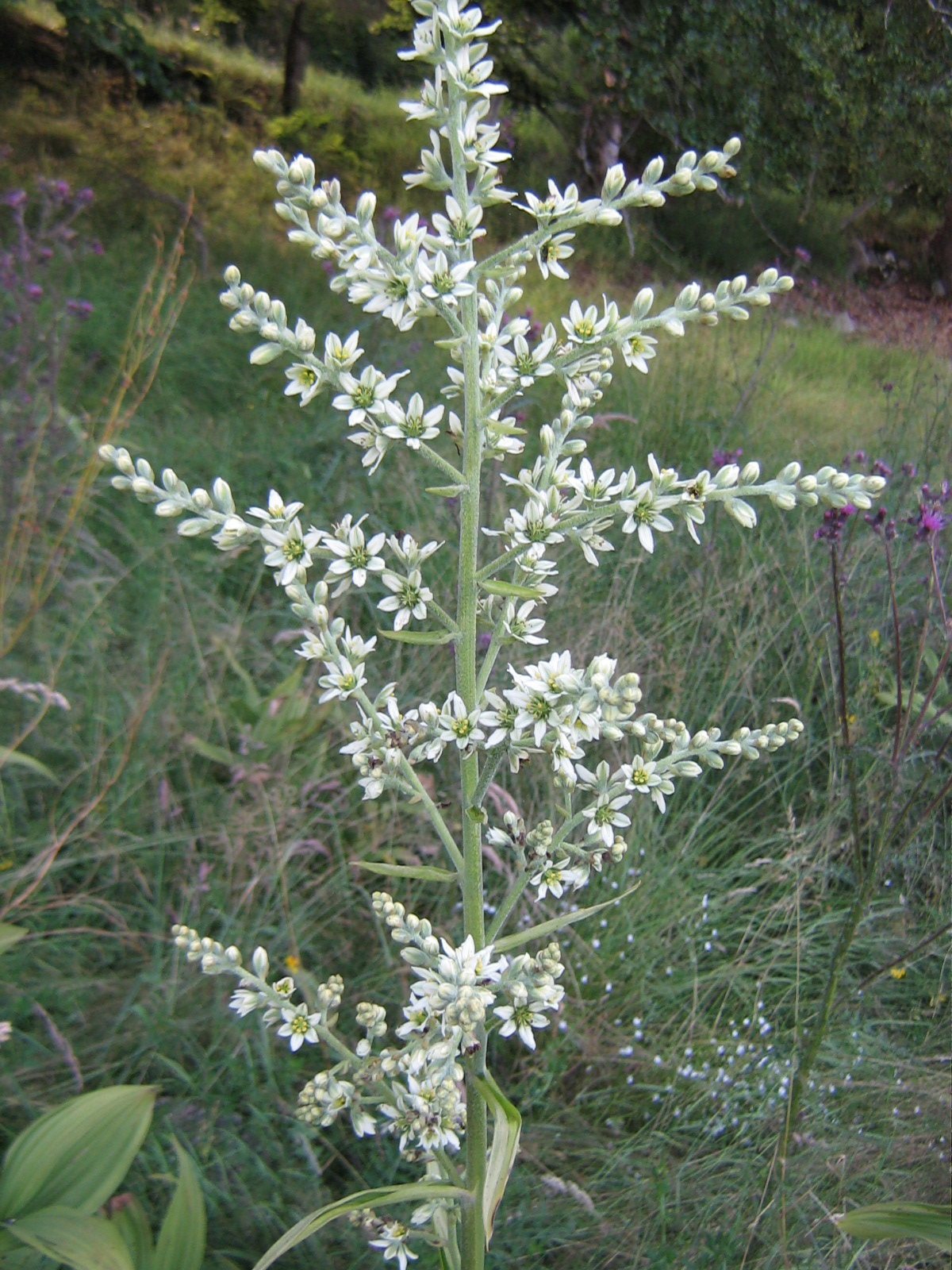
Veratrum album

==== Melanthiaceae ====
The Melanthiaceae (Wake Robin family) is a family of perennial herbaceous plants, whose storage organs include bulbs, rhizomes and corms (rarely, e.g. Schoenocaulon). Their distribution is temperate and boreal Northern hemisphere, in the Americas extending south to the Andes and in Asia to the Himalayas and Taiwan. Melanthiaceae consists of 17 genera and 173 species distributed in a number of subdivisions. The largest genus is Trillium (44 species) but many genera are monotypic. A number of genera, including Trillium are used as garden ornamentals, especially for woodland gardens. Paris japonica is noted for having the largest genome known to date. The family name is derived from the Greek words melas (black) and anthos (flower) in reference to the dark colour of the petals.

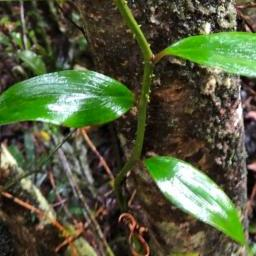
Petermannia cirrosa

==== Petermanniaceae ====
The Petermanniaceae (Petermann's vine family) consists of a single species, Petermannia cirrosa, a perennial woody vine with underground rhizomes. Petermannia is restricted to Queensland and New South Wales, in temperate rainforests between Brisbane and Sydney. The family was named for Wilhelm Ludwwig Petermann (1806–1855), director of the botanical garden at Leipzig.

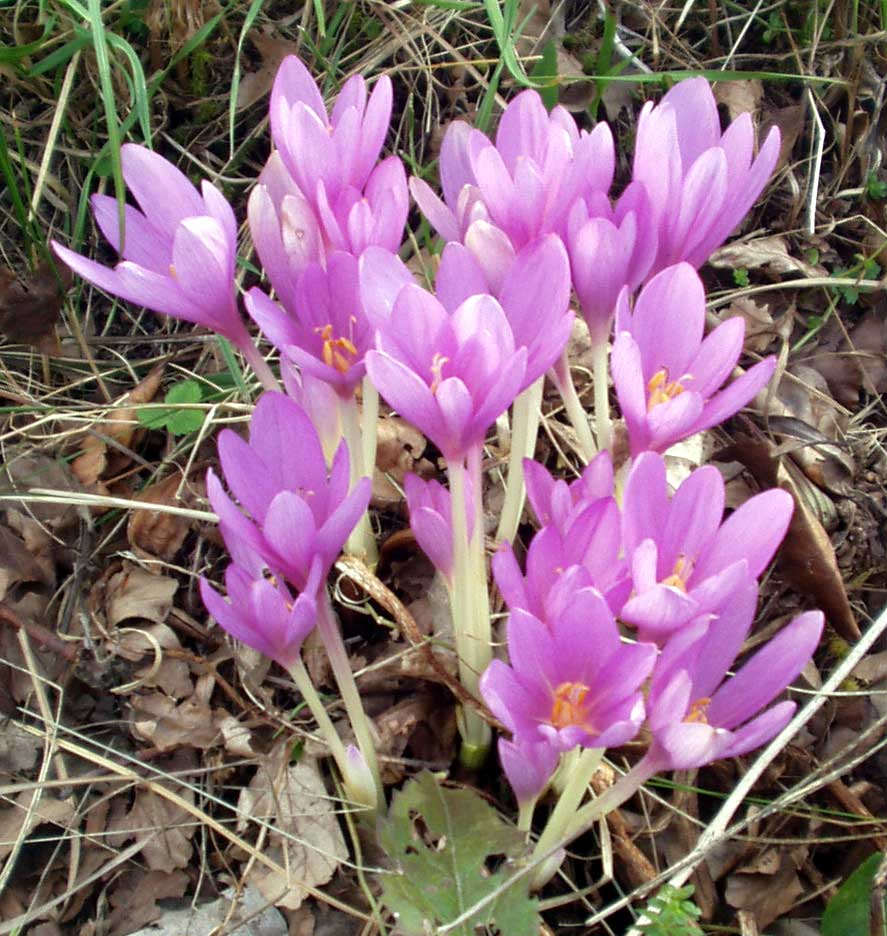
Colchicum autumnale

==== Colchicaceae ====
The Colchicaceae (Naked-ladies or Colchicum family) are perennial erect and climbing plants with underground corms, tubers and rhizomes. They are herbaceous with the exception of Kuntheria which has a somewhat woody stem. Their distribution is widespread including in temperate zones in North America, Europe, North Africa and the Middle east and tropical zones in Africa, Asia and Australasia. They are absent from South America. The family is of medium size with 15 genera and about 285 species. The largest genus is the type genus, Colchicum, with 159spp. Although the alkaloids, which characterise them, they contain are toxic to animals and humans, Colchicine has usage medicinally and in botanical laboratories. They are also include popular garden and indoor ornamentals. These include Colchicum and Gloriosa. The family is named after Colchis on the eastern Black Sea.

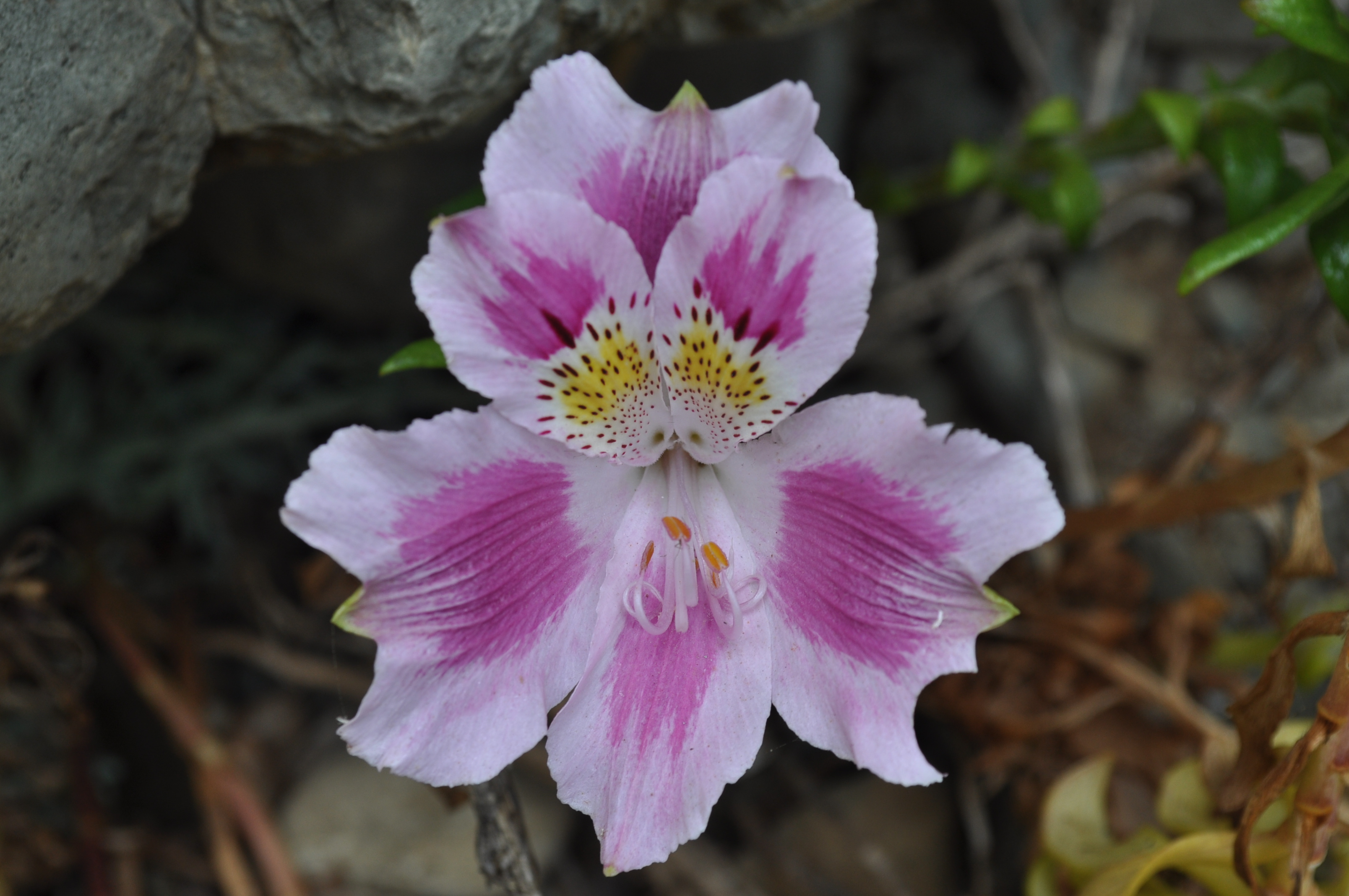
Alstroemeria pelegrina

==== Alstroemeriaceae ====
The Alstroemeriaceae (Inca-lily family) are erect or creeping perennial (rarely annual) herbaceous plants with occasional shrubby vines, some of which have evergreen stems. They are occasionally epiphytic and form often swollen rhizomes. They are found in tropical and temperate Central and South America, as well as Australasia. There are two large genera (Alstroemerieae), the erect Alstroemeria (S America 125 spp.) and twining Bomarea (Central & S America 122 spp.) and two genera (Luzuriageae) with 2 and 4 species each, for a total of 253 species in the family. Two species are widely used for food in S America, Alstroemeria ligtu is used for a flour (Chuño) that is extracted from its roots, while the tubers of Bomarea edulis are directly consumed. Luzuriaga radicans, also from S America, produces fibre used in rope making. Alstroemeria cultivars are popular ornamentals and widely used as cut flowers (Peruvian lilies). The family is named for Baron Clas Alströmer (1736–1794), a student of Linnaeus.

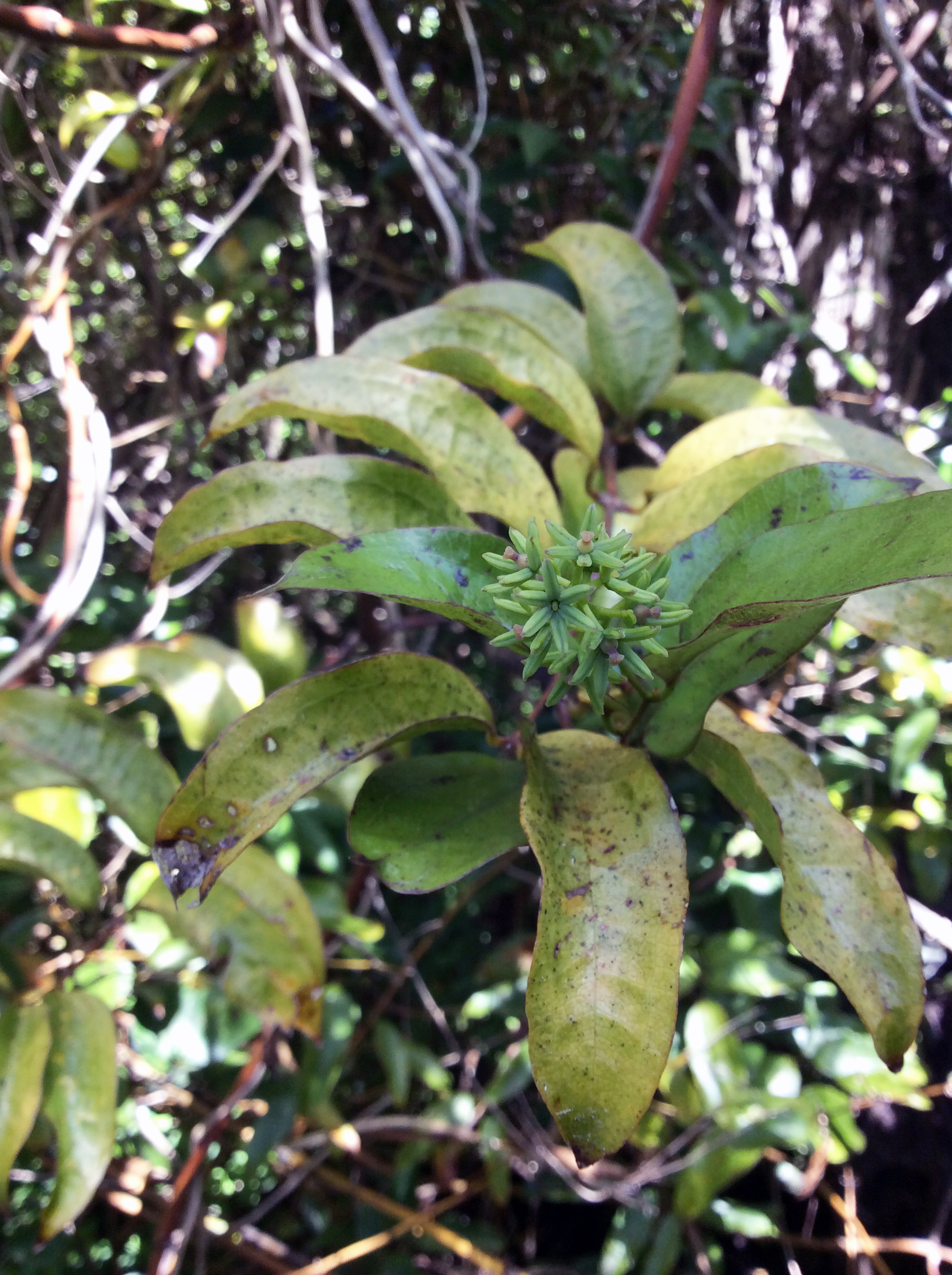
Ripogonum scandens

==== Ripogonaceae ====
The Ripogonaceae (Supplejack family) is a family with a single genus, Ripogonum, and six species. They are woody evergreen shrubs and vines arising from a horizontal rhizome, swollen at its base to form a tuber. They are confined to Eastern Australasia, with the type species, Ripogonum scandens as the sole New Zealand species. The stems have a use in basketry and building and the young shoots are edible. The name is derived from two Greek words, ripos (wicker) and gony (node) in reference to their node bearing shoots.

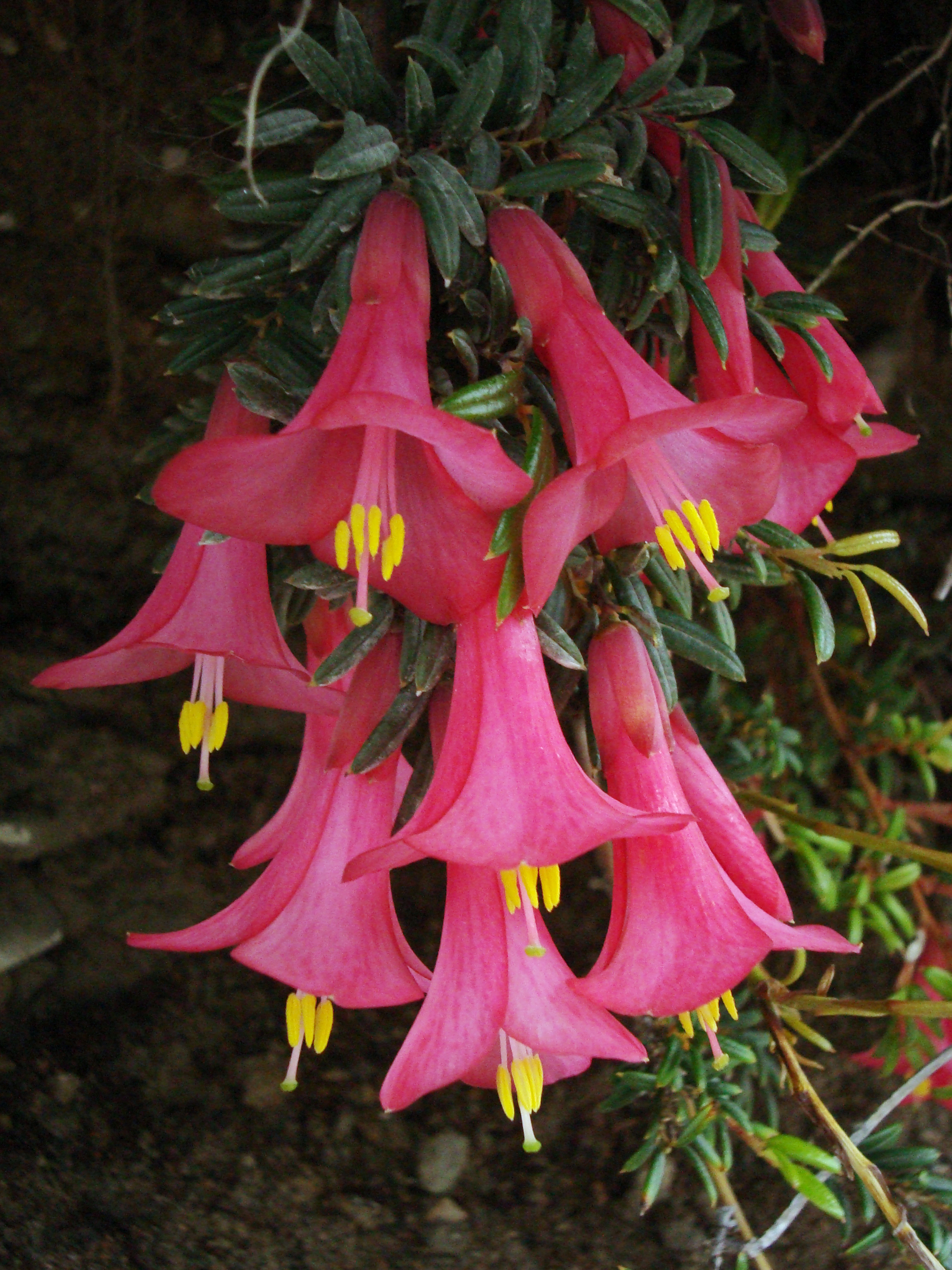
Philesia magellanica

==== Philesiaceae ====
The Philesiaceae (Chilean-bellflower family) are a family consisting of two monotypic genera, the two species being Philesia magellanica and the similar Lapageria rosea. They grow from a short woody rhizome, forming shrubs and vines respectively. They are found in the cool temperate forest of central and southern Chile, Magellan straits and adjacent Argentina, among the southern beech (Nothofagus) trees. Lapageria is the national flower of Chile and a popular ornamental with edible fruit. The name is thought to be related to the Greek word phileo (love), because of the attractiveness of its flowers.

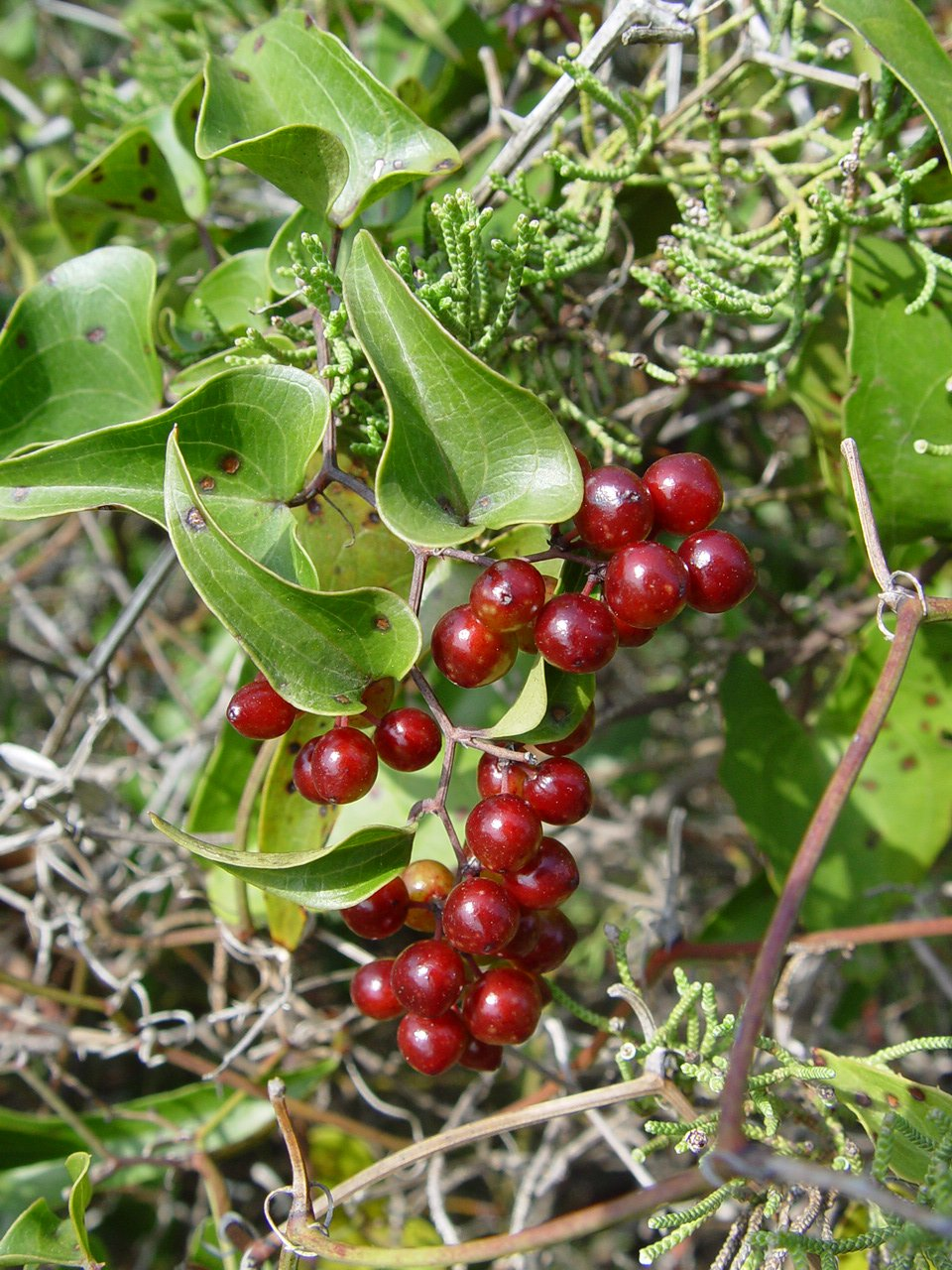
Smilax aspera

==== Smilacaceae ====
The Smilacaceae (Catbrier family) consist of a single large genus, Smilax, with about 210 species, making it the second largest family of the order, after Liliaceae. They are perennial vines, shrubs or herbaceous, sometimes woody, plants with short fibrous woody (sometimes tuberous) rhizomes. Smilacaceae are pantropical with extension into temperate zones north (N America, Mediterranean, Russian Far East) and south (Eastern Australia). A number of species have been used in traditional medicine and as foodstuffs. Smilax china was used to treat gout. S. aristolochiifolia was used to treat syphilis (but later as sarsaparilla to flavor root beer and confectionary). The fruit of S. megacarpa is consumed in conserves. The young shoots of many species are also edible. The family is named after the Greek myth of the affair between the mortal Krokos (or Crocus) and the nymph Smilax, whose punishment was to be turned into the prickly vine Smilax aspera.

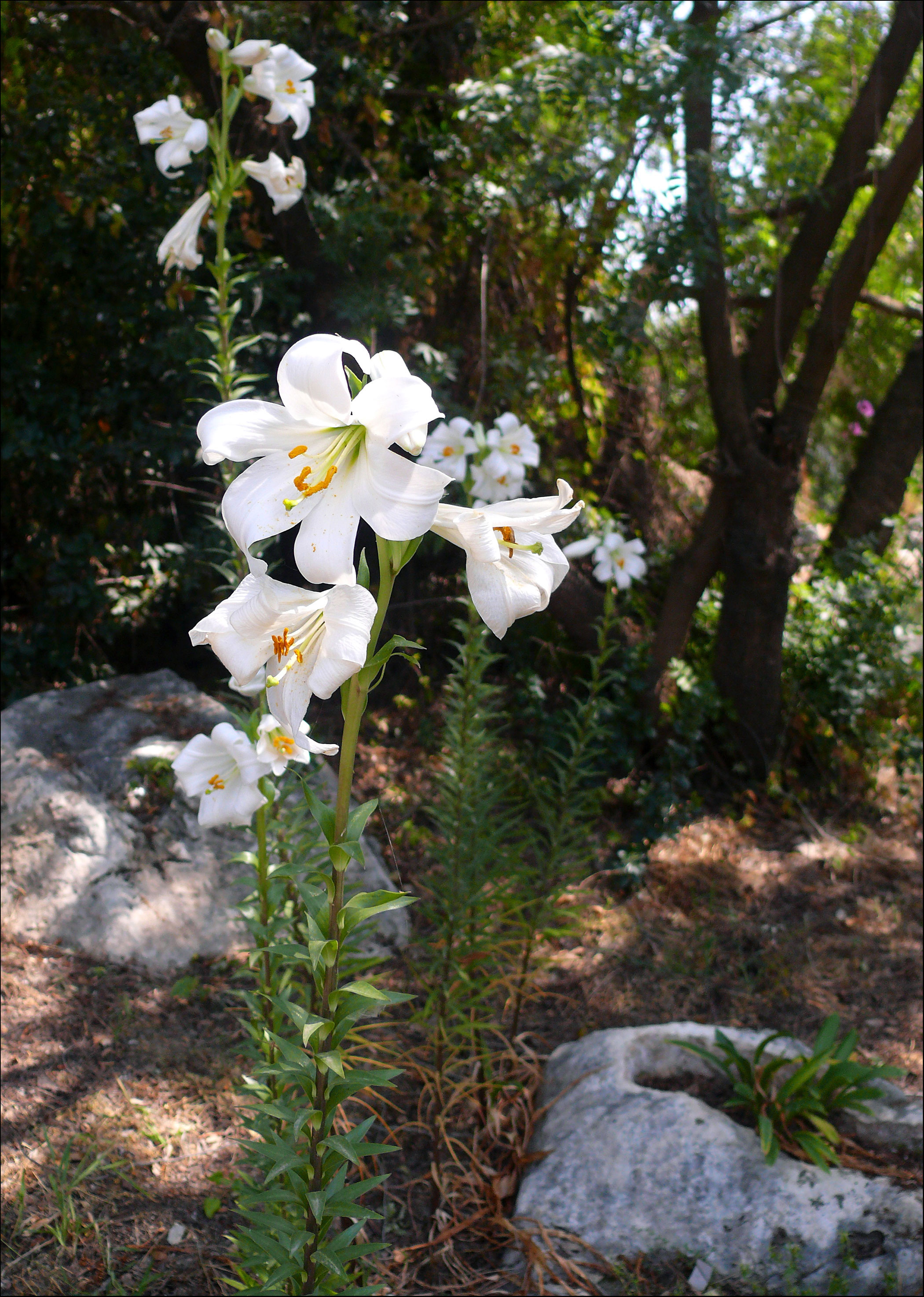
Lilium candidum

==== Liliaceae ====
The lily family, Liliaceae, are the largest Liliales family, with 15 genera and about 700 species, though much reduced from earlier circumscriptions, in four subfamilies. Of these genera, Gagea is the largest (204 spp.), but some are quite small, with Medeola being monotypic. They are perennial herbaceous plants, growing from bulbs or corms (rarely creeping rhizomes), with actinomorphic hypogynous flowers that are often coloured and patterned. They are predominantly northern temperate in distribution, with extension to subtropical areas of N Africa, India, China and Luzon, but are absent from the southern hemisphere. The bulbs have been used as foodstuffs or in traditional medicine. Cardiocrinum cordatum and Erythronium japonicum are sources of starch. Many Liliaceae are important in the floriculture and horticulture industries, particularly Tulipa and Lilium, but also Fritillaria. Many are also important ornamentals, such as Calochortus, Cardiocrinum, Clintonia, Erythronium and Tricyrtis. The name is derived from the Latin word for lily, lilium, which in turn is derived from the Greek leirion, a white lily.

== Distribution and habitat ==
Widely distributed but most commonly found in subtropical and temperate regions, especially herbaceous taxa in temperate regions of the Northern Hemisphere, and subtropical regions of the Southern hemisphere, including vines. Since many species are cultivated they have been introduced in many regions and consequently worldwide, and a number have subsequently escaped and naturalised.

== Uses ==
Liliales form important sources of food and pharmaceuticals as well as playing a significant role in horticulture and floriculture as ornamental plants. Pharmaceutical products include colchicine from Colchicum and Gloriosa (Colchicaceae) and veratrine and related compounds from Veratrum (Melanthiaceae) and Zigadenus (Melanthiaceae).

== Bibliography ==
=== Books and symposia ===
- Byng, James W. (2014). "Liliales". The Flowering Plants Handbook: A practical guide to families and genera of the world. Plant Gateway Ltd. pp. 61–69. ISBN 978-0-9929993-1-5.
- Christenhusz, Maarten J. M.; Fay, Michael F.; Chase, Mark W. (2017). "Lilkiales". Plants of the World: An Illustrated Encyclopedia of Vascular Plants. University of Chicago Press. pp. 141–150. ISBN 978-0-226-52292-0.
- Simpson, Michael G. (2011). Plant Systematics. Academic Press. ISBN 978-0-08-051404-8.
- Singh, Gurcharan (2010) [2004]. Plant Systematics: An Integrated Approach (3rd ed.). CRC. ISBN 978-1-57808-351-0.
- Singh, Gurcharan (2019) [2004]. Plant Systematics: An Integrated Approach (4th ed.). CRC Press. ISBN 978-1-00-057677-1.
- Stevenson, D. W.; Davis, J. I.; Freudenstein, J. V.; Hardy, C. R.; Simmons, M. P.; et al. (2000). "A phylogenetic analysis of the monocotyledons based on morphological and molecular character sets, with comments on the placement of Acorus and Hydatellaceae". In Wilson, K. L.; Morrison, D. A. (eds.). Monocots: Systematics and evolution. Collingwood, Australia: CSIRO Publ. pp. 17–24.
- Stuessy, Tod F. (2009). Plant taxonomy: the systematic evaluation of comparative data (2nd ed.). New York: Columbia University Press. ISBN 978-0-231-51864-2.
- Wilson, K. L.; Morrison, D. A., eds. (2000). Monocots: Systematics and evolution (Proceedings of the Second International Conference on the Comparative Biology of the Monocotyledons, Sydney, Australia 1998). Collingwood, Australia: CSIRO. ISBN 0-643-06437-0. Excerpts

Taxonomic systems

- Cronquist, A (1981). An integrated system of classification of flowering plants. New York: Columbia University Press. ISBN 0-231-03880-1.
- Dahlgren, R.M.; Clifford, H.T.; Yeo, P.F. (1985). The families of the monocotyledons. Berlin: Springer-Verlag. ISBN 978-3-642-64903-5. Additional excerpts
- Hutchinson, John (1973). The families of flowering plants, arranged according to a new system based on their probable phylogeny. 2 vols (3rd ed.). Oxford University Press.
- Kubitzki, Klaus; Huber, Herbert, eds. (1998). The families and genera of vascular plants. Vol. 3. Flowering plants. Monocotyledons: Lilianae (except Orchidaceae). Berlin, Germany: Springer-Verlag. ISBN 978-3-540-64060-8., (additional excerpts)
- Takhtajan, Armen Leonovich (1997). Diversity and Classification of Flowering Plants. Columbia University Press. ISBN 978-0-231-10098-4.

=== Historical sources ===
- Agardh, Carl Adolph (1825). "XI. Liliiflorae". Classes Plantarum (in Latin). Lund: Literis Berlingianis. p. 8.
- Bentham, G.; Hooker, J.D. (1883). "Coronariae". Genera plantarum ad exemplaria imprimis in herbariis kewensibus servata definita. vol. 3 (in Latin). London: L Reeve & Co. pp. ix–x.
- Eichler, August W. (1886) [1876]. Syllabus der Vorlesungen über specielle und medicinisch-pharmaceutische Botanik (4th ed.). Berlin: Borntraeger.
- Endlicher, Stephanus (1836). "Coronariae". Genera plantarum secundum ordines naturales disposita (in Latin). Vindobonae: Apud Fr.Beck. pp. 129–157.
- Engler, Adolf (1903) [1892]. "Liliiflorae". Syllabus der Pflanzenfamilien: eine Übersicht über das gesamte Pflanzensystem mit Berücksichtigung der Medicinal- und Nutzpflanzen nebst einer Übersicht über die Florenreiche und Florengebiete der Erde zum Gebrauch bei Vorlesungen und Studien über specielle und medicinisch-pharmaceutische Botanik (3rd ed.). Berlin: Gebrüder Borntraeger Verlag. pp. 93–101., see also Syllabus der Pflanzenfamilien
- Lindley, John (1853) [1846]. "Liliales". The Vegetable Kingdom: or, The structure, classification, and uses of plants, illustrated upon the natural system (3rd. ed.). London: Bradbury & Evans. pp. 195–206.
- Lotsy, J. P. (1911). "Liliifloren". Vorträge über botanische stammesgeschichte, gehalten an der Reichsuniversität zu Leiden. Ein lehrbuch der pflanzensystematick. III Cormophyta Siphonogamia. Jena: G. Fischer. pp. 715–766.
- Perleb, Karl Julius (1826). Lehrbuch der Naturgeschichte des Pflanzenreichs. Freiburg im Breisgau: Friedrich Wagner. p. 129.
- Wettstein, Richard (1924). "Liliiflorae". Handbuch der Systematischen Botanik 2 vols (3rd ed.). p. 862. Archived from the original on 18 February 2015.

=== Chapters ===
- Anderson, Cajsa Lisa; Janssen, Thomas (2009). "Monocots". In Hedges, S. Blair; Kumar, Sudhir (eds.). The Timetree of Life. Oxford: Oxford University Press. pp. 203–212. ISBN 978-0-19-156015-6.
- Chase, Mark W.; Soltis, Douglas E.; Soltis, Pamela; Rudall, Paula J.; Fay, Michael F.; et al. (2000). "Higher-level systematics of the monocotyledons: an assessment of current knowledge and a new classification". pp. 3–16., In Wilson & Morrison (2000)
- Rudall, P. J.; Stobart, K. L.; Hong, W-P.; Conran, J. G.; Furness, C. A.; et al. (2000). "Consider the lilies: systematics of Liliales". Csiro. pp. 347–359. ISBN 978-0-643-09929-6., In Wilson & Morrison (2000)
- Davis, Jerrold I.; Mcneal, Joel R.; Barrett, Craig F.; Chase, Mark W.; Cohen, James I.; et al. (2013), "Contrasting patterns of support among plastid genes and genomes for major clades of the monocotyledons", in Wilkin, Paul; Mayo, Simon J (eds.), Early Events in Monocot Evolution, pp. 315–349, doi:10.1017/CBO9781139002950.015, ISBN 978-1-139-00295-0
- Kubitzki, K.; Rudall, P. J.; Chase, M. W. (1998). "Systematics and Evolution". pp. 23–33., in Kubitzki & Huber (1998)

=== Articles ===
- Fay, Michael F.; Chase, Mark W.; Rønsted, Nina; Davis, Jerrold I.; et al. (December 2005). "Phylogenetics of Liliales: summarized evidence from combined analyses of five plastid and one mitochondrial loci". Aliso. 22: 559–565.
- Givnish, Thomas J.; Zuluaga, Alejandro; Marques, Isabel; Lam, Vivienne K. Y.; Gomez, Marybel Soto; et al. (December 2016). "Phylogenomics and historical biogeography of the monocot order Liliales: out of Australia and through Antarctica". Cladistics. 32 (6): 581–605. doi:10.1111/cla.12153. PMID 34727673. S2CID 44059188.
- Hertweck, Kate L.; Kinney, Michael S.; Stuart, Stephanie A.; Maurin, Olivier; Mathews, Sarah; et al. (July 2015). "Phylogenetics, divergence times and diversification from three genomic partitions in monocots". Botanical Journal of the Linnean Society. 178 (3): 375–393. doi:10.1111/boj.12260.
- Janssen, Thomas; Bremer, Kare (December 2004). "The age of major monocot groups inferred from 800+ rbcL sequences". Botanical Journal of the Linnean Society. 146 (4): 385–398. doi:10.1111/j.1095-8339.2004.00345.x.
- Leitch, I. J.; Soltis, D. E.; Soltis, P. S.; Bennett, M. D. (1 January 2005). "Evolution of DNA Amounts Across Land Plants (Embryophyta)". Annals of Botany. 95 (1): 207–217. doi:10.1093/aob/mci014. PMC 4246719. PMID 15596468.
- Lima, Flaviana J. De; Saraiva, Antônio A.F.; Silva, Maria A.P. Da; Bantim, Renan A.M.; Sayão, Juliana M. (December 2014). "A new angiosperm from the Crato Formation (Araripe Basin, Brazil) and comments on the Early Cretaceous Monocotyledons". Anais da Academia Brasileira de Ciências. 86 (4): 1657–1672. doi:10.1590/0001-3765201420140339. PMID 25590706.
- Petersen, Gitte; Seberg, Ole; Davis, Jerrold I. (June 2013). "Phylogeny of the Liliales (Monocotyledons) with special emphasis on data partition congruence and RNA editing". Cladistics. 29 (3): 274–295. doi:10.1111/j.1096-0031.2012.00427.x. PMID 34818830. S2CID 85302313.
- Qi, Zhechen; Cameron, Kenneth M.; Li, Pan; Zhao, Yunpeng; Chen, Shichao; et al. (December 2013). "Phylogenetics, character evolution, and distribution patterns of the greenbriers, Smilacaceae (Liliales), a near-cosmopolitan family of monocots". Botanical Journal of the Linnean Society. 173 (4): 535–548. doi:10.1111/boj.12096.
- Soltis, Douglas E.; Soltis, Pamela S.; Bennett, Michael D.; Leitch, Ilia J. (November 2003). "Evolution of genome size in the angiosperms". American Journal of Botany. 90 (11): 1596–1603. doi:10.3732/ajb.90.11.1596. PMID 21653334.
- Thorne, Robert F.; Reveal, James L. (April 2007). "An Updated Classification of the Class Magnoliopsida ("Angiospermae")". The Botanical Review. 73 (2): 67–181. doi:10.1663/0006-8101(2007)73[67:AUCOTC]2.0.CO;2. S2CID 24415895.
- Traub, Hamilton P; Kress, WJ (2016). "Liliales". Encyclopædia Britannica.
- Vinnersten, A.; Bremer, K. (2001). "Age and biogeography of major clades in Liliales". American Journal of Botany. 88 (9): 1695–1703. doi:10.2307/3558415. JSTOR 3558415. PMID 21669704.

APG

- Angiosperm Phylogeny Group (1998), "An ordinal classification for the families of flowering plants", Annals of the Missouri Botanical Garden, 85 (4): 531–553, doi:10.2307/2992015, JSTOR 2992015
- Angiosperm Phylogeny Group II (2003), "An update of the Angiosperm Phylogeny Group classification for the orders and families of flowering plants: APG II", Botanical Journal of the Linnean Society, 141 (4), Bremer, B., K. Bremer, M.W. Chase, J.L. Reveal, D.E. Soltis, P.S. Soltis & P.F. Stevens: 399–436, doi:10.1046/j.1095-8339.2003.t01-1-00158.x
- Angiosperm Phylogeny Group III (2009), "An update of the Angiosperm Phylogeny Group classification for the orders and families of flowering plants: APG III", Botanical Journal of the Linnean Society, 161 (2), Bremer, B., K. Bremer, M.W. Chase, M.F. Fay, J.L. Reveal, D.E. Soltis, P.S. Soltis & P.F. Stevens: 105–121, doi:10.1111/j.1095-8339.2009.00996.x, hdl:10654/18083
- Angiosperm Phylogeny Group IV (2016). "An update of the Angiosperm Phylogeny Group classification for the orders and families of flowering plants: APG IV". Botanical Journal of the Linnean Society. 181 (1): 1–20. doi:10.1111/boj.12385.
- Chase, Mark W; Reveal, James L (2009), "A phylogenetic classification of the land plants to accompany APG III" (PDF), Botanical Journal of the Linnean Society, 161 (2): 122–127, doi:10.1111/j.1095-8339.2009.01002.x

=== Websites ===
- Reveal, James L (5 Nov 1997). "Takhtajan System of Classification" (pbio 250 Lecture Notes). Plant Systematics. University of Maryland: Norton-Brown Herbarium.
- Reveal, James L (9 April 2012). "Indices Nominum Supragenericorum Plantarum Vascularium: Alphabetical Listing by Genera of Validly Published Suprageneric Names". Plant Biology.
- Stevens, P.F. (2019) [2001]. "Liliales". AP Web v. 14. Missouri Botanical Garden. (see also Angiosperm Phylogeny Website)
- Stevens, P.F. (2019a) [2001]. "Main tree". AP Web v. 14. Missouri Botanical Garden. Archived from the original on 21 May 2015. (see also Angiosperm Phylogeny Website)
- WFO (2019). "Liliales Perleb". World Flora Online.
