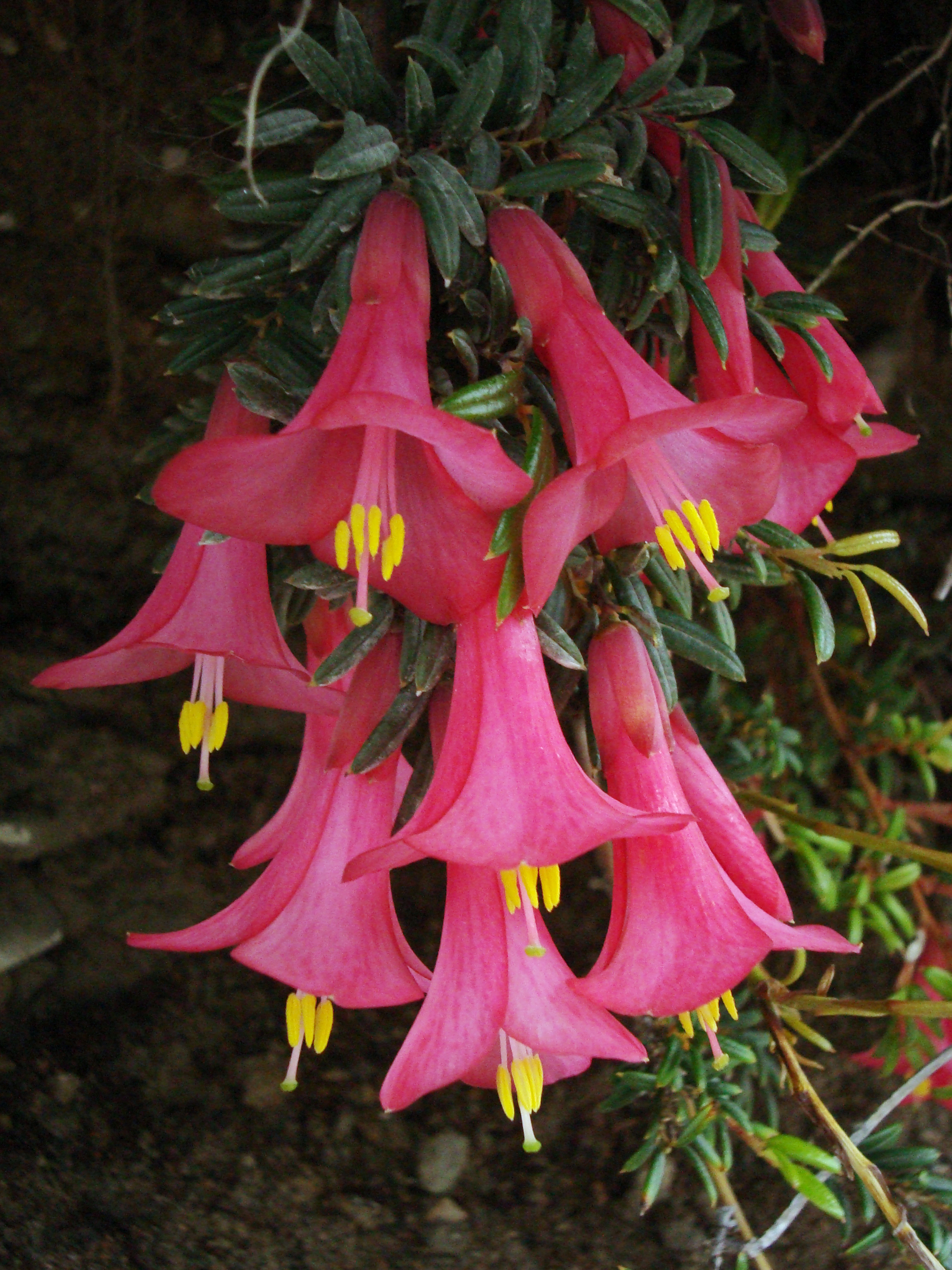

Scientific classification
- Kingdom: Plantae
- Clade: Tracheophytes
- Clade: Angiosperms
- Clade: Monocots
- Order: Liliales
- Family: Philesiaceae
- Genus: Philesia; Comm. ex Juss., 1789
- Species: P. magellanica

Binomial name
- Philesia magellanica J.F.Gmel., 1791

Synonyms
- Philesia buxifolia Lam. ex Poir.

= Philesia =

Genus of flowering plants

Philesia is a South American genus of flowering plants in the monocot family Philesiaceae first described as a genus in 1789. The native name is Coicopihue.

There is only one known species in this genus, Philesia magellanica, which is native to southern Chile (from Los Ríos to Magallanes regions) and southern Argentina. This species is, unusually for a monocot, a suckering shrub, growing to 1.2 metres (3 ft 11 in) tall and spreading by stolons. The leaves are linear, 15–35 mm long and 3–8 mm broad, glossy green above, and with two white stomatal bands below. The flowers have six tepals, the outer three short, 15–22 mm long, the inner three long, 45–65 mm long; they are mostly pink, but some darker, more purple variations have been recorded.
