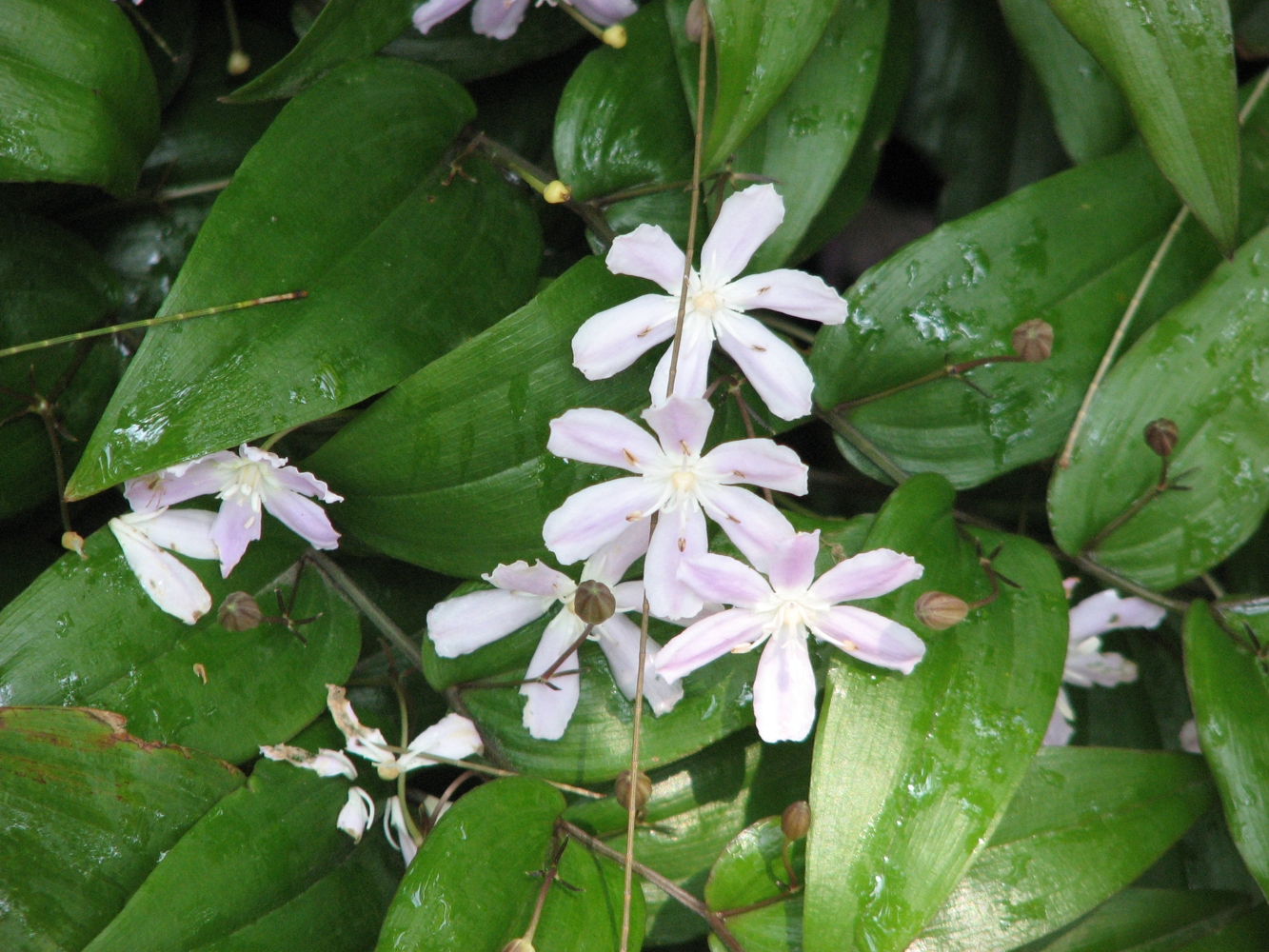

Scientific classification
- Kingdom: Plantae
- Clade: Embryophytes
- Clade: Tracheophytes
- Clade: Spermatophytes
- Clade: Angiosperms
- Clade: Monocots
- Order: Liliales
- Family: Colchicaceae
- Genus: Tripladenia; D.Don
- Species: T. cunninghamii

Binomial name
- Tripladenia cunninghamii D.Don

Synonyms
- Kreysigia Rchb. Kreysigia cunninghamii (D.Don) F.Muell.

= Tripladenia =

Genus of flowering plants

Tripladenia is a monotypic genus of plants in the family Colchicaceae. The sole species is Tripladenia cunninghamii which is native to New South Wales and Queensland in Australia.
