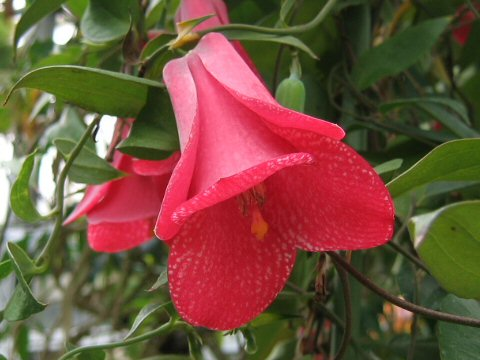
- Lapageria rosea

Scientific classification
- Kingdom: Plantae
- Clade: Tracheophytes
- Clade: Angiosperms
- Clade: Monocots
- Order: Liliales
- Family: Philesiaceae; Dumort.

Genera
- See text
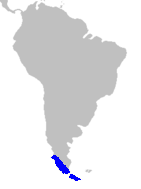
- Philesiaceae distribution

= Philesiaceae =

Family of flowering plants

Philesiaceae is a family of flowering plants, including two genera, each with a single species. The members of the family are woody shrubs or vines endemic to southern Chile.

The APG III system, of 2009 (unchanged from the APG II system of 2003 and the APG system, of 1998) places the family in the order Liliales, in the clade monocots. They are a sister to the family Ripogonaceae which is endemic to Australia, New Zealand and New Guinea.

== Genera ==
- Lapageria Ruiz & Pavon
- Philesia Comm. ex Jussieu
