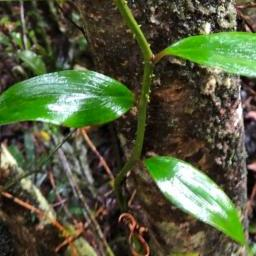
- Petermannia cirrosa

Scientific classification
- Kingdom: Plantae
- Clade: Embryophytes
- Clade: Tracheophytes
- Clade: Spermatophytes
- Clade: Angiosperms
- Clade: Monocots
- Order: Liliales
- Family: Petermanniaceae; Hutch.
- Genus: Petermannia; F.Muell.
- Species: P. cirrosa

Binomial name
- Petermannia cirrosa F.Muell.

= Petermannia =

Genus of flowering plants

Petermannia is the sole genus of plants in the family Petermanniaceae. Petermannia cirrosa, the only species in the genus, is endemic to the states of New South Wales and Queensland in Australia. it is a prickly, wiry stemmed vine which grows to 6 metres in height and has lancelote, ovate or elliptic leaves with an acute apex. The flowers, which appear during summer, have reflexed reddish green or white tepals. These are followed by rounded red berries.

== Bibliography ==
- Christenhusz, Maarten J. M.; Fay, Michael F.; Chase, Mark W. (2017). "Saxifragales". Plants of the World: An Illustrated Encyclopedia of Vascular Plants. University of Chicago Press. pp. 231–244. ISBN 978-0-226-52292-0.
- "Petermannia cirrosa". Atlas of Living Australia. CSIRO.
