= Karl Julius Perleb =

19th century German botanist

Karl Julius Perleb (20 June 1794, Konstanz – 8 June 1845, Freiburg im Breisgau) (also known as Carl Julius Perleb) was a German botanist and naturalist.

== Life ==
From 1809 to 1811, Karl Julius Perleb studied at the University of Freiburg and earned a doctorate in philosophy and in 1815 a degree in medicine. He lived in Vienna for a brief period of time. In 1818 he returned to the University of Freiburg and began a post-doctoral fellowship. He remained at the university for the remainder of his life. He became an associate professor of natural history in 1821, and in 1823 he became a full professor. From 1828 to 1845 he served as director of the Freiburg Botanical Garden. In 1838 he was appointed prorector at Freiburg University. He left his library and herbarium to the university, together with money for its administration and for travel grants for young scholars of the natural sciences.

== Work ==
Perleb was an author of numerous scientific publications and was a friend of Freiburg historian Heinrich Schreiber. He worked on the natural method of the classification of plants. In 1818 he translated de Candolle's Essai sur les propriétés médicales des plantes comparées avec leur classification naturelle into German as Versuch über die Arzneikräfte der Pflanzen, verglichen mit den äußeren Formen und der natürlichen Classeneintheilung derselben, with additions and comments. This was followed in 1826 by his Lehrbuch der Naturgeschichte des Pflanzenreichs in which he developed his own classification, based on that of de Candolle, but further developing the idea of a hierarchy in which orders were introduced as a rank between families and classes. He divided de Candolle's Calyciflorae into those with either fused of free petals and increased his number of subclasses by one. He then developed a key to the diagnostic ranks, updated from the Lehrbuch, his Clavis classium, ordinum et familiarum atque index generum regni vegetabilis (1838), following the method of Ray. In his system, there were 9 classes, 48 orders and 330 families. A second part of the Lehrbuch der Naturgeschichte, the Lehrbuch der Zoologie was published in 1831. He also published an account of the botanical garden at Freiburg, De horto botanico Friburgensi (1829)

=== List of selected publications ===
Sources

- Versuch über die Arzneikräfte der Pflanzen, verglichen mit den äußeren Formen und der natürlichen Classeneintheilung derselben (1818)
- Conspectus methodi plantarum naturalis in usum auditorum typis exscribi curavit (1822)
- Perleb, Karl Julius (1826). Lehrbuch der Naturgeschichte des Pflanzenreichs. Freiburg im Breisgau: Friedrich Wagner. p. 129.
- De Horto Botanico Friburgensi (1829)
- Lehrbuch der Naturgeschichte: Lehrbuch der Zoologie, (1831–1835)
- — (1838). Clavis, classium, ordinum et familiarum atque index generum regni vegetabilis. Diagnostische Uebersichtstafeln des natürlichen Pflanzensystems: nebst vollständigem Gattungsregister. Freiburg: A. Emmerling.

== Legacy ==
The botanical genus Perlebia (synonym Bauhinia) is named in his honor.

== See also ==
University of Freiburg Faculty of Biology

== Bibliography ==
- Stafleu, Frans A.; Cowan, Richard S. (1976). "Perleb, Karl [Carl] Julius". Taxonomic literature: a selective guide to botanical publications and collections with dates, commentaries and types. Vol. 4. P-Sak (2nd ed.). Utrecht: Bohn, Scheltema & Holkema. pp. 168–169. ISBN 9789031302246.
- Bibliography of Karl Julius Perleb, Bayerische StaatsBibliothek
