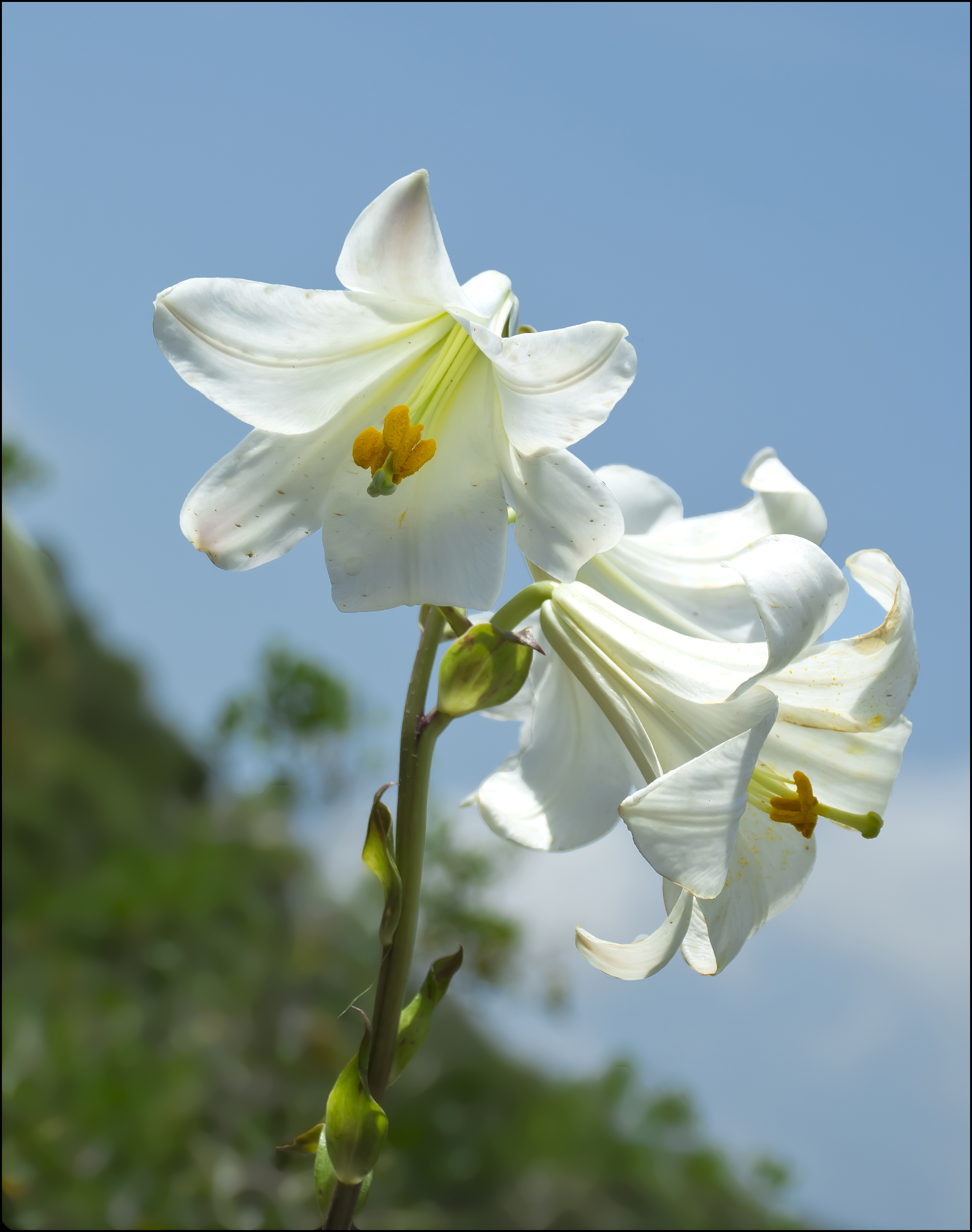
- Lilium candidum

Scientific classification
- Kingdom: Plantae
- Clade: Tracheophytes
- Clade: Angiosperms
- Clade: Monocots
- Grade: Lilioid monocots

Orders
- Petrosaviales Takht. (1997); Dioscoreales R.Br. (1835); Pandanales R.Br. ex Bercht. & J.Presl (1820); Liliales Perleb (1826); Asparagales Link 1829

= Lilioid monocots =

Grade of flowering plant orders, within Lilianae

Lilioid monocots (lilioids, liliid monocots, petaloid monocots, petaloid lilioid monocots) is an informal name used for a grade (grouping of taxa with common characteristics) of five monocot orders (Petrosaviales, Dioscoreales, Pandanales, Liliales and Asparagales) in which the majority of species have flowers with relatively large, coloured tepals. This characteristic is similar to that found in lilies ("lily-like"). Petaloid monocots refers to the flowers having tepals which all resemble petals (petaloid). The taxonomic terms Lilianae or Liliiflorae have also been applied to this assemblage at various times. From the early nineteenth century many of the species in this group of plants were put into a very broadly defined family, Liliaceae sensu lato or s.l. (lily family). These classification systems are still found in many books and other sources. Within the monocots the Liliaceae s.l. were distinguished from the Glumaceae.

The development of molecular phylogenetics, cladistic theory and phylogenetic methods in the 1990s resulted in a dismemberment of the Liliaceae and its subsequent redistribution across three lilioid orders (Liliales, Asparagales and Dioscoreales). Subsequent work has shown that two other more recently recognized orders, Petrosaviales and Pandanales also segregate with this group, resulting in the modern concept of five constituent orders within the lilioid monocot assemblage. This has resulted in treating monocots as three informal groups, alismatid, lilioid and commelinid monocots. The lilioids are paraphyletic in the sense that commelinids form a sister group to Asparagales.

== Description ==
=== True lilioids ===
The descriptive term "petaloid lilioid monocot" relates to the conspicuous petal-like (petaloid) tepals which superficially resemble true lilies (Lilium). Morphologically, the petaloid or lilioid monocots can be considered to possess five groups (pentacyclic) of three-fold (trimerous) whorls. Lilioid monocots all have flowers which can be considered to have been derived from a lily-like flower with six relatively similar tepals, and six stamens. The typical lilioid gynoecium has three carpels fused into a superior trilocular (three-chambered) superior ovary, axile placentation, a single hollow style, and several ovules with anatropous orientation in one or two rows per locule and nectaries at the base.

However, floral synapomorphy (shared characteristics) is rare since most conform to the general monocot pattern. This pattern is ancestral (plesiomorphic) for the lilioid monocots. Structural monosymmetry is rare, except for Orchidaceae.

Various trends are apparent among the lilioids, notably a change to an inferior ovary and a reduction of the number of stamens to three. In some groups (such as the genus Trillium in the Liliaceae), the tepals have become clearly differentiated so that the flower has three coloured petals and three smaller green sepals. Almost all lilioid monocots retain at least three petal-like tepals. Since some commelinids (e.g., Palisota in the Commelinaceae, Haemodoraceae, Philydraceae, and Pontederiaceae) have petaloid flowers, the term 'lilioid' is a more accurate one for the group which excludes them, since the term petaloid monocot is still occasionally used in describing commelinids. The morphological concept of petaloid monocots has been equated with "animal-attracting" (that is, for pollination) as opposed to wind-pollinating plants (such as grasses) that have evolved very different floral structures. Pollen structure shows that of the two main tapetum types, secretory and plasmodial, the lilioid monocots are nearly all secretory.

Lilioid monocots: Botanical illustrations of type genera by order

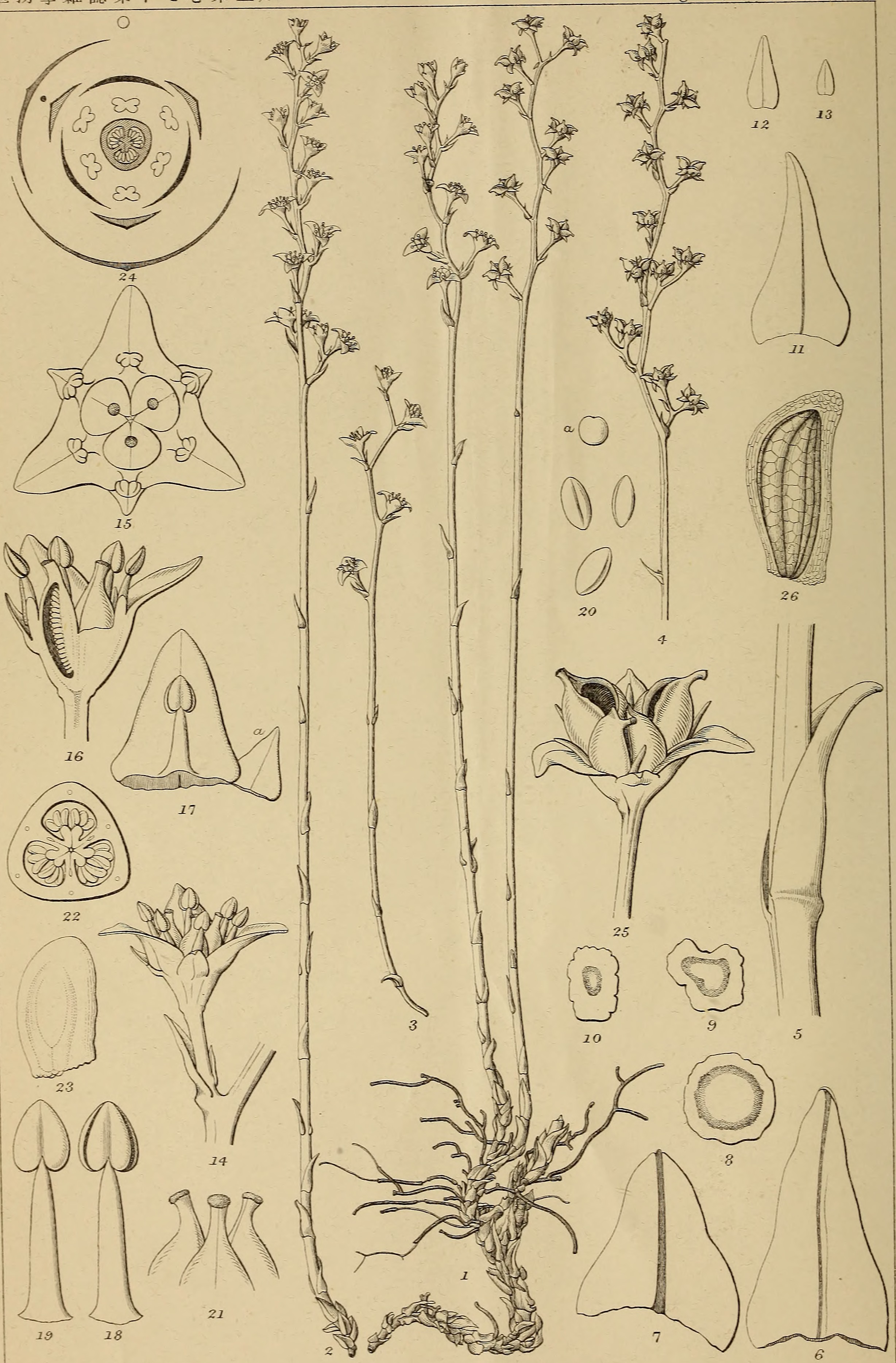
Petrosaviales:
Petrosavia sakuraii

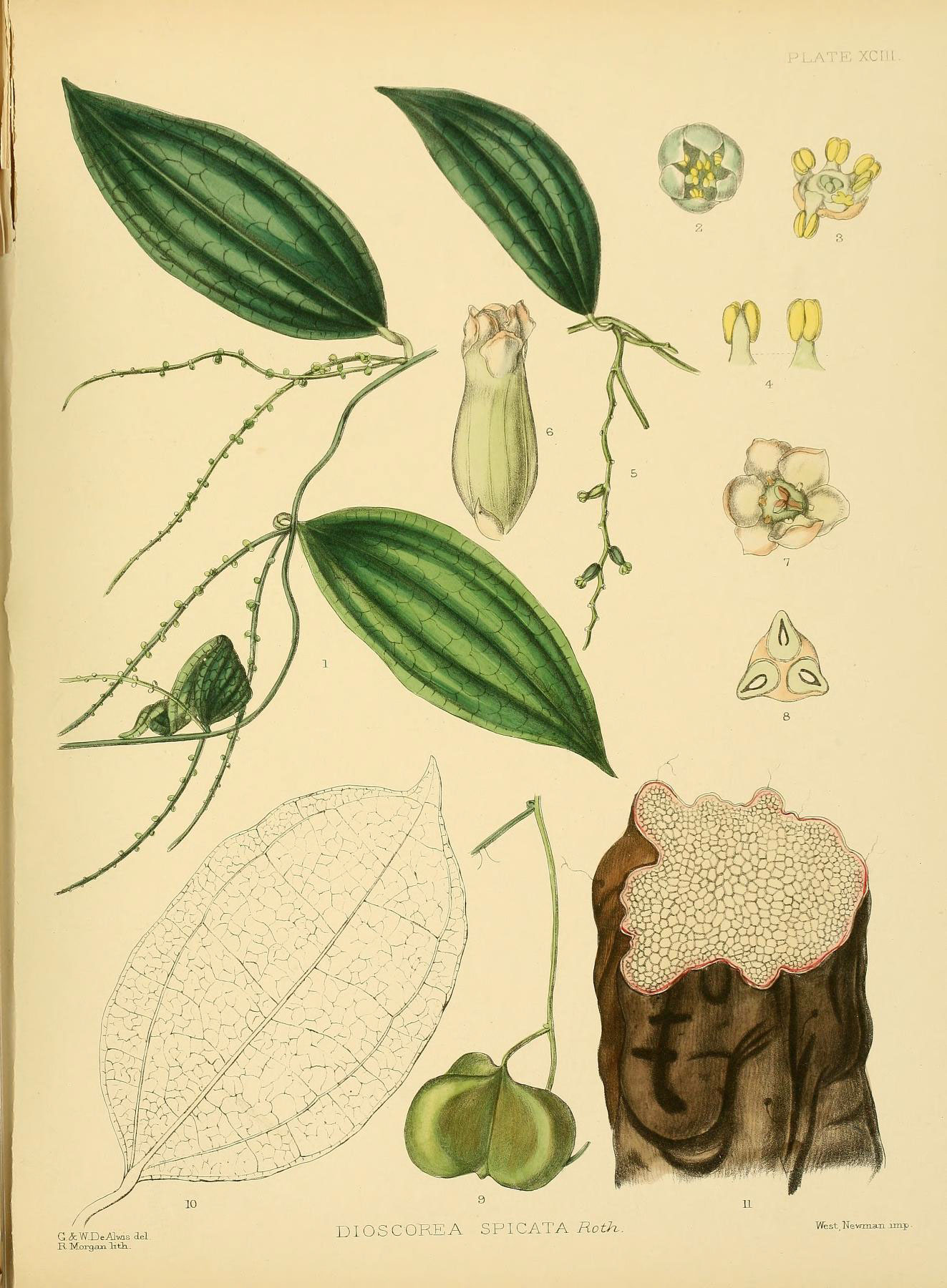
Dioscoreales:
Dioscorea spicata

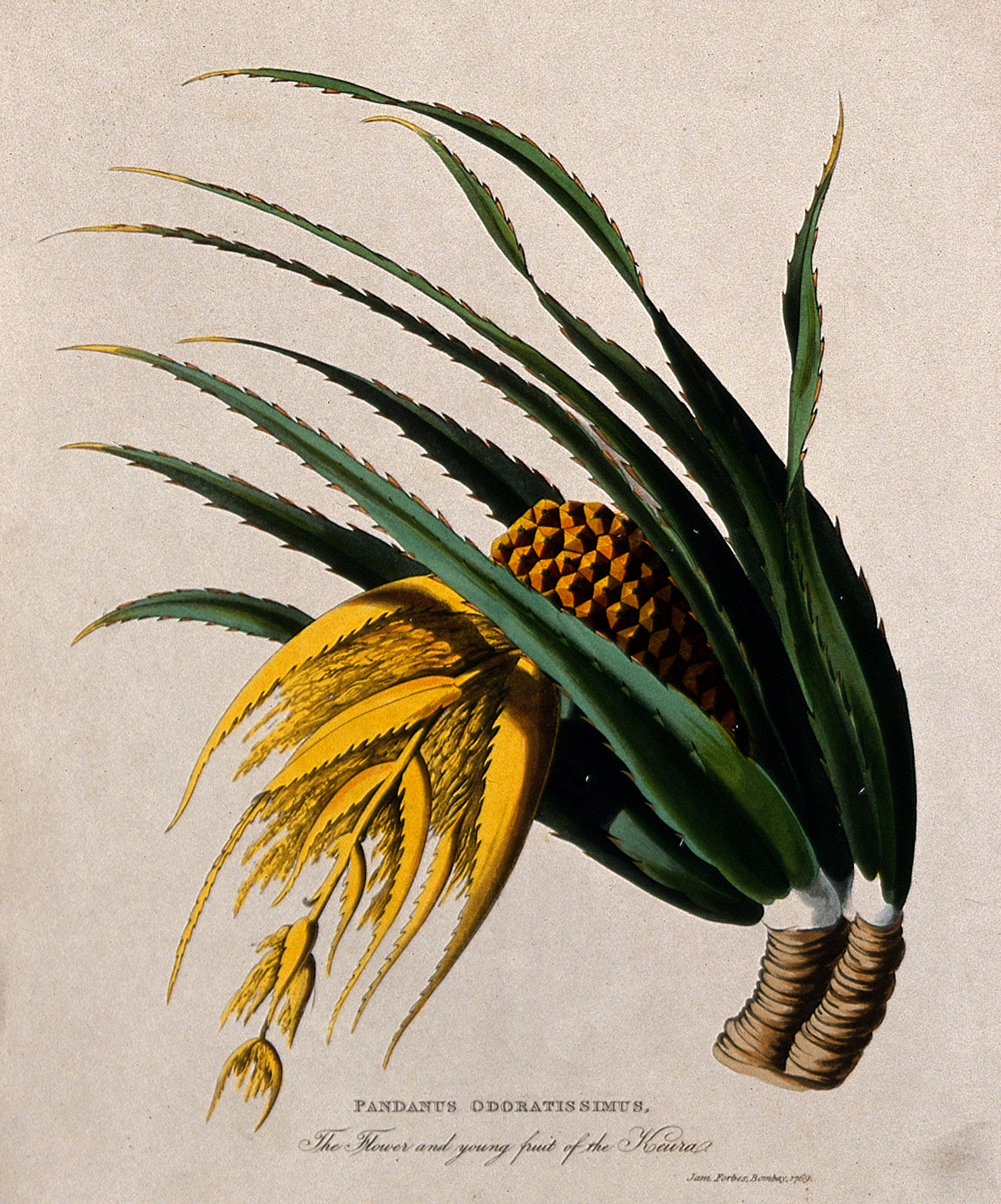
Pandanales:
Pandanus tectorius

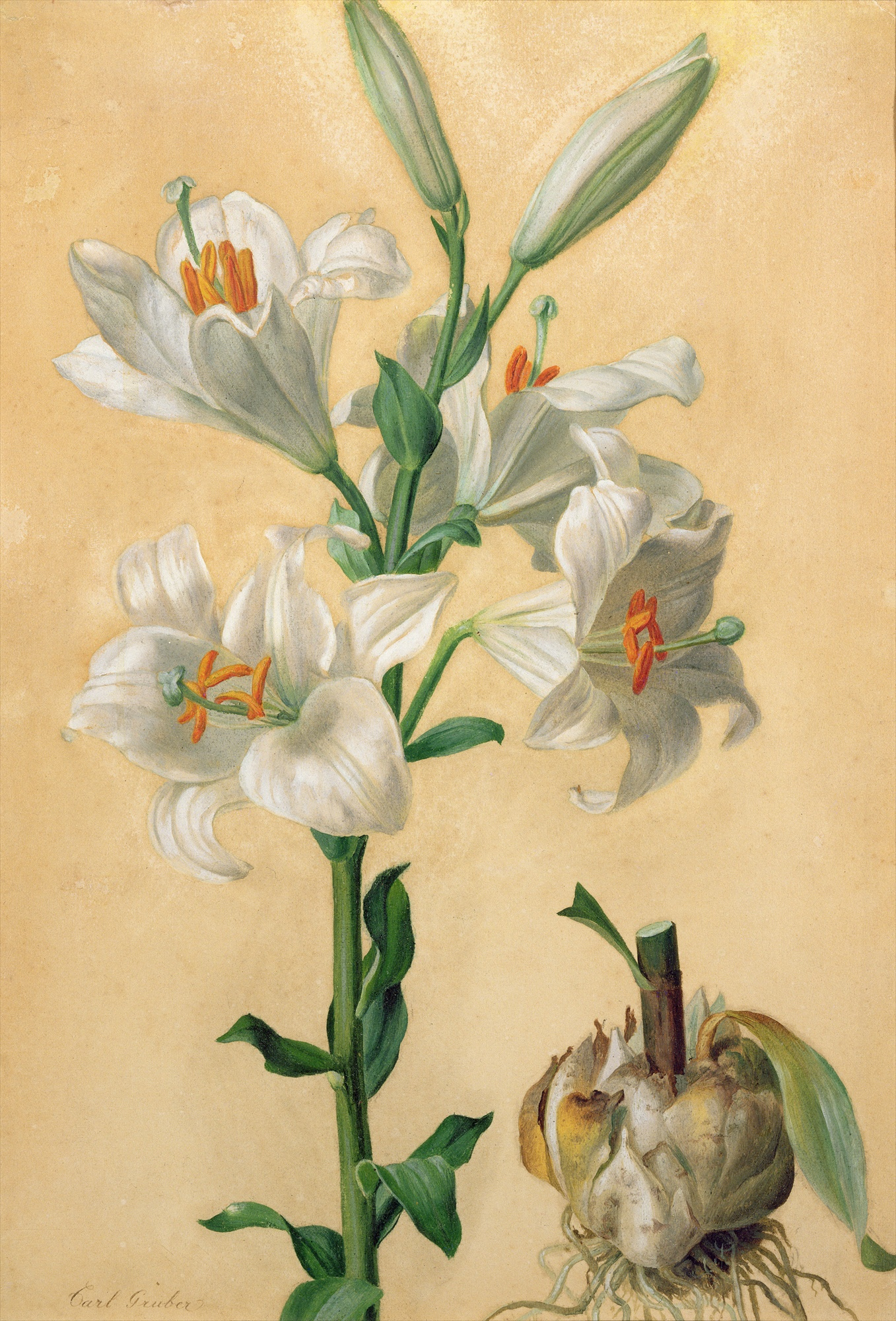
Liliales:
Lilium candidum

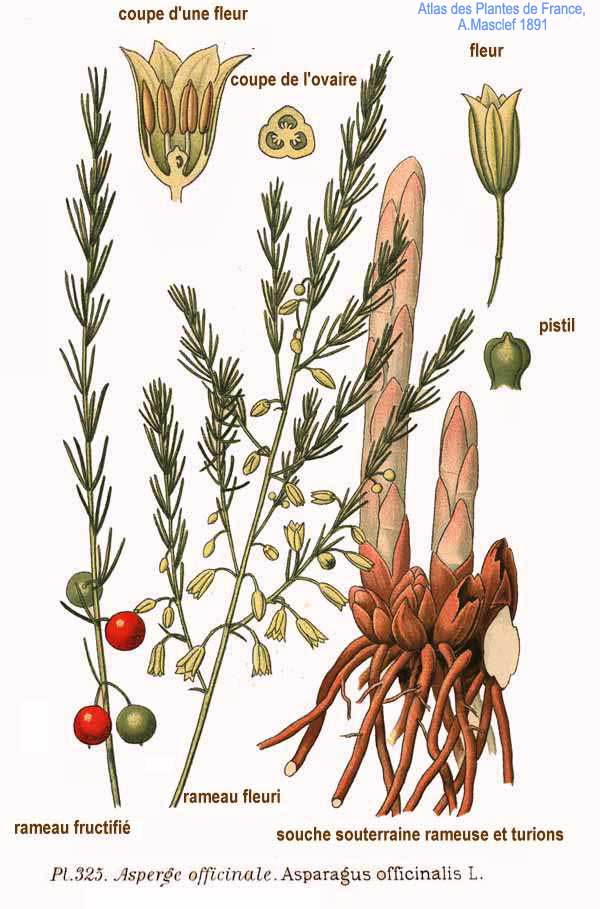
Asparagales:
Asparagus officinalis

=== Comparison with other monocot orders ===
In the orders that branched off before the lilioid monocots, the Acorales and Alismatales, flowers differ in several ways. In some cases, like Acorus (Acorales), they have become insignificant. In others, like Butomus (Alismatales), they have six coloured tepals, and so could be called 'petaloid', but stamens and carpels are more numerous than in the lilioid monocots.

The later evolved commelinids have various kinds of flower, few of which are 'lily-like'. In the order Poales, comprising grasses, rushes and sedges, flowers are either petal-less or have small, unshowy petals. Many Zingiberales species have brightly coloured and showy flowers. However, their apparent structure is misleading. For example, the six tepals of cannas are small and hidden under expanded and brightly coloured stamens or staminodes which resemble petals and may be mistaken for them.

== Taxonomy ==
=== Early history ===
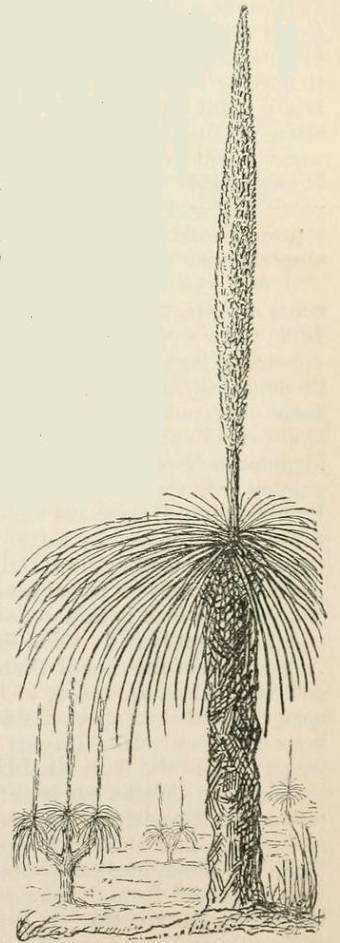
Xanthorrhaea hastilis, John Lindley: Vegetable Kingdom, 1846

In one of the earliest monocot taxonomies, that of John Lindley (1830), the grouping corresponding to the lilioid monocots was the "tribe" Petaloideae. In Lindley's system the monocots consisted of two tribes, the Petaloideae, and the Glumaceae (the grasses and sedges). Lindley divided the Petaloideae into 32 "orders" (roughly corresponding to families) and the Glumaceae into two further orders. Various successive taxonomies of the monocots also emphasized the grouping of species with petaloid (undifferentiated) perianths, such as Bentham and Hooker's Coronarieæ and Hutchinson's Corolliferae ("Corolla bearing") (1936). Hence the concept that there was a natural grouping of monocots whose flowers were predominantly petaloid, gave notion to the term "petaloid monocots". The core group of petaloids were the Liliaceae, hence "lilioid monocots".

The term "lilioid monocot" or lilioid" has had widely varying interpretations. One of the narrower applications is "lily-like" monocots, meaning the two orders Asparagales and Liliales, but the term has also been applied to Takhtajan's superorder Lilianae, the whole of Liliales, or restricted to Cronquist's broadly defined Liliaceae. Although "petaloid" and "lilioid" have often been used interchangeably, as Heywood points out, some usages of "petaloid monocot", particularly in horticulture, are so broad as to be almost meaningless in that it had been used to refer to all species with conspicuous petals or perianth segments (tepals), which would cover a broad swathe of families (he estimated three dozen across many orders). Other authors have defined it equally broadly as "having two whorls of tepals (sepals and petals) that are petal-like".

As Kron and Chase stated in 1995, this taxonomic unit had been in a considerable state of flux, with significant variation between the systems of Cronquist (1981), Thorne (1983, 1992), and Dahlgren (1985). When classification systems were based on morphological characters alone, lilioid species which clearly departed from the "lily" pattern were easily placed into separate families. For example, the Amaryllidaceae contained species whose flowers had six stamens and an inferior ovary. The Iridaceae contained those with three stamens and an inferior ovary. The remaining taxa were put together in a very broadly defined Liliaceae, usually referred to as Liliaceae sensu lato (s.l.). The Cronquist system's definition, for example, is the broadest of all. Rolf Dahlgren and colleagues were responsible for one of the most radical reorganisation of families, and in their 1985 monocot monograph defined the two orders (Asparagales and Liliales) which contain the bulk of monocot geophytes, as constituting the lilioid monocots. (Note: Dahlgren did not actually use the exact term.)

The development of DNA sequencing and the use of genetic data in determining relationships between species of monocots confirmed what many taxonomists had long suspected: Liliaceae s.l. was highly polyphyletic. The family was demonstrated to include a significant number of unrelated groups, which belonged to quite separate families and even orders. For instance some genera such as Hyacinthus, previously placed in Liliaceae s.l., were reclassified in families within Asparagales (in this case Asparagaceae). In 1995 Chase et al. reviewed the understanding of the lilioids and equated them to Dahlgreen's Liliiflorae, which they designated as superorder Lilianae. They pointed out that the understanding of the phylogenetics of this group was critical for the establishment of a monocot classification. They also noted that while many authors treated this group as monophyletic (having a common ancestor), a closer reading of their texts revealed evidence of paraphyly (excluding some descendants of a common ancestor). For instance, Dahlgren had based monophyly on a single synapomorphy, that of a petaloid perianth, yet in discussing his Lilliflorae admitted it was undoubtedly paraphyletic. (Note: "This superorder is extraordinarily variable and contains some groups which, in our estimation, are likely to have retained many features from the ancestral monocotyledons. The wide range of variation makes a definition difficult and in an evolutionary sense this unit is undoubtedly paraphyletic rather than monophyletic "(emphasis added).) Dahlgren treated the monocots as split between ten superorders and placed five orders (Dioscoreales, Asparagales, Liliales, Melanthiales, Burmanniales and Orchidales) in his Liliiflorae.

=== Phylogenetic era ===
In the 1995 study by Chase et al. referred to above, which was the largest yet to use purely molecular data, the results demonstrated paraphyly of the lilioids. However, because their data contradicted purely morphological phylogenies they were reluctant to draw definite conclusions as to the monophyly of this group. They identified four major clades of monocots. They named these alismatids, aroids, stemonoids and dioscoreoids, in addition to Acorus, and a core group of Asparagales, Liliales and commelinoids. They based the names of these groups on the closest corresponding superorders and orders of Dahlgren, with the exception of stemonoids (based on Stemonaceae for which there was no obvious equivalent).

There was no clear clade corresponding to Dahlgren's Liliiflorae, whose families were distributed amongst the aroids and dioscoreoids. Of Dahlgren's Liliiflorae, the Dioscoreales largely grouped into dioscoreoids, with the exception of Stemonaceae. The Asparagales formed two major groupings, which they labelled "higher" and "lower asparagoids", and included both the Iridaceae and Orchidaceae from Dahlgren's Liliales. On the other hand, a number of families from three other orders (Asparagales, Dioscoreales, Melanthiales) segregated together with the remaining Liliales families. Genera from Dahlgren's Melanthiales were found in both dioscoreoids and the redefined Liliales. Finally Dahlgren's Burmanniales were found to belong with the dioscoreoids. Some Asparagales taxa were also found amongst the commelinoids. The stemonoids were formed from Stemonaceae and other families from a variety of orders, including Pandanaceae (which alone formed Dahlgren's Pandaniflorae).

In an attempt to resolve the apparent differences between morphological and molecularly defined trees, a combined analysis was undertaken (Note: Subsequent to the 1993 Monocot Conference, and prior to publication.) which confirmed superorder Liliiflorae as monophyletic, provided that a few modifications were undertaken. These included the removal of two tribes of Melanthiaceae (Melanthiales) and the inclusion of three additional families (Cyclanthaceae, Pandanaceae and Velloziaceae) from other superorders. This newly and more narrowly redefined Lilianae/Liliiflorae contained three orders, Asparagales, Liliales and Dioscoreales (which now included the stemonoids). This analysis also allowed for the establishment of a single synapomorphy, although this time by the presence of an inferior ovary. Significantly, the authors noted that it was no wonder the authors of angiosperm classifications had been exasperated by the Lilianae.

=== Angiosperm Phylogeny Group ===
These findings, presented at the first Monocot Conference in 1993, with the addition of several studies that had become available in the interim, formed the basis of the 1998 consensus Angiosperm Phylogeny Group (APG) ordinal scheme. Among other things, the Alismatales were expanded and new orders such as Acorales (a placement for Acorus) and Pandanales (which now represented the stemonoids as well as new families) added. While not formally assigning any supraordinal ranks, the classification did recognize an informal grouping of monocot orders as the commelinoids. Otherwise the APG recognized only six monocot orders (Acorales, Alismatales, Asparagales, Dioscoreales, Liliales and Pandanales). The last four were however grouped together in the resulting cladogram and most closely represent the concept of lilioids, although this left some unplaced monocot families, including Corsiaceae and Petrosaviaceae.

Simultaneous with the release of the 1998 APG classification were two events: the publication of Kubitzki's major monograph on the monocots and the Second Monocot Conference. Kubitzki defined superorder Lilianae as all monocots except superorders Commelinae, Alismatanae and the Acoraceae, that is the four orders Asparagales, Liliales, Dioscoreales and Pandanales. The Monocot Conference devoted an entire section to Systematics of the Lilioids and included an update of their previous research by Chase and colleagues. On this occasion the latter felt that there was now enough data to put forward a definitive classification, defining the Lilioids as comprising the four orders placed in Lilianae by Kubitzki. Rudall and colleagues (2002) followed Chase (2000), in using the term "lilioid monocots" and again noting unresolved polytomy between these four orders and the remaining monocot clades (commelinids and Petrosaviaceae), although at that time the Petrosaviaceae were still unplaced.

There was now enough new data to justify revising the APG system, and a new classification was issued in 2003. Although this resulted in changes within the orders, it did not affect the relationship between them. Lilioid monocots were discussed but not formally recognized (commelinids, renamed from commelinoids, being the only supraordinal grouping in the monocots to be named) and Petrosaviaceae remained unplaced. The second version of the APG coincided with the third Monocot Conference (2003), the findings from which, using additional molecular markers, helped to resolve some of the remaining questions regarding relationships within this assemblage. Petrosaviaceae was shown to be included in what Chase refers to as "liliids" and placed in order Petrosaviales, while Dioscoreales and Pandanales were demonstrated to be sister clades. Rapid advances in understanding monocot relationships necessitated the release of another revision of the APG classification (2009), which incorporated these advances. Further definition of the relationships between lineages using multiple markers is continuing.

Textbooks and other sources produced in the last century are inevitably based on older classifications. Publications using versions of the APG system are now appearing and the World Checklist of Selected Plant Families from the Royal Botanic Gardens, Kew now uses the APG III system, as does the Angiosperm Phylogeny Website and hence the classification of the lilioid monocots shown in the cladogram below. The Kew botanists treat the monocots as falling into three major groupings: alismatid monocots (Acorales, Alismatales), lilioid monocots (the five other non-commelinid monocots) and commelinid monocots. They also organize their monocot research into two teams I: Alismatids and Lilioids and II: Commelinids. A similar approach is taken by Judd in his Plant systematics.

=== Phylogeny and evolution ===
The cladogram shown below displays the orders of Lilianae sensu Chase & Reveal (monocots) based on molecular phylogenetic evidence. Lilioid monocot orders are bracketed, namely Petrosaviales, Dioscoreales, Pandanales, Liliales and Asparagales. These constitute a paraphyletic assemblage, that is groups with a common ancestor that do not include all direct descendants (in this case commelinids which are a sister group to Asparagales); to form a clade, all the groups joined by thick lines would need to be included. While Acorales and Alismatales have been collectively referred to as "alismatid monocots", the remaining clades (lilioid and commelinid monocots) have been referred to as the "core monocots". The relationship between the orders (with the exception of the two sister orders) is pectinate, that is diverging in succession from the line that leads to the commelinids. Numbers indicate crown group (most recent common ancestor of the sampled species of the clade of interest) divergence times in mya (million years ago).

- Lilianae sensu Chase & Reveal (monocots) 131
  - - - Acorales
      - - Alismatales
        - 122
          - Petrosaviales
          - - 120
              - Dioscoreales 115
              - Pandanales 91
            - - Liliales 121
              - 121
                - Asparagales 120
                - commelinids 118
                  - Dasypogonaceae
                  - Arecales
                  - Poales
                  - - Zingiberales
                    - Commelinales

While this is the most commonly understood relationship, Davis et al. (2013) using a combination of plastid genomes have suggested that if Asparagales is treated sensu stricto by excluding its largest and most atypical family, Orchidaceae then Aparagales sensu APG may not be monophyletic and that Orchidaceae and Liliales may be sister groups, and in turn are the sister of Asparagales. However, their data produced conflicting models. Zeng et al. (2014) using nuclear genes also found evidence for a sister relationship between Asparagales and Liliales. Although divergence time estimates within the lilioids have varied considerably, they were also able to obtain molecular clock estimates for the origin of the lilioids at approximately 125 mya (Cretaceous period). On the other hand, a large data set using a combined analysis of nuclear, mitochondrial and plastid genes together with nuclear phytochrome C was in agreement with the earlier APG relationships.

=== Subdivision ===
Five orders make up the lilioid monocots.

- Petrosaviales Takht. (1997)
- Dioscoreales R.Br. (1835)
- Pandanales R.Br. ex Bercht. & J.Presl (1820)
- Liliales Perleb (1826)
- Asparagales Link 1829

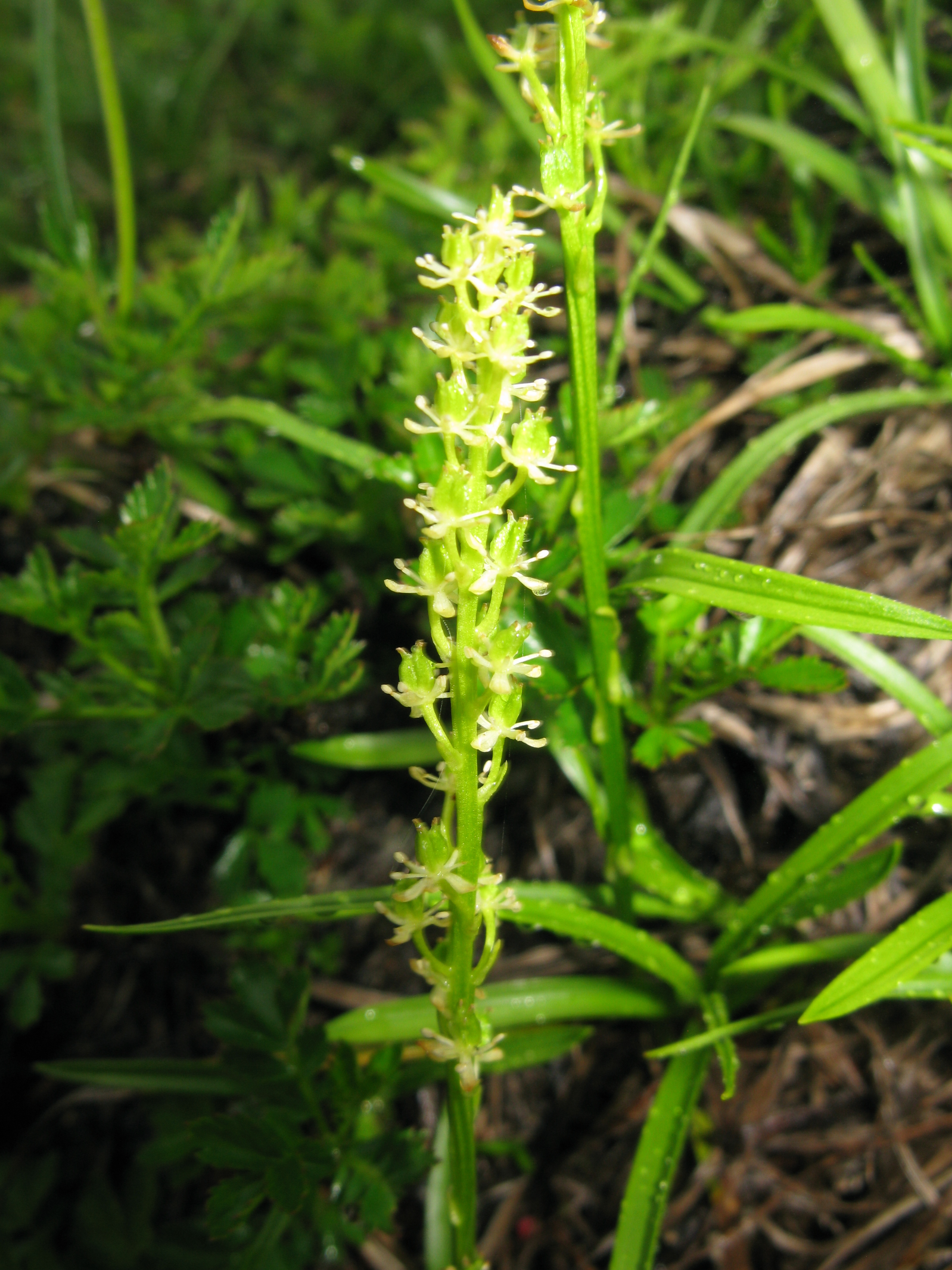
Japonolirion osense

==== Petrosaviales ====
Petrosaviales are a very small order (1 family, 2 genera, about 5 species) of rare leafless achlorophyllous, mycoheterotrophic plants found in dark montane rainforests in Japan, China, Southeast Asia and Borneo. They are characterized by having bracteate racemes, pedicellate flowers, six persistent tepals, septal nectaries, three almost distinct carpels, simultaneous microsporogenesis, monosulcate pollen, and follicular fruit.

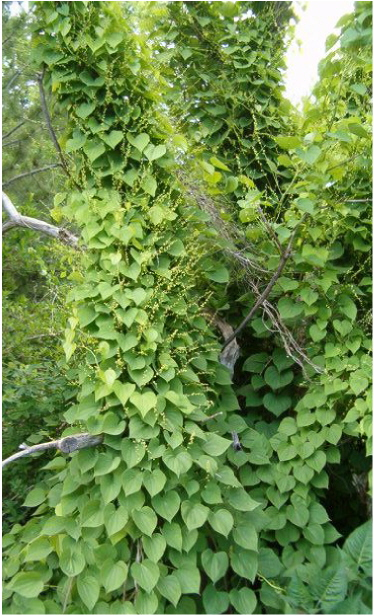
Dioscorea balcanica

==== Dioscoreales (yams) ====
Dioscoreales are a small order (3 families, 21 genera, about 1,000 species) of mainly tropical plants, characterized by vines and the ability to form underground tubers as food reserves, but also including forest floor herbaceous plants which may be saprophytic. The tuberous roots form a staple food in tropical areas and have been a source of extraction of steroids for oral contraceptives. They form a sister group to the Pandanales.

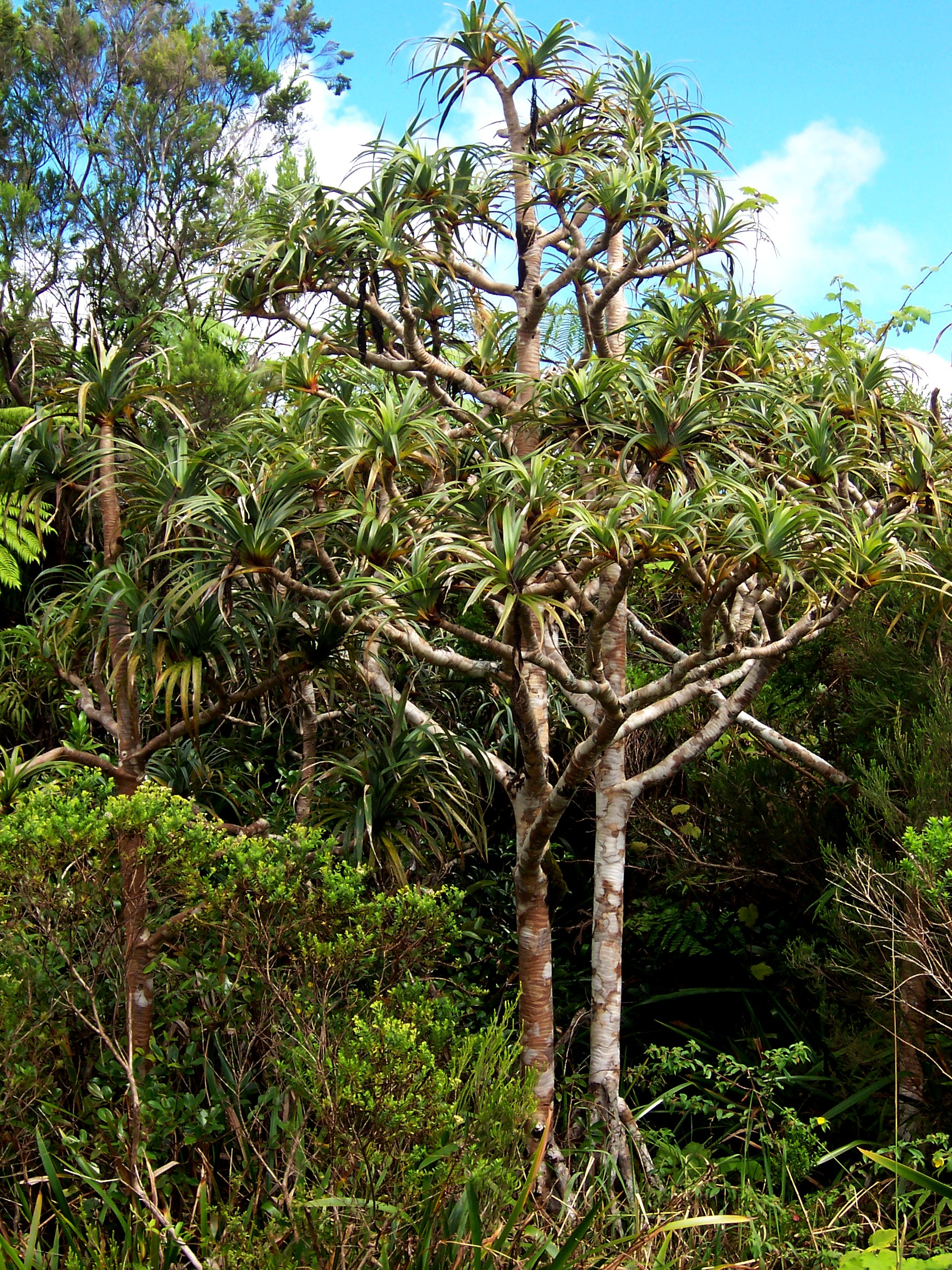
Pandanus montanus

==== Pandanales (pandans) ====
Pandanales are a medium size order (5 families, 36 genera, about 1,300 species) mainly tropical order many species of which produce strap-like leaves used in the manufacture of baskets, mats and straw hats. The order is very diverse including trees, vines and forest floor saprophytes. They are a sister group to the Dioscoreales.

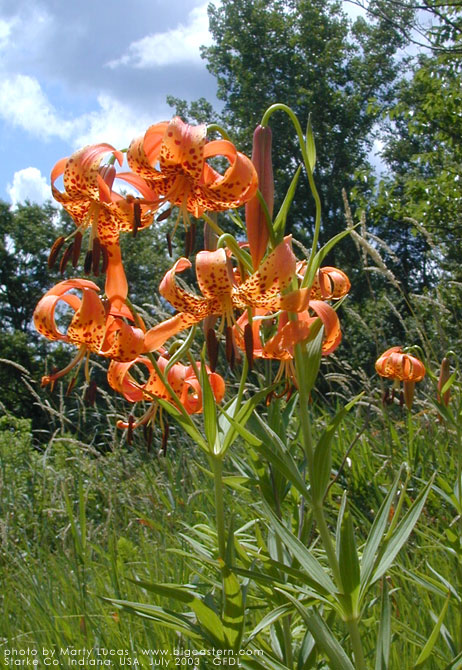
Lilium michiganense

==== Liliales (lilies) ====
Liliales are a large size order (10 families, 67 genera, about 1,500 species) distributed worldwide, particularly in subtropical and temperate regions in the Northern Hemisphere. They are mainly perennial herbaceous and may be climbing plants that include the true lilies and many other geophytes. Their economic importance lies in their use for horticulture and cut flowers. They are also a source of food and pharmaceuticals.

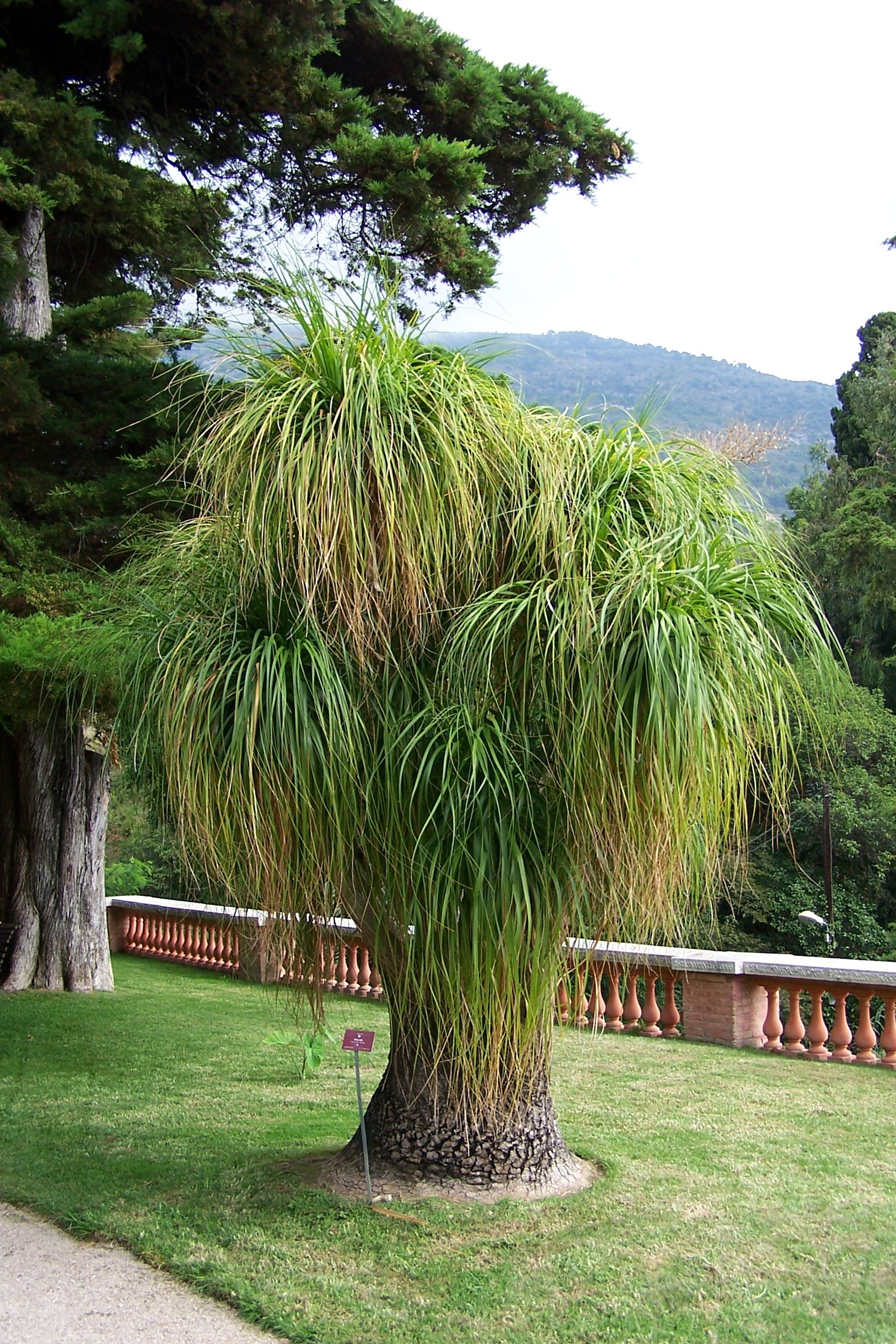
Nolina recurvata

==== Asparagales (includes orchids, irises, agaves, amaryllis, and onions) ====
Asparagales are a large very diverse order (14 families, 1,122 genera, about 36,000 species), including many geophytes, ornamental flowers, vegetables, and spices. Most are herbaceous perennials, but some are trees and climbers.

== See also ==
- Lilianae
- List of systems of plant classification
- List of lilioid families

== Bibliography ==
Books

- Craene, Louis P. Ronse De (2010), Floral diagrams: an aid to understanding flower morphology and evolution, Cambridge: Cambridge University Press, ISBN 9780521493468
- Cronquist, A (1981), An integrated system of classification of flowering plants, New York: Columbia University Press, ISBN 9780231038805
- Dahlgren, R.M.; Clifford, H.T.; Yeo, P.F. (1985), The families of the monocotyledons: Structure, evolution and taxonomy, Berlin: Springer-Verlag, ISBN 978-3-642-64903-5
- Gibbs, Adrian J.; Calisher, Charles H.; García-Arenal, Fernando, eds. (1995), Molecular basis of virus evolution, Cambridge: Cambridge University Press, ISBN 9780521022897
- Glover, Beverley J. (2014) [2007], Understanding flowers and flowering: an integrated approach (2nd ed.), Oxford University Press, ISBN 9780191637629
- Hedges, S. Blair; Kumar, Sudhir, eds. (2009), The timetree of life, Oxford: Oxford University Press, ISBN 9780191560156
- Judd, Walter S.; Campbell, Christopher S.; Kellogg, Elizabeth A.; Stevens, Peter F.; Donoghue, Michael J. (2007), Plant systematics: a phylogenetic approach. (1st ed. 1999, 2nd 2002) (3 ed.), Sinauer Associates, ISBN 978-0-87893-407-2
- Kubitzki, Klaus; Huber, Herbert, eds. (1998), The families and genera of vascular plants. Vol.3. Flowering plants. Monocotyledons: Lilianae (except Orchidaceae), Berlin, Germany: Springer-Verlag, ISBN 3-540-64060-6
- Lindley, John (1830), An introduction to the natural system of botany : or, A systematic view of the organisation, natural affinities, and geographical distribution, of the whole vegetable kingdom : together with the uses of the most important species in medicine, the arts, and rural or domestic economy, London: Longman

Symposia

- Rudall, P.J.; Cribb, P.J.; Cutler, D.F.; Humphries, C.J., eds. (1995), Monocotyledons: systematics and evolution (Proceedings of the International Symposium on Monocotyledons: Systematics and Evolution, Kew 1993), Kew: Royal Botanic Gardens, ISBN 978-0-947643-85-0, archived from the original on 2014-01-05
- Wilson, K. L.; Morrison, D. A., eds. (2000), Monocots: Systematics and evolution (Proceedings of the Second International Conference on the Comparative Biology of the Monocotyledons, Sydney, Australia 1998), Collingwood, Australia: CSIRO, ISBN 0-643-06437-0, see also excerpts in Monocots: Systematics and evolution at Google Books
- Columbus, J. T.; Friar, E. A.; Porter, J. M.; Prince, L. M.; Simpson, M. G., eds. (2006), "Symposium issue: Monocots: comparative biology and evolution (excluding Poales). Proceedings of the Third International Conference on the Comparative Biology of the Monocotyledons, 31 Mar–4 Apr 2003", Aliso, 22 (1), Claremont, Ca.: Rancho Santa Ana Botanic Garden, ISSN 0065-6275
- Wilkin, Paul; Mayo, Simon J, eds. (2013), Early events in monocot evolution, Cambridge: Cambridge University Press, ISBN 978-1-107-01276-9

Chapters

- Chase, M. W.; Duvall, M. R.; Hills, H. G.; Conran, J. G.; Cox, A. V.; Eguiarte, L. E.; Hartwell, J.; Fay, M. F.; Caddick, L. R.; Cameron, K. M.; Hoot, S., Molecular phylogenetics of Lilianae, vol. 1, pp. 109–137, in Rudall et al. (1995)
- Chase, M. W.; Stevenson, D. W.; Wilkin, P.; Rudall, P. J., Monocot systematics: A combined analysis, vol. 2, pp. 685–730, in Rudall et al. (1995)
- Chase, M.W.; Soltis, D. E.; Soltis, P. S.; Rudall, P. J.; Fay, M. F.; Hahn, W. H.; Sullivan, S.; Joseph, J.; Molvray, M.; Kores, P. J.; Givnish, T. J.; Sytsma, K. J.; Pires, J. C., Higher-level systematics of the monocotyledons: An assessment of current knowledge and a new classification, pp. 3–16, in Wilson & Morrison (2000)
- Chase, M. W.; Fay, M. F.; Devey, D. S.; Maurin, O; Rønsted, N; Davies, T. J; Pillon, Y; Petersen, G; Seberg, O; Tamura, M. N.; Asmussen, C. B.; Hilu, K; Borsch, T; Davis, J. I; Stevenson, D. W.; Pires, J. C.; Givnish, T. J.; Sytsma, K. J.; McPherson, M. A.; Graham, S. W.; Rai, H. S., Multigene analyses of monocot relationships : a summary (PDF), pp. 63–75, archived from the original (PDF) on 2016-03-04, in Columbus et al. (2006)
- Davis, Jerrold I.; Mcneal, Joel R.; Barrett, Craig F.; Chase, Mark W.; Cohen, James I.; Duvall, Melvin R.; Givnish, Thomas J.; Graham, Sean W.; Petersen, Gitte; Pires, J. Chris; Seberg, Ole; Stevenson, Dennis W.; Leebens-Mack, Jim (2013), "Contrasting patterns of support among plastid genes and genomes for major clades of the monocotyledons", Early Events in Monocot Evolution, pp. 315–349, doi:10.1017/CBO9781139002950.015, ISBN 9781139002950, in Wilkin & Mayo (2013)
- Graham, S.W.; Zgurski, J.M.; McPherson, M.A.; Cherniawsky, D.M.; Saarela, J.M.; Horne, E.S.C.; Smith, S.Y.; Wong, W.A.; O'Brien, H.E.; Biron, V.L.; Pires, J.C.; Olmstead, R.G.; Chase, M.W.; Rai, H.S., Robust inference of monocot deep phylogeny using an expanded multigene plastid data set (PDF), pp. 3–21, in Columbus et al. (2006)
- Johansen, Bo; Frederiksen, Signe; Skipper, Martin (2006), "Molecular basis of development in petaloid monocot flowers" (PDF), Aliso, 22 (1): 151–158, doi:10.5642/aliso.20062201.12, in Columbus et al. (2006)
- Kron, Kathleen A; Chase, Mark W (17 November 2005), Molecular systematics and seed plant phylogeny: a summary of a parsimony analysis of rbcL sequence data, Cambridge University Press, pp. 243–252, ISBN 9780521022897, in Gibbs et al. (1995)

Articles

- Caddick, Lizabeth R.; Rudall, Paula J.; Wilkin, Paul; Hedderson, Terry A. J.; Chase, Mark W. (February 2002), "Phylogenetics of Dioscoreales based on combined analyses of morphological and molecular data", Botanical Journal of the Linnean Society, 138 (2): 123–144, Bibcode:2002BJLS..138..123C, doi:10.1046/j.1095-8339.2002.138002123.x
- Cameron, Kenneth M.; Chase, Mark W.; Rudall, Paula J. (July 2003), "Recircumscription of the monocotyledonous family Petrosaviaceae to include Japonolirion", Brittonia, 55 (3): 214–225, doi:10.1663/0007-196X(2003)055[0214:ROTMFP]2.0.CO;2, JSTOR 3218442, S2CID 39771490
- Chase, Mark W.; Palmer, Jeffrey D. (December 1989), "Chloroplast DNA Systematics of Lilioid Monocots: Resources, Feasibility, and an Example from the Orchidaceae" (PDF), American Journal of Botany, 76 (12): 1720–1730, doi:10.2307/2444471, hdl:2027.42/141280, JSTOR 2444471
- Chase, Mark W.; Soltis, Douglas E.; Olmstead, Richard G.; Morgan, David; Les, Donald H.; Mishler, Brent D.; Duvall, Melvin R.; Price, Robert A.; Hills, Harold G.; Qiu, Yin-Long; Kron, Kathleen A.; Rettig, Jeffrey H.; Conti, Elena; Palmer, Jeffrey D.; Manhart, James R.; Sytsma, Kenneth J.; Michaels, Helen J.; Kress, W. John; Karol, Kenneth G.; Clark, W. Dennis; Hedren, Mikael; Gaut, Brandon S.; Jansen, Robert K.; Kim, Ki-Joong; Wimpee, Charles F.; Smith, James F.; Furnier, Glenn R.; Strauss, Steven H.; Xiang, Qui-Yun; Plunkett, Gregory M.; Soltis, Pamela S.; Swensen, Susan M.; Williams, Stephen E.; Gadek, Paul A.; Quinn, Christopher J.; Eguiarte, Luis E.; Golenberg, Edward; Learn, Gerald H.; Graham, Sean W.; Barrett, Spencer C. H.; Dayanandan, Selvadurai; Albert, Victor A. (1993), "Phylogenetics of Seed Plants: An Analysis of Nucleotide Sequences from the Plastid Gene rbcL" (PDF), Annals of the Missouri Botanical Garden, 80 (3): 528, Bibcode:1993AnMBG..80..528C, doi:10.2307/2399846, hdl:1969.1/179875, JSTOR 2399846
- Chase, M. W. (1 October 2004), "Monocot relationships: an overview", American Journal of Botany, 91 (10): 1645–1655, doi:10.3732/ajb.91.10.1645, PMID 21652314
- Chase, Mark W; Reveal, James L (2009), "A phylogenetic classification of the land plants to accompany APG III" (PDF), Botanical Journal of the Linnean Society, 161 (2): 122–127, doi:10.1111/j.1095-8339.2009.01002.x
- Duvall, Melvin R.; Clegg, Michael T.; Chase, Mark W.; Clark, W. Dennis; Kress, W. John; Hills, Harold G.; Eguiarte, Luis E.; Smith, James F.; Gaut, Brandon S.; Zimmer, Elizabeth A.; Learn, Gerald H. (1 January 1993), "Phylogenetic Hypotheses for the Monocotyledons Constructed from rbcL Sequence Data", Annals of the Missouri Botanical Garden, 80 (3): 607–619, Bibcode:1993AnMBG..80..607D, doi:10.2307/2399849, JSTOR 2399849
- Furness, Carol A.; Rudall, Paula J. (January 2001), "Pollen and anther characters in monocot systematics", Grana, 40 (1–2): 17–25, Bibcode:2001Grana..40...17F, doi:10.1080/00173130152591840
- Hertweck, Kate L.; Kinney, Michael S.; Stuart, Stephanie A.; Maurin, Olivier; Mathews, Sarah; Chase, Mark W.; Gandolfo, Maria A.; Pires, J. Chris (July 2015), "Phylogenetics, divergence times and diversification from three genomic partitions in monocots", Botanical Journal of the Linnean Society, 178 (3): 375–393, doi:10.1111/boj.12260
- Heywood, V H (1981), "C. D. Brickell, D. F. Cutler and Mary Gregory (Editors). Petaloid Monocotyledons, Horticultural and Botanical Research. Linnean Society Symposium Series No. 8, xii +222pp. Academic Press, London, 1980, £26.80. $62.00" (Book review), Ann Bot, 48 (4): 574–575, doi:10.1093/oxfordjournals.aob.a086164
- Hutchinson, John (1936), "A new phylogenetic classification of the monocotyledons", Proceedings of the Zesde Internationaal Botanisch Congres, Amsterdam, 2–7 September 1935, ii: 129–131
- Kim, Jung Sung; Hong, Jeong-Ki; Chase, Mark W.; Fay, Michael F.; Kim, Joo-Hwan (May 2013). "Familial relationships of the monocot order Liliales based on a molecular phylogenetic analysis using four plastid loci: matK, rbcL, atpB and atpF-H". Botanical Journal of the Linnean Society. 172 (1): 5–21. doi:10.1111/boj.12039.
- Meerow, A.W. (2002), "The new phylogeny of the Lilioid Monocotyledons", Acta Horticulturae, 570 (570): 31–45, doi:10.17660/ActaHortic.2002.570.2, archived from the original on 2016-01-27
- Mondragon-Palomino, M.; Theissen, G. (13 January 2009), "Why are orchid flowers so diverse? Reduction of evolutionary constraints by paralogues of class B floral homeotic genes", Annals of Botany, 104 (3): 583–594, doi:10.1093/aob/mcn258, PMC 2720651, PMID 19141602
- Pires, J.C.; Maureira, I.J.; Givnish, T.J.; Sytsma, K.J.; Seberg, O.; Petersen, G.; Davis, J. I.; Stevenson, D.W.; Rudall, P.J.; Fay, M.F. & Chase, M.W. (2006), "Phylogeny, genome size, and chromosome evolution of Asparagales", Aliso, 22: 278–304, doi:10.5642/aliso.20062201.24
- Rudall, Paula (March 2002), "Homologies of Inferior Ovaries and Septal Nectaries in Monocotyledons", International Journal of Plant Sciences, 163 (2): 261–276, Bibcode:2002IJPlS.163..261R, doi:10.1086/338323, S2CID 84714002
- Rudall, Paula J.; Bateman, Richard M. (August 2002), "Roles of synorganisation, zygomorphy and heterotopy in floral evolution: the gynostemium and labellum of orchids and other lilioid monocots", Biological Reviews of the Cambridge Philosophical Society, 77 (3): 403–441, doi:10.1017/S1464793102005936, PMID 12227521, S2CID 13545733
- Rudall, Paula J.; Bateman, Richard M. (1 April 2006). "Morphological Phylogenetic Analysis of Pandanales: Testing Contrasting Hypotheses of Floral Evolution". Systematic Botany. 31 (2): 223–238. Bibcode:2006SysBo..31..223R. doi:10.1600/036364406777585766. S2CID 86213914.
- Thorne, Robert F. (February 1983), "Proposed new realignments in the angiosperms", Nordic Journal of Botany, 3 (1): 85–117, Bibcode:1983NorJB...3...85T, doi:10.1111/j.1756-1051.1983.tb01447.x
- Thorne, Robert F (1992), "An updated phylogenetic classification of the flowering plants", Aliso, 13 (2): 365–389, doi:10.5642/aliso.19921302.08, S2CID 85738663
- Zeng, Liping; Zhang, Qiang; Sun, Renran; Kong, Hongzhi; Zhang, Ning; Ma, Hong (24 September 2014), "Resolution of deep angiosperm phylogeny using conserved nuclear genes and estimates of early divergence times", Nature Communications, 5 (4956): 4956, Bibcode:2014NatCo...5.4956Z, doi:10.1038/ncomms5956, PMC 4200517, PMID 25249442
- Zomlefer, Wendy B.; Williams, Norris H.; Whitten, W. Mark; Judd, Walter S. (September 2001). "Generic circumscription and relationships in the tribe Melanthieae (Liliales, Melanthiaceae), with emphasis on Zigadenus: evidence from ITS and trnL-F sequence data". American Journal of Botany. 88 (9): 1657–1669. Bibcode:2001AmJB...88.1657Z. doi:10.2307/3558411. JSTOR 3558411. PMID 21669700.

APG

- Angiosperm Phylogeny Group (1998), "An ordinal classification for the families of flowering plants", Annals of the Missouri Botanical Garden, 85 (4): 531–53, Bibcode:1998AnMBG..85..531., doi:10.2307/2992015, JSTOR 2992015
- Angiosperm Phylogeny Group (2003), "An Update of the Angiosperm Phylogeny Group Classification for the orders and families of flowering plants: APG II", Botanical Journal of the Linnean Society, 141 (4): 399–436, doi:10.1046/j.1095-8339.2003.t01-1-00158.x
- Angiosperm Phylogeny Group III (2009), "An update of the Angiosperm Phylogeny Group classification for the orders and families of flowering plants: APG III", Botanical Journal of the Linnean Society, 161 (2): 105–121, doi:10.1111/j.1095-8339.2009.00996.x, hdl:10654/18083

Websites

- Department of Botany, University of Wisconsin-Madison, Diversity and Evolution of Monocots: Lilioids (Botany 400 lecture notes)
- University of Alberta (1999), Monocots: (II) – Liliales & Asparagales (PDF), archived from the original (Botany 220 lecture notes) on 2016-01-28
- World Checklist of Selected Plant Families, Royal Botanic Gardens, Kew
- Royal Botanic Gardens, Kew (2016), Monocots I: General Alismatids & Lilioids, archived from the original on 2015-09-14
- Stevens, P.F. (2016) [2001], Angiosperm Phylogeny Website, Missouri Botanical Garden
