= Perianth =

Non-reproductive part of a flower

A mature flower. In this example, the perianth is separated into a calyx (sepals) and corolla (petals)

The perianth (perigonium, perigon or perigone in monocots) is the non-reproductive part of a flower. It is a structure consisting of the calyx (sepals) and the corolla (petals); in perigones it consists of the tepals. It forms an envelope surrounding the sexual organs,. The term perianth is derived from Greek περί (peri, "around") and άνθος (anthos, "flower"), while perigonium is derived from περί (peri) and γόνος (gonos, "seed, sex organs"). In the mosses and liverworts (Marchantiophyta), the perianth is the sterile (neither male nor female) tube-like tissue that surrounds the female reproductive structure or developing sporophyte.

== Flowering plants ==
In flowering plants, the perianth may be described as being either dichlamydeous/heterochlamydeous in which the calyx and corolla are clearly separate, or homochlamydeous, in which they are indistinguishable (and the sepals and petals are collectively referred to as tepals). When the perianth is in two whorls, it is described as biseriate. While the calyx may be green, known as sepaloid, it may also be brightly coloured, and is then described as petaloid. When the undifferentiated tepals resemble petals, they are also referred to as "petaloid", as in petaloid monocots or liliod monocots, orders of monocots with brightly coloured tepals. The corolla and petals have a role in attracting pollinators, but this may be augmented by more specialised structures like the corona (see below).

When the perianth consists of separate tepals the term apotepalous is used, or syntepalous if the tepals are fused to one another. The petals may be united to form a tubular corolla (gamopetalous or sympetalous). If either the petals or sepals are entirely absent, the perianth can be described as being monochlamydeous.

Types of perianth
Achlamydeous floral meristem without a corolla or calyx

Monochlamydeous perianth with non-petaloid calyx only

Monochlamydeous perianth with corolla only or homochlamydeous perigonium with tepals

Dichlamydeous/heterochlamydeous perianth with separate whorls

Both sepals and petals may have stomata and veins, even if vestigial. In some taxa, for instance some magnolias and water lilies, the perianth is arranged in a spiral on nodes, rather than whorls. Flowers with spiral perianths tend to also be those with undifferentiated perianths.

=== Corona ===
Ligulate floret, typical for some members of the family Asteraceae: A. inferior ovary B. The calyx is a crown-shaped pappus, called a corona. C. Anthers are united in a tube around the style, though the filaments are separate. D. A ligulate petal extends from the tubular corolla. E. style and stigmas

An additional structure in some plants (e.g. Narcissus, Passiflora (passion flower), some Hippeastrum, Liliaceae) is the corona (paraperigonium, paraperigon, or paracorolla), a ring or set of appendages of adaxial tissue arising from the corolla or the outer edge of the stamens. It is often positioned where the corolla lobes arise from the corolla tube. There can be more than one corona in a flower. The milkweeds (Asclepias spp.) have three very different coronas, which collectively form a flytrap pollination scheme. Some passionflowers (Passiflora spp.) have as many as eight coronas arranged in concentric whorls.

The pappus of Asteraceae, considered to be a modified calyx, is also called a corona if it is shaped like a crown.

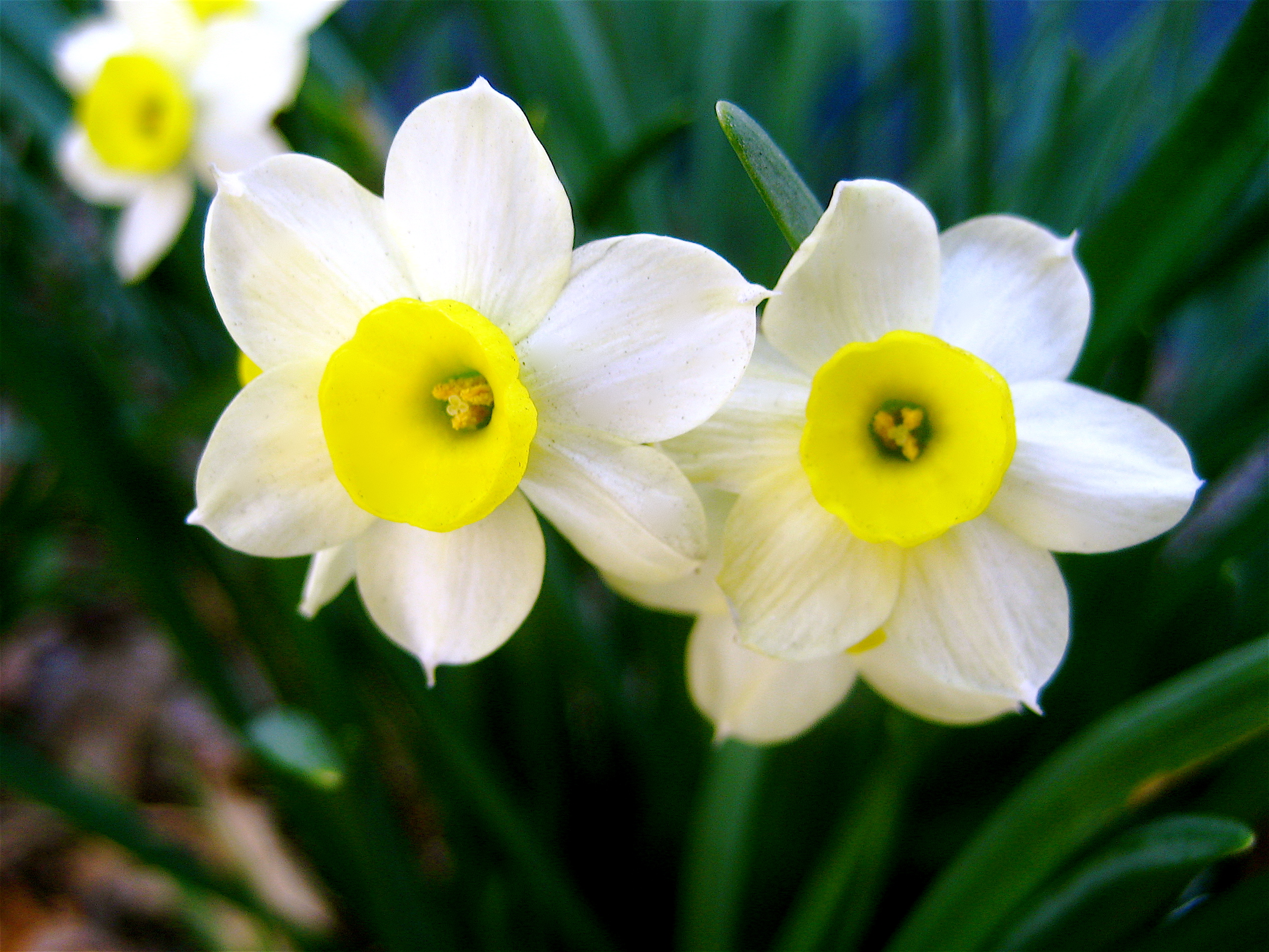
Flower of Narcissus showing an outer white corolla with a central yellow corona (paraperigonium)

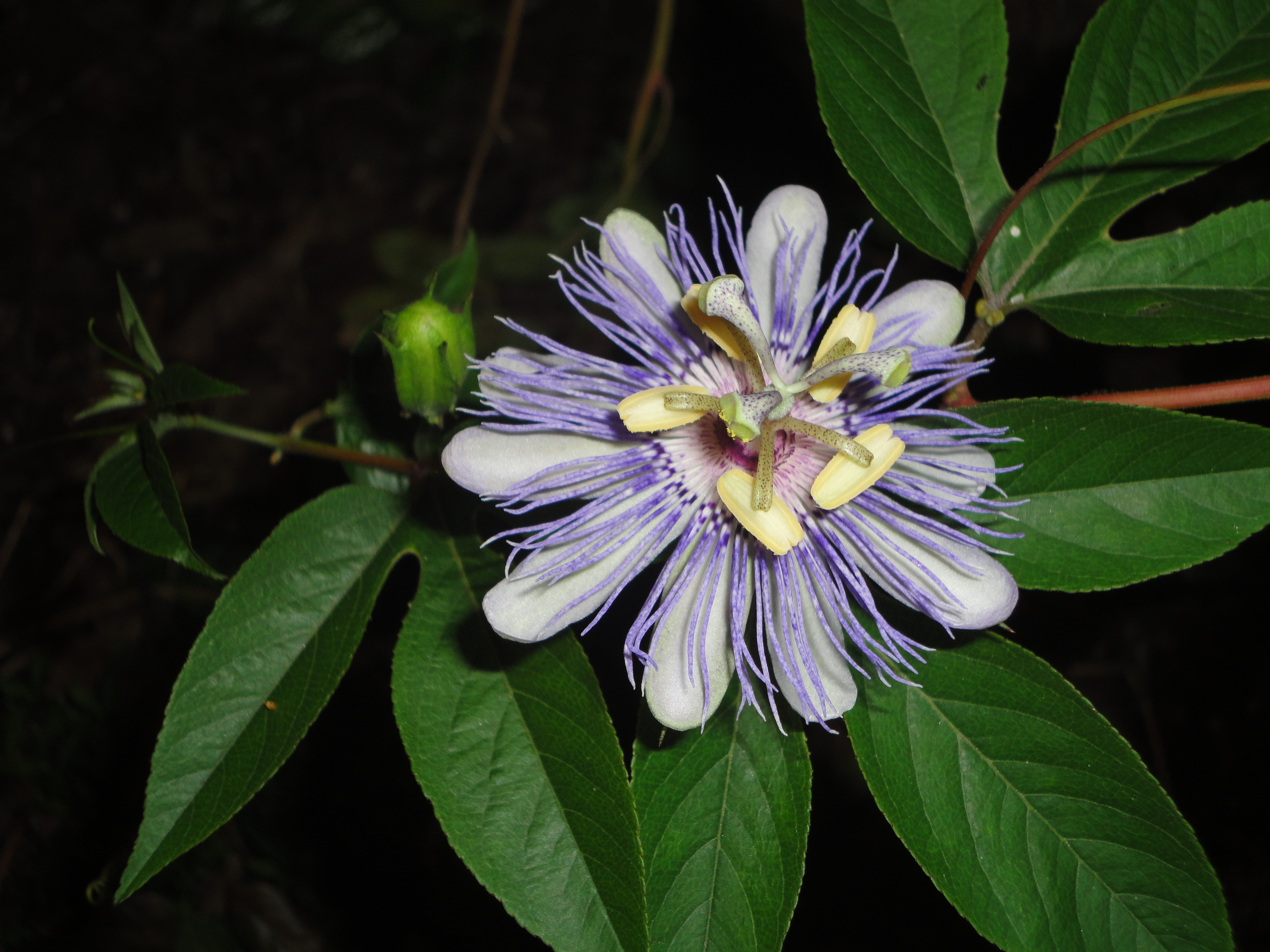
Flower of Passiflora incarnata showing corona of fine appendages between petals and stamens

== Bibliography ==
- Simpson, Michael G. (2011). Plant Systematics. Academic Press. ISBN 978-0-08-051404-8.
