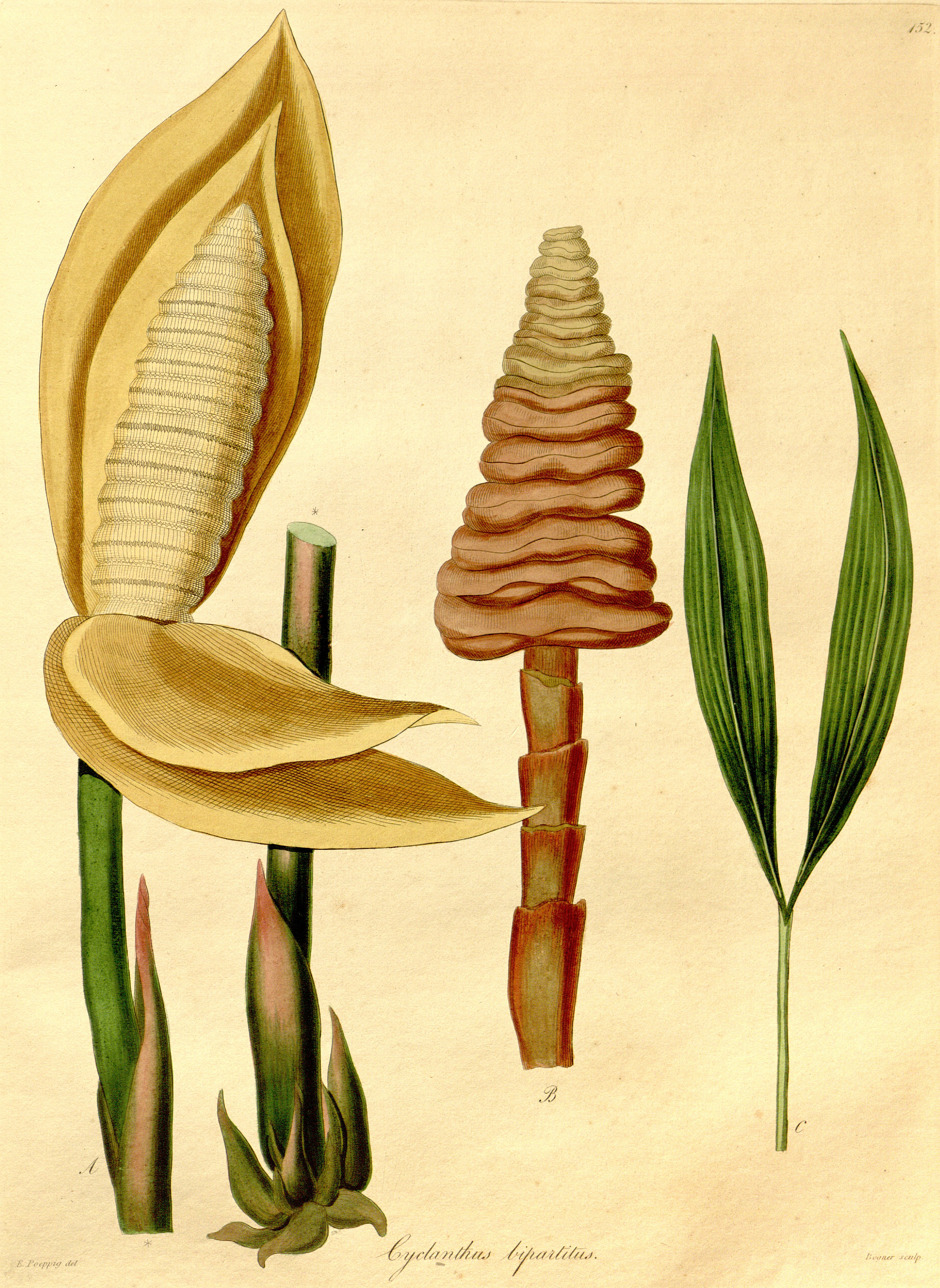
- Cyclanthus bipartitus

Scientific classification
- Kingdom: Plantae
- Clade: Tracheophytes
- Clade: Angiosperms
- Clade: Monocots
- Order: Pandanales
- Family: Cyclanthaceae
- Genus: Cyclanthus
- Species: C. bipartitus

Binomial name
- Cyclanthus bipartitus Poit. ex A.Rich.

Synonyms
- Cyclanthus plumieri Poit. ex A.Rich.; Cyclanthus bifolius Perr.; Cyclanthus cristatus Klotzsch; Discanthus odoratus Spruce; Cyclanthus estaba Schaedtler; Cyclanthus bipartitus var. gracilis Drude

= Cyclanthus bipartitus =

Species of flowering plant

Cyclanthus bipartitus a species of plant in the family Cyclanthaceae, first described as a genus in 1824. It is native to southern Mexico, Central America, Trinidad, Windward Islands, northern South America (Venezuela, the Guianas, Colombia, Ecuador, Peru, Bolivia, northwestern Brazil).
