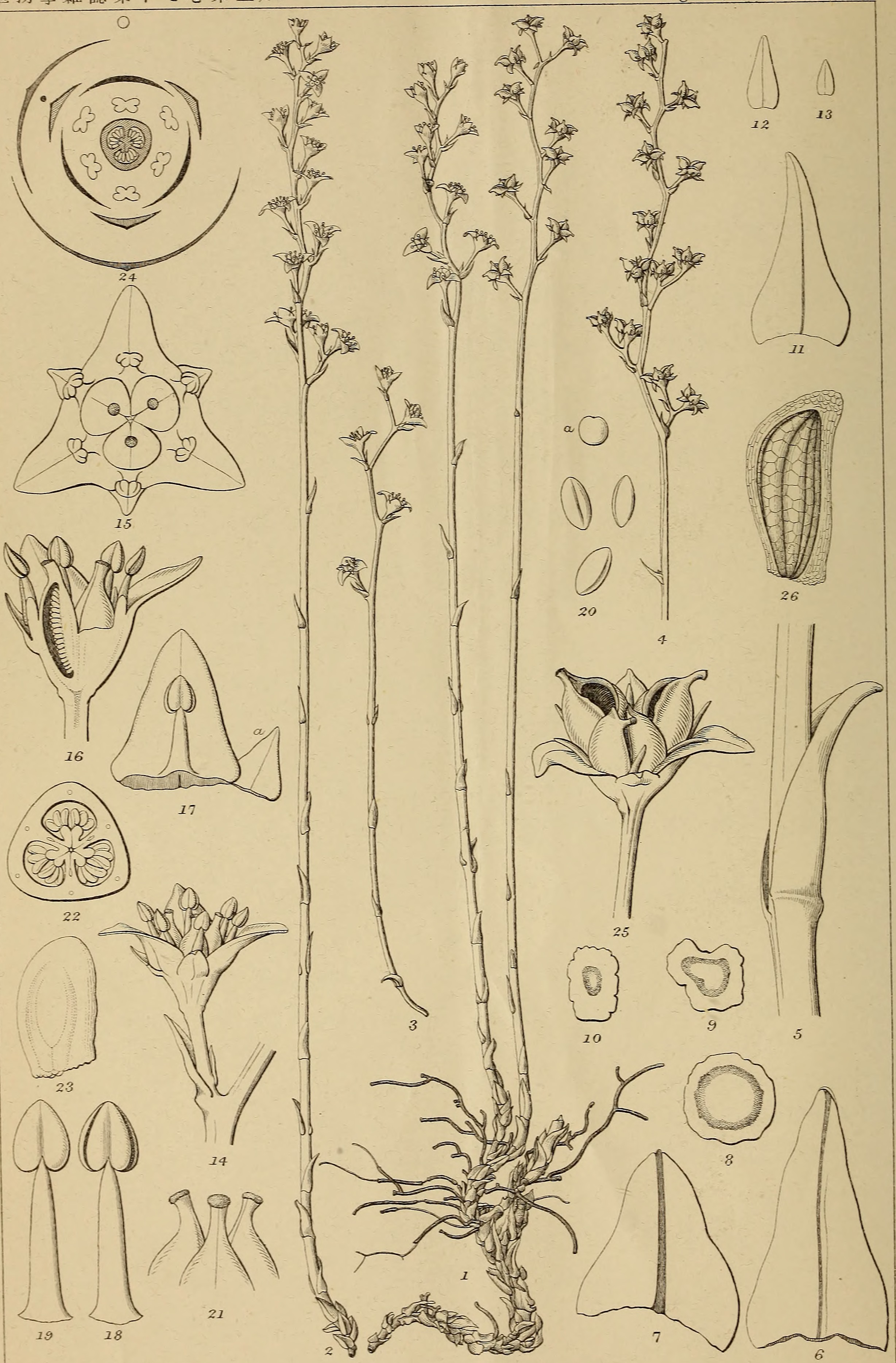
- Petrosavia sakuraii

Scientific classification
- Kingdom: Plantae
- Clade: Embryophytes
- Clade: Tracheophytes
- Clade: Spermatophytes
- Clade: Angiosperms
- Clade: Monocots
- Order: Petrosaviales; Takht.
- Family: Petrosaviaceae; Hutch.

Type species
- Petrosavia stellaris Becc.

Genera
- Japonolirion; Petrosavia

= Petrosaviaceae =

Family of flowering plants

Petrosaviaceae is a family of flowering plants belonging to a monotypic order, Petrosaviales. Petrosaviales are monocots, and are grouped within the lilioid monocots. Petrosaviales is a very small order composed of one family, two genera and four species accepted in 2016. Some species are photosynthetic (Japonolirion) and others are rare, leafless, chlorophyllous, mycoheterotrophic plants (Petrosavia). The family is found in low-light montane rainforests in Japan, China, Southeast Asia and Borneo. They are characterised by having bracteate racemes, pedicellate flowers, six persistent tepals, septal nectaries, three almost-distinct carpels, simultaneous microsporogenesis, monosulcate pollen, and follicular fruit.

== Taxonomy ==
The family has only been recognized in modern classifications; previously, the family members were typically treated as belonging to the Liliaceae. The APG II system recognized the family and assigned it to the clade monocots, unplaced as to order. The APG III system of 2009 and the APG IV system of 2016 placed the family Petrosaviaceae in the order Petrosaviales.

=== Genera ===
As of June 2016, two genera are accepted by the World Checklist of Selected Plant Families:

- Japonolirion Nakai, with one species
- Petrosavia Becc, with three species

== Distribution and habitat ==
The plant species in both genera are found in high-elevation habitats.

== Bibliography ==
- Cameron, Kenneth M.; Chase, Mark W.; Rudall, Paula J. (July 2003), "Recircumscription of the monocotyledonous family Petrosaviaceae to include Japonolirion", Brittonia, 55 (3): 214–225, doi:10.1663/0007-196X(2003)055[0214:ROTMFP]2.0.CO;2, JSTOR 3218442, S2CID 39771490
