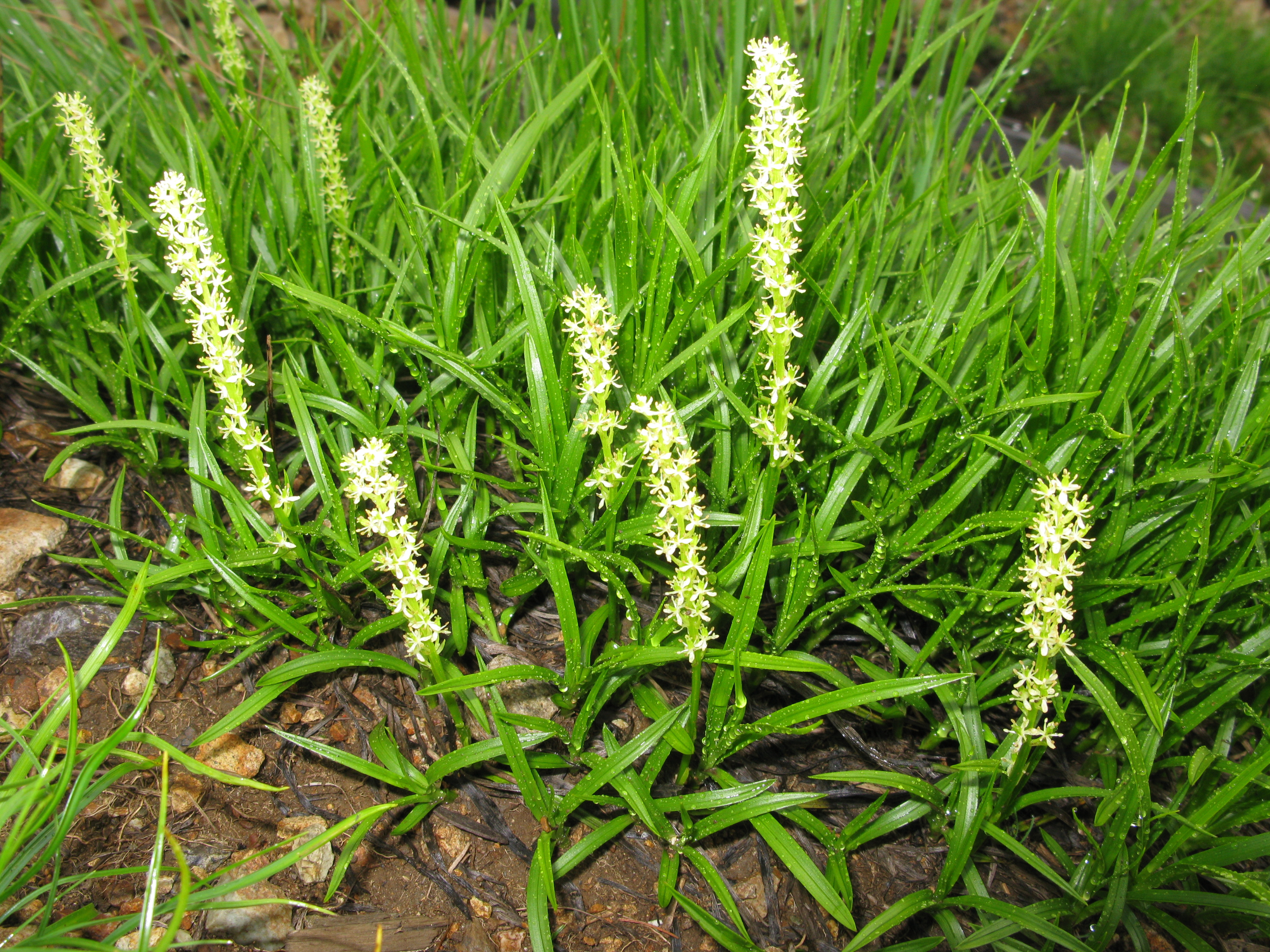

Scientific classification
- Kingdom: Plantae
- Clade: Embryophytes
- Clade: Tracheophytes
- Clade: Spermatophytes
- Clade: Angiosperms
- Clade: Monocots
- Order: Petrosaviales
- Family: Petrosaviaceae
- Genus: Japonolirion; Nakai
- Species: J. osense

Binomial name
- Japonolirion osense Nakai

Synonyms
- Japonolirion saitoi Makino & Tatew.

= Japonolirion =

Genus of flowering plants

Japonolirion is a genus of plants in the family Petrosaviaceae. There is only one known species, Japonolirion osense, endemic to Japan. It is found in grasslands, wetlands and alpine meadows.

== Description ==
Japonolirion osense is a herbaceous, perennial plant with subterranean creeping rootstocks. Its green, linear leaves are set in a rosette, and are 3–20 cm (1.2–7.9 in) long and 1–4 mm (0.039–0.157 in) wide, with 7-9 veins, and rough margins. The leaf base encloses the younger leaves. The flowers are facing upwards and are set with 20–40 in a raceme of 3–8 cm (1.2–3.1 in) long, on an inflorescence stalk of 10–20 cm (3.9–7.9 in) long that carries membranous bracts. The flower stalks emerge from shoots that carried leaves during the previous year, so it stands separately from the current leaf rosette. Each flower consists of 6 cream-coloured tepals, the outer 3 about 1.5 mm (0.059 in) long and the inner about 2.5 mm (0.098 in) long. There are 6 stamens of about 1.5 mm long, each carrying a yellow anther. The ovary matures into three free green carpels that later develop into oval capsules of about 2.5 mm in length. Flowering occurs in July and August.
