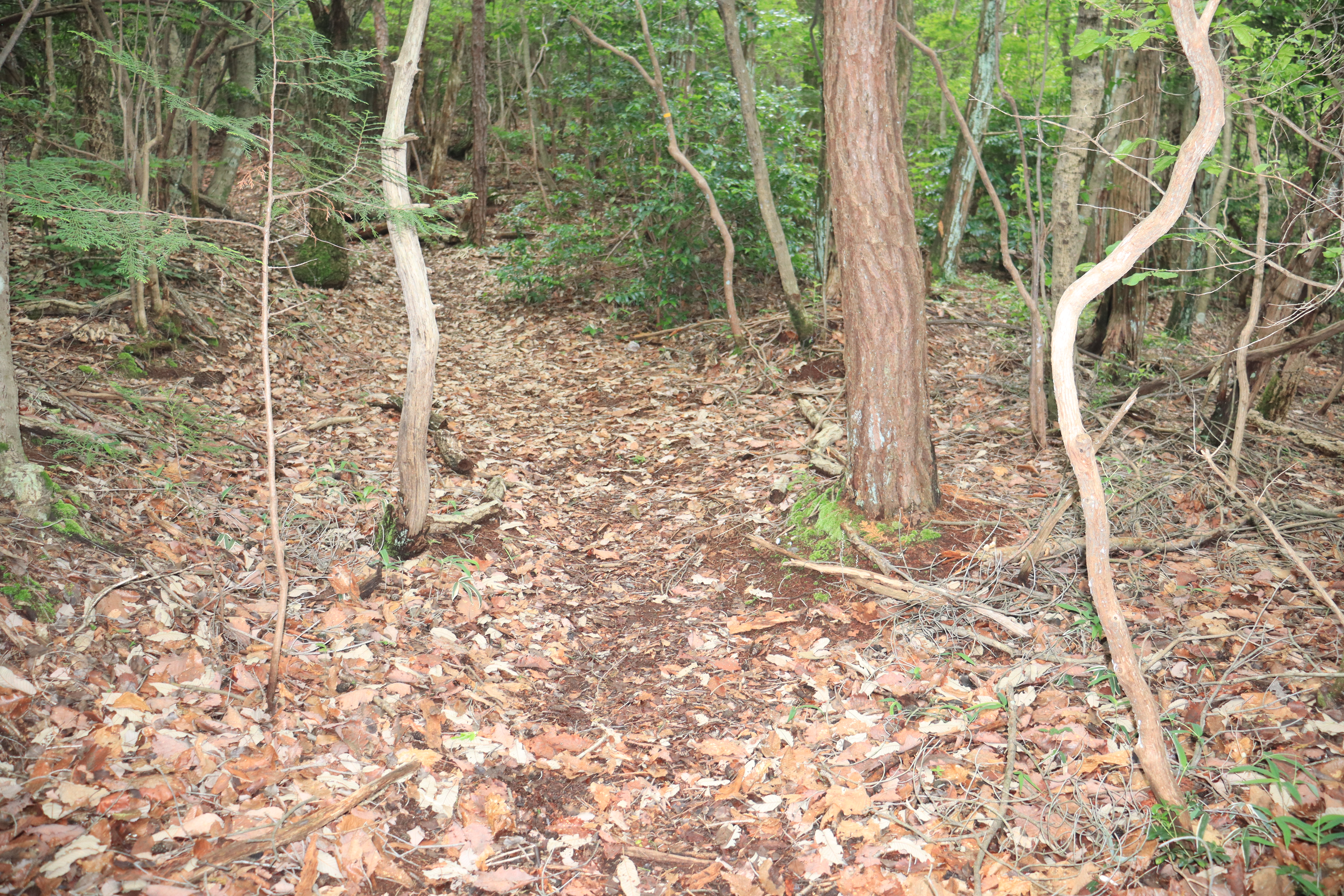
- Petrosavia sakuraii in Japan

Scientific classification
- Kingdom: Plantae
- Clade: Tracheophytes
- Clade: Angiosperms
- Clade: Monocots
- Order: Petrosaviales
- Family: Petrosaviaceae
- Genus: Petrosavia; Becc.

Type species
- Petrosavia stellaris Becc.

Synonyms
- Protolirion Ridl.; Miyoshia Makino

= Petrosavia =

Genus of flowering plants

Petrosavia is a genus in the family Petrosaviaceae. There are two mycoheterotrophic species, native to eastern and southeastern Asia.

- Petrosavia sakuraii (Makino) J.J.Sm. ex Steenis (syn P. miyoshia-sakuraii) – Japan (Mino Province), China (Guangxi, Sichuan), Taiwan, Vietnam, Myanmar, Sumatra
- Petrosavia stellaris Becc. – Borneo, Sulawesi, Sumatra, Peninsular Malaysia
