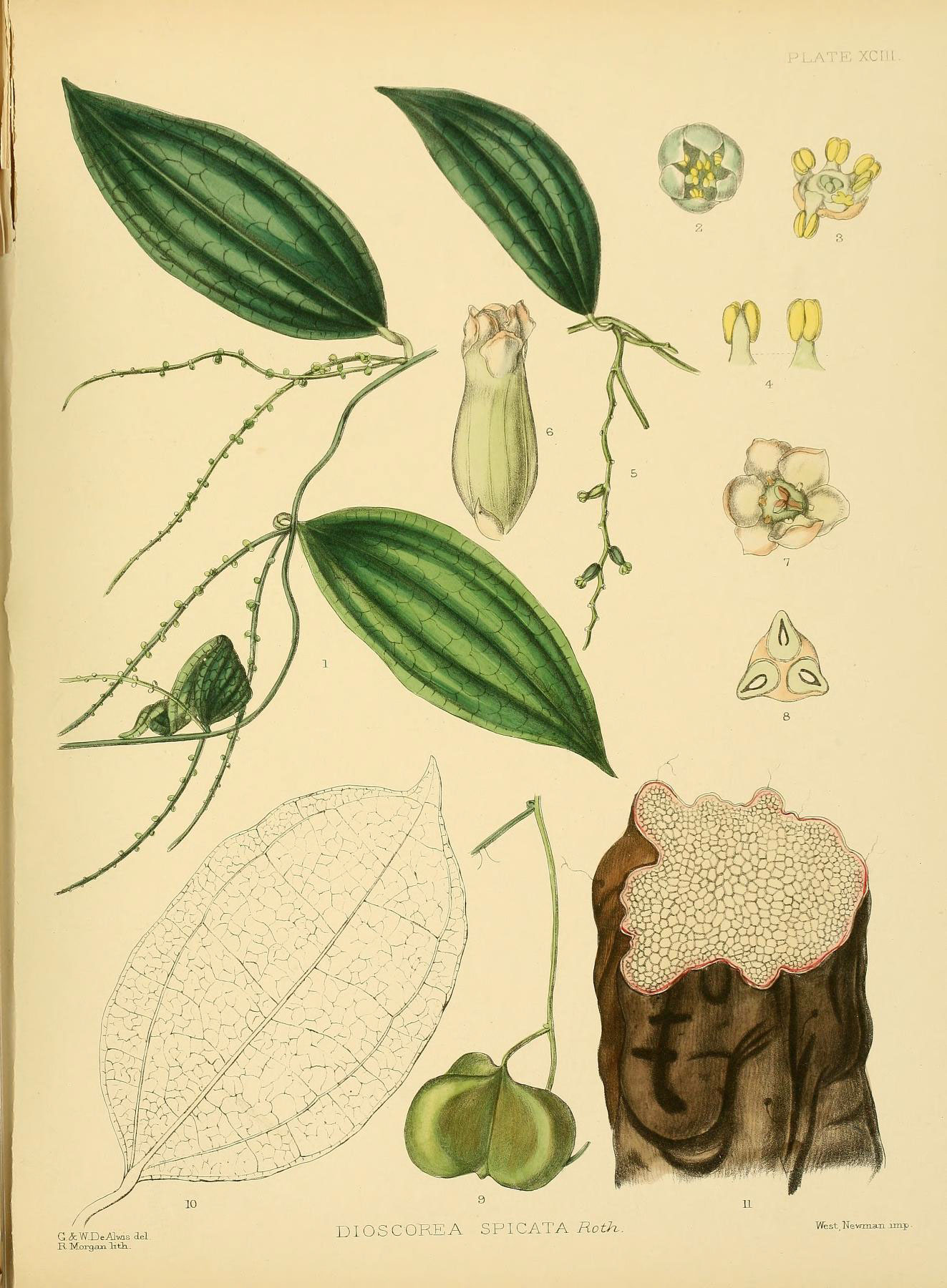

Scientific classification
- Kingdom: Plantae
- Clade: Tracheophytes
- Clade: Angiosperms
- Clade: Monocots
- Order: Dioscoreales
- Family: Dioscoreaceae
- Genus: Dioscorea
- Species: D. spicata

Binomial name
- Dioscorea spicata Roth

Synonyms
- Dioscorea spicata parvifolia; Dioscorea spicata anamallayana; Dioscorea nummularia glauca

= Dioscorea spicata =

Species of herbaceous vine

Dioscorea spicata is a herbaceous perennial in the family Dioscoreaceae.

== Taxonomy ==
First described by Albrecht Wilhelm Roth in 1821. It is placed in Section Enantiophyllum.

== Distribution ==
Indian subcontinent (see map in eMonocot).

== Uses ==
The tubers are use as a food source.

== Bibliography ==
- Thompson, A.K. (2014). Fruit and vegetables: harvesting, handling and storage (3rd ed.). John Wiley. ISBN 9781118654019.
