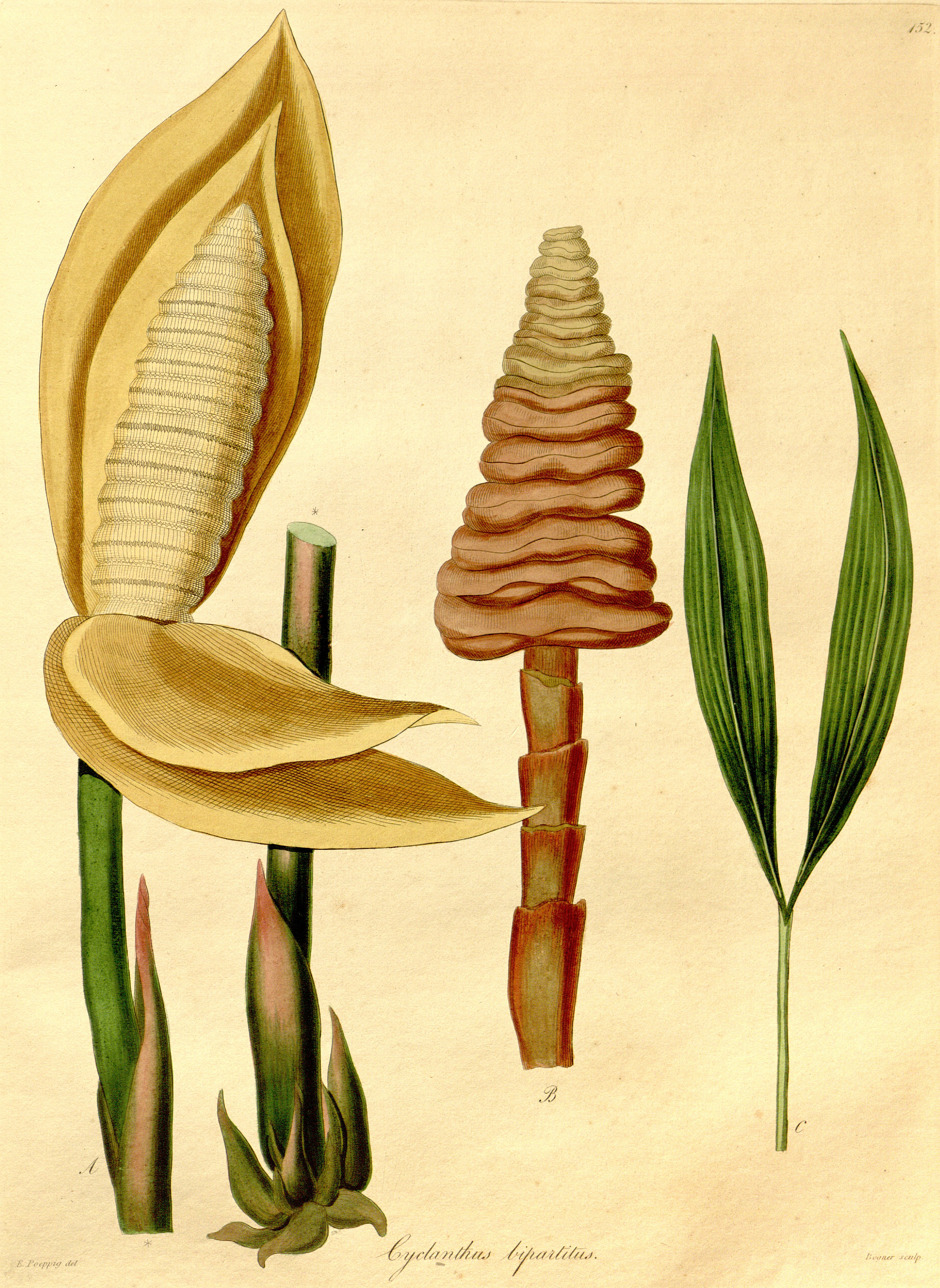
- Cyclanthus bipartitus

Scientific classification
- Kingdom: Plantae
- Clade: Tracheophytes
- Clade: Angiosperms
- Clade: Monocots
- Order: Pandanales
- Family: Cyclanthaceae
- Genus: Cyclanthus; Poit. ex A.Rich.

Synonyms
- Cyclosanthes Poepp.; Discanthus Spruce

= Cyclanthus =

Genus of flowering plants

Cyclanthus is a genus of plants in the family Cyclanthaceae, first described as a genus in 1824. It is native to tropical Latin America and the West Indies. It consists of large, palm-like monocots.

Species

- Cyclanthus bipartitus Poit. ex A.Rich. - southern Mexico, Central America, Trinidad, Windward Islands, northern South America (Venezuela, the Guianas, Colombia, Ecuador, Peru, Bolivia, northwestern Brazil)
- Cyclanthus indivisus R.E.Schult. - Panama, Colombia
