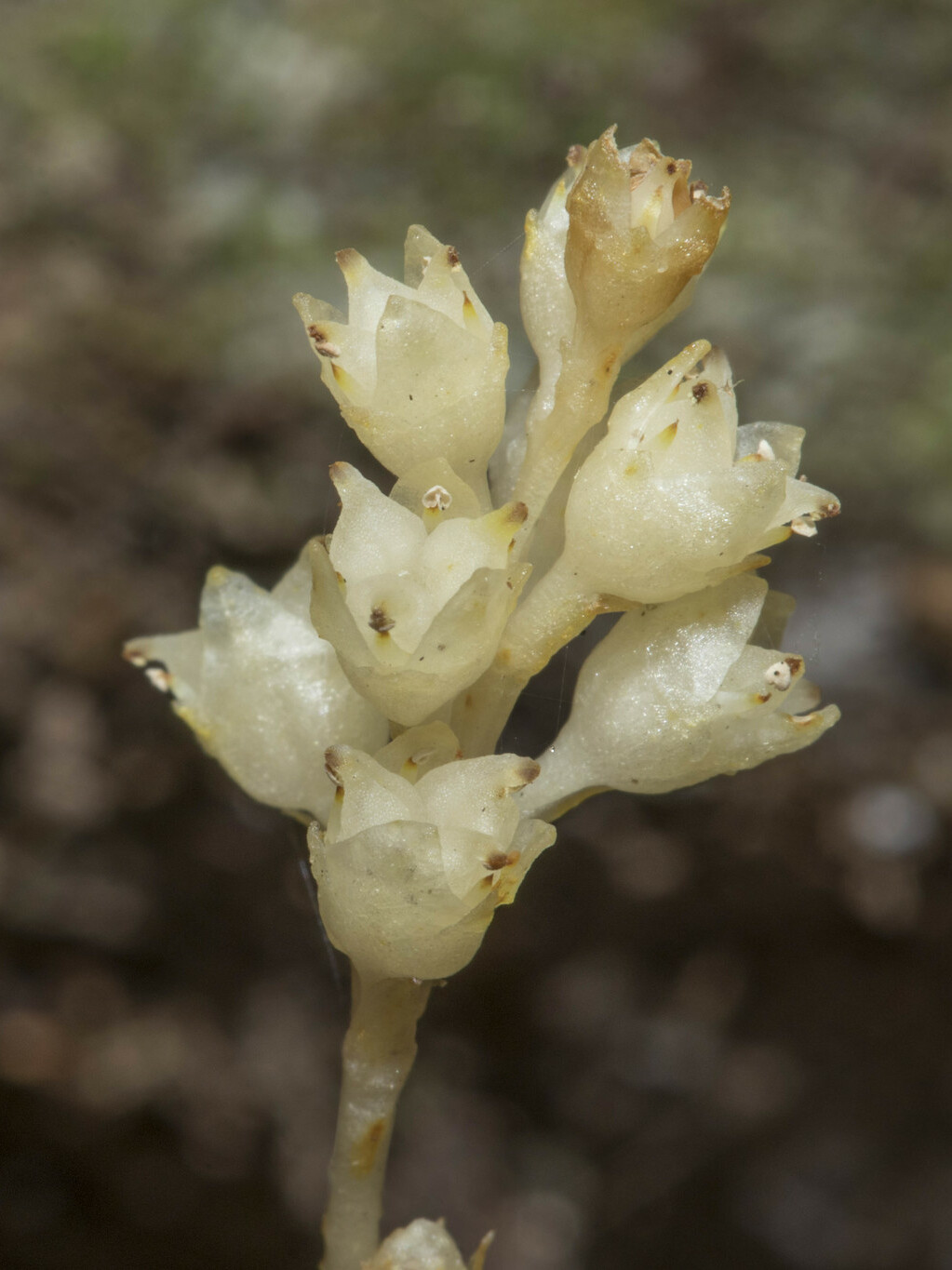

Scientific classification
- Kingdom: Plantae
- Clade: Tracheophytes
- Clade: Angiosperms
- Clade: Monocots
- Order: Petrosaviales
- Family: Petrosaviaceae
- Genus: Petrosavia
- Species: P. sakuraii

Binomial name
- Petrosavia sakuraii (Makino) J.J.Sm. ex Steenis

Synonyms
- Protolirion sakuraii (Makino) Dandy; Protolirion miyoshia-sakuraii Makino, nom. illeg.; Petrosavia miyoshia-sakuraii Makino; Miyoshia sakuraii Makino

= Petrosavia sakuraii =

Species of flowering plant

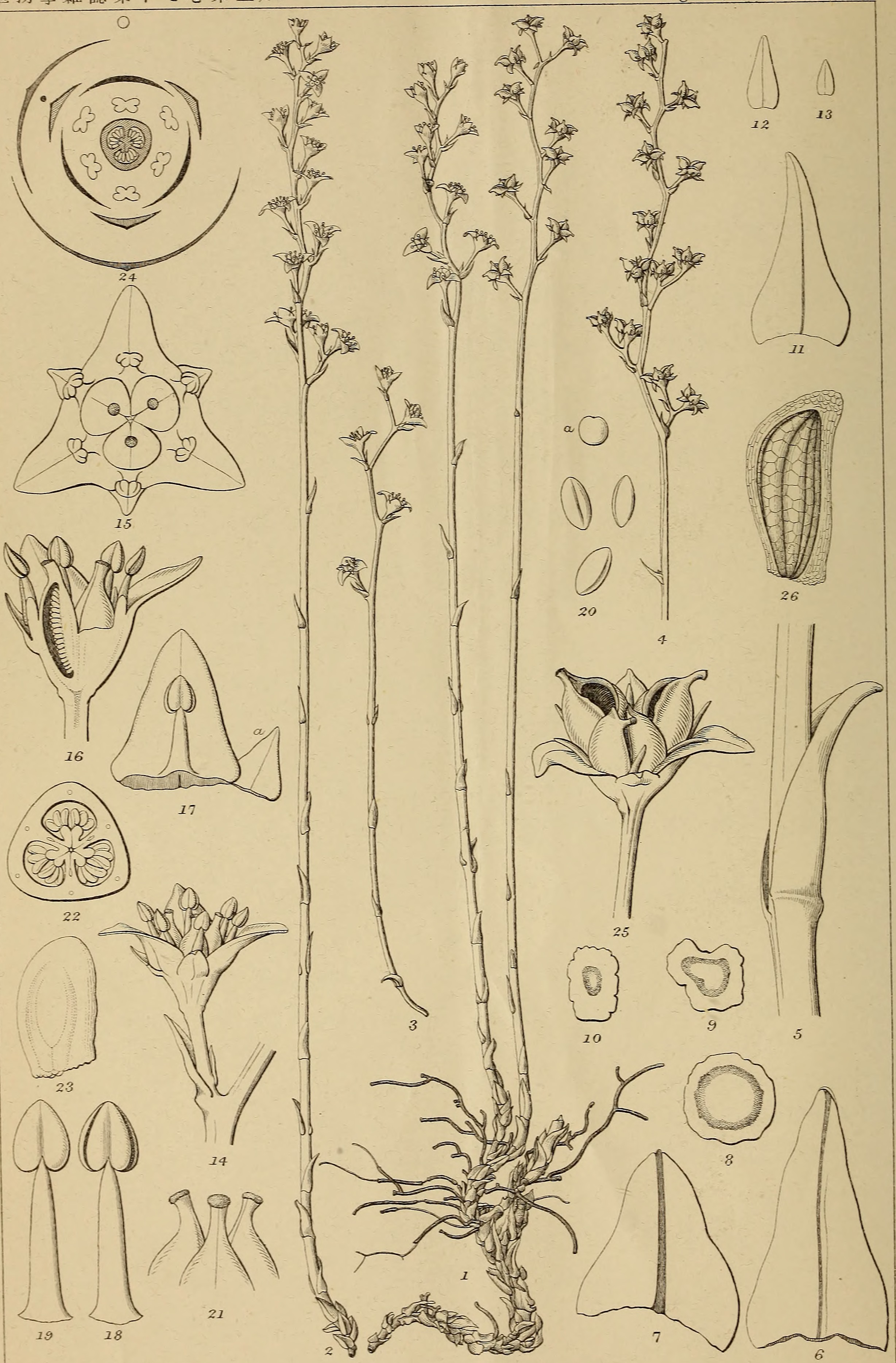

Petrosavia sakuraii, one of three species in the genus Petrosavia, is a monocotyledonous plant first described by Tomitaro Makino in 1903 (see illustration), distributed in eastern and south-eastern Asia. They are rare leafless achlorophyllous, mycoheterotrophic plants found in dark montane rainforests.

== Distribution ==
Japan (Mino Province), China (Guangxi, Sichuan, Taiwan), Vietnam, Myanmar, Sumatra.

== Bibliography ==
- Cameron, Kenneth M.; Chase, Mark W.; Rudall, Paula J. (July 2003), "Recircumscription of the monocotyledonous family Petrosaviaceae to include Japonolirion", Brittonia, 55 (3): 214–225, doi:10.1663/0007-196X(2003)055[0214:ROTMFP]2.0.CO;2, JSTOR 3218442, S2CID 39771490
