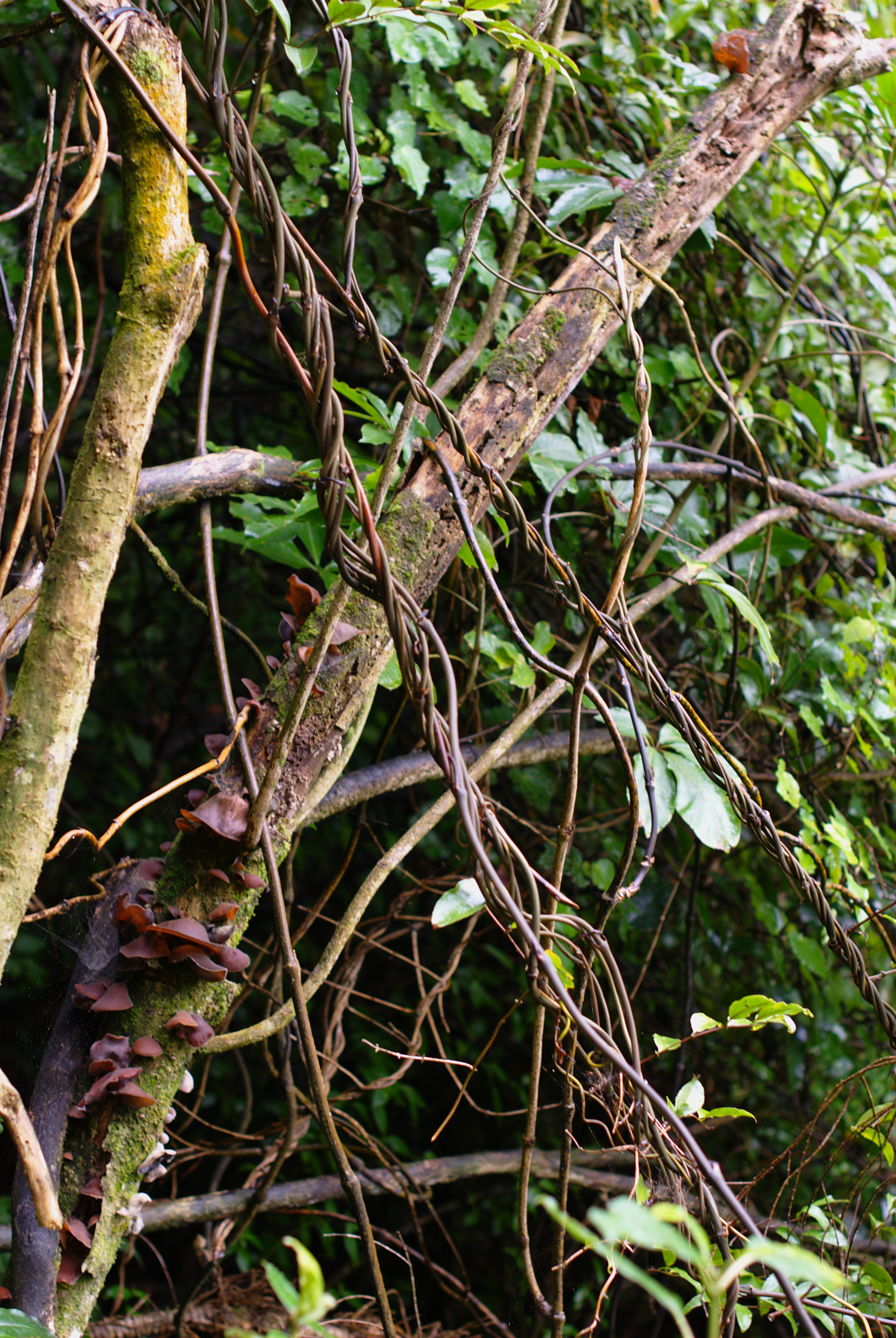
- Ripogonum scandens in New Zealand

Scientific classification
- Kingdom: Plantae
- Clade: Tracheophytes
- Clade: Angiosperms
- Clade: Monocots
- Order: Liliales
- Family: Ripogonaceae; Conran & Clifford
- Genus: Ripogonum; J.R.Forst. & G.Forst.

Type species
- Ripogonum scandens J.R.Forst. & G.Forst.

Species
- See text
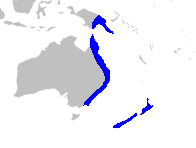
- Ripogonum distribution map

= Ripogonum =

Genus of flowering plants

Ripogonum (sometimes Rhipogonum) is a genus of flowering plants confined to eastern Australia, New Zealand, and New Guinea. Until recently this genus was included in the family Smilacaceae, and earlier in the family Liliaceae, but it has now been separated as its own family Ripogonaceae (sometimes Rhipogonaceae).

Like most species of the closely related Smilacaceae, most species of Ripogonum are woody vines. Differences from Smilacaceae include that Ripogonum lacks stipules, it has a wet rather than dry stigma, its seeds and leaves contain starch, and its guard cells contain oil.

== Description ==
The six species of Ripogonum are perennials, either vines or shrubs. The leaves, which may have several different arrangements, lack stipules. The stems may have prickles. The Australian species are bisexual; others are unisexual. Individual flowers have six white to pale green or yellow tepals. The ovary has three locules with two ovules per locule. The fruit is a berry with a few brown seeds.

== Taxonomy ==
In 1769, during explorer Lieutenant James Cook's first voyage of discovery, botanists Joseph Banks and Daniel Solander collected specimens of "supplejack" (Ripogonum scandens) in New Zealand. The species was described in Solander's unpublished manuscript Primitiae Florae Novae Zelandiae and was illustrated by Sydney Parkinson. Cook again visited New Zealand in 1773 during his second voyage. While anchored at Dusky Bay (now Dusky Sound) in the South Island of New Zealand, he remarked in his journal:

In many parts the woods are so over-run with supplejacks, that it is scarcely possible to force one's way amongst them. I have seen several which were fifty or sixty fathoms long.

During this voyage naturalist Johann Reinhold Forster, assisted by his son Georg Forster collected plant specimens, the elder Forster offering the following description in his journal:

A kind of climbing plant called the supple Jack by our Sailors, on account of its pliancy, bears red berries, something similar to cherries, & runs up the highest trees, climbs over to another, & after having made its way over many of them, it often comes again down & strikes fresh roots.

In 1776, the Forsters published the genus Ripogonum in the second edition of their Characteres Generum Plantarum with Ripogonum scandens as the type species. The name Ripogonum is derived from the Greek words ῥιπος (rhipos, wickerwork, referring to the long shoots) and γονυ (gonu, jointed), from the jointed appearance of the stems.

Because the Greek word ῥιπος begins with an aspirate rho rather than plain rho, classical scholars preferred to transcribe it with rh- rather than r-. Consequently, some early botanists treated the Forsters' spelling as an error to be corrected and the spelling Rhipogonum was used. Which spelling is correct depends on the interpretation of Article 60 of the International Code of Nomenclature for algae, fungi, and plants, which recommends that the classical transcription rules should be followed when forming new names (Rec. 60A) and also that "the original spelling of a name or epithet is to be retained, except for the correction of typographical or orthographical errors".

It has been stated that the Forsters' spelling is probably deliberate and should not be liable to correction in the same way as an accidental typographical error would be. The International Plant Names Index treats the spelling Rhipogonum as an "orthographic variant", and the Index Nominum Genericorum database uses the spelling Ripogonum, as does the World Checklist of Selected Plant Families as of March 2014.

=== Phylogeny and classification ===
Until recently, Ripogonum was included in the family Smilacaceae (and earlier in the family Liliaceae along with other lilioid monocots) but it has now been separated into its own family Ripogonaceae. The family name was first formally defined by Conran and Clifford in 1985. Armen Takhtajan later created the same family without realising it already existed.

Molecular phylogenetic studies since the early 2000s have consistently shown a close relationship between the four families Ripogonaceae, Philesiaceae, Smilacaceae and the modern narrowly defined Liliaceae. This relationship was confirmed in a 2013 study, which produced the cladogram:

- - Liliaceae
  - - Smilacaceae
    - - Ripogonaceae
      - Philesiaceae

The authors suggested that the Ripogonaceae and Philesiaceae could be combined into a single family based both on the genetic similarity of their plastids and common morphological features. The APG III system treats them as two separate families in the Liliales, both distinct from Smilacaceae.

=== Species ===
Ripogonum contains six described species as of July 2013.

- Ripogonum album R.Br., White supplejack – Australia (Queensland, New South Wales and Victoria) & New Guinea
- Ripogonum brevifolium Conran & Clifford, Small-leaved supplejack – Australia (Queensland and New South Wales)
- Ripogonum discolor F.Muell., Prickly supplejack – Australia (Queensland and New South Wales)
- Ripogonum elseyanum F.Muell., Hairy supplejack – Australia (Queensland and New South Wales)
- Ripogonum fawcettianum F.Muell. ex Benth., Small supplejack – Australia (Queensland and New South Wales)
- Ripogonum scandens J.R.Forst. & G.Forst., Supplejack – the sole New Zealand species

== Uses ==
Some species of this genus are used for constructing baskets, ropes, and fish traps by indigenous peoples. In Australia and New Zealand, Ripogonum berries are known foods for some species of mammals and birds.

Ripogonum scandens has a fibrous root rich in starch and used as a beer flavouring. Known to the Māori of New Zealand as kareao or pirita, a concentrated decoction of the supplejack root has a sweetish sarsaparilla-like scent and flavour and is soothing to the throat. It was also used in treating bowel complaints, fever, rheumatism and skin diseases. The edible small berry is dry and insipid but the cooked young shoots reportedly taste like fresh green beans, and the sap is also edible.
