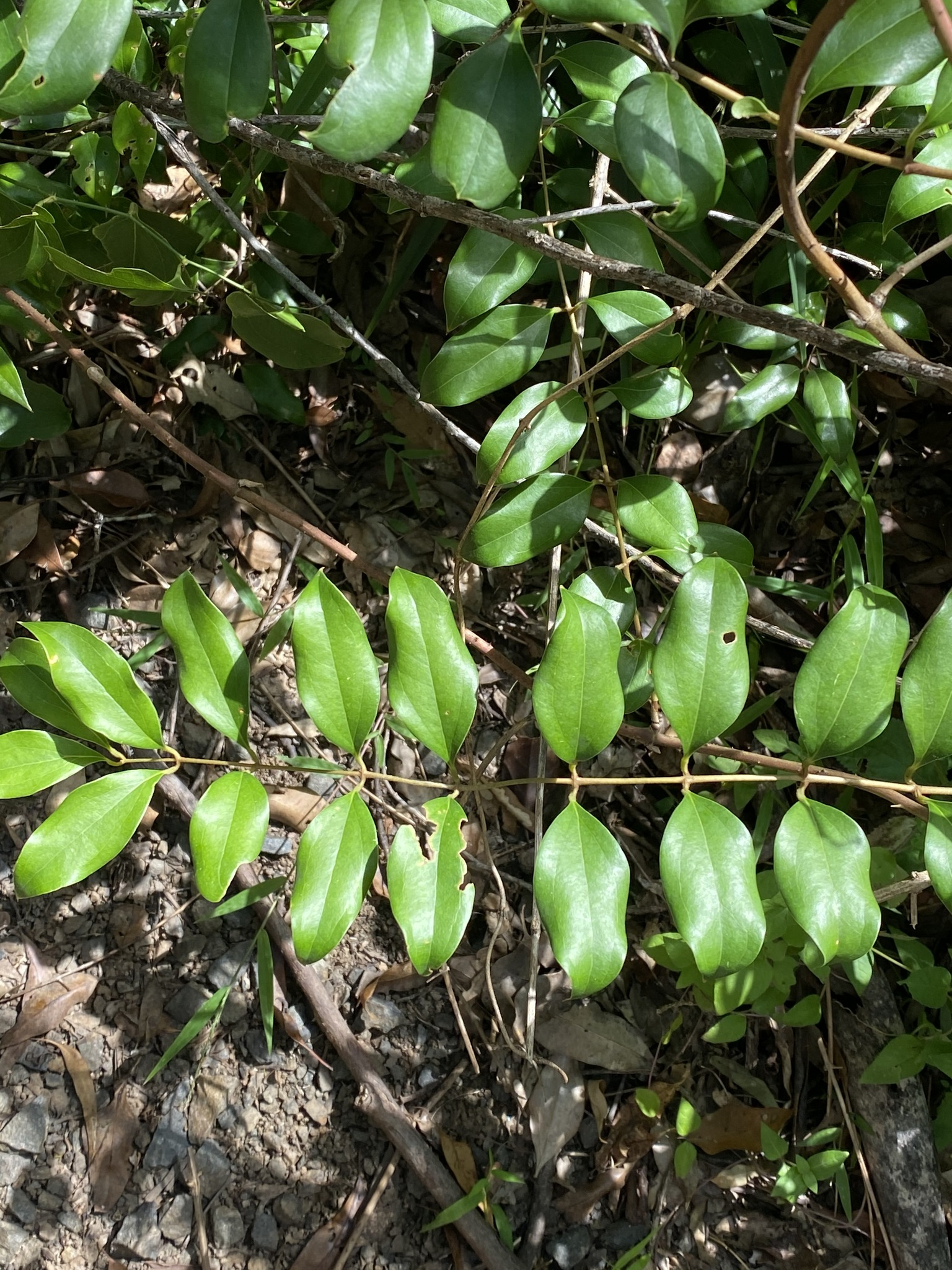

Scientific classification
- Kingdom: Plantae
- Clade: Tracheophytes
- Clade: Angiosperms
- Clade: Monocots
- Order: Liliales
- Family: Ripogonaceae
- Genus: Ripogonum
- Species: R. brevifolium

Binomial name
- Ripogonum brevifolium Conran & Clifford

= Ripogonum brevifolium =

Species of shrub

Ripogonum brevifolium, commonly known as small–leaved supplejack, is a vine, or sometimes a shrub, native to Australia.

The species occurs in the states of Queensland and New South Wales.
