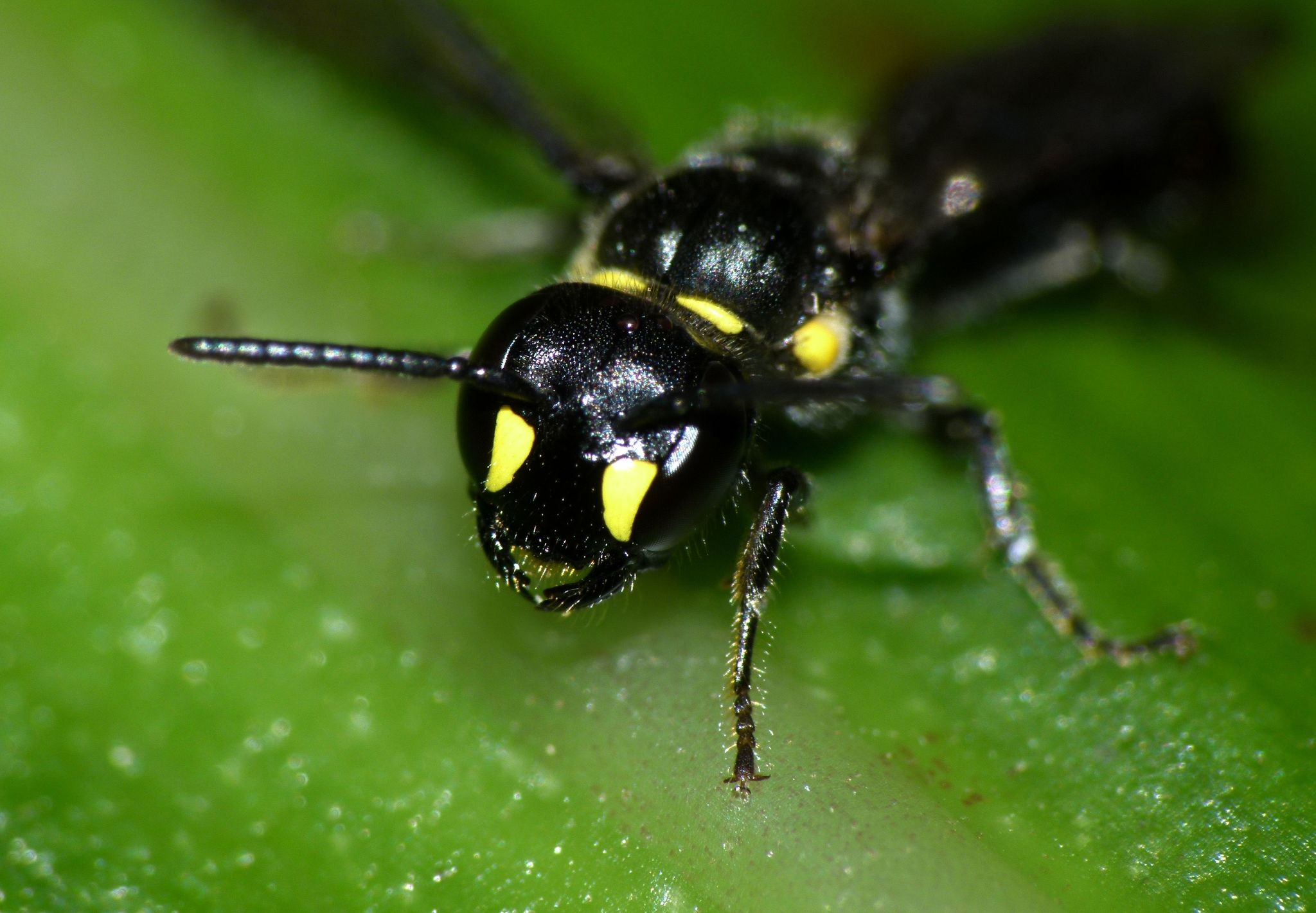
- Female

Scientific classification
- Kingdom: Animalia
- Phylum: Arthropoda
- Clade: Pancrustacea
- Class: Insecta
- Order: Hymenoptera
- Family: Colletidae
- Genus: Hylaeus
- Species: H. agilis

Binomial name
- Hylaeus agilis (Smith, 1876)

Synonyms
- Prosopis laevigata Smith, 1854 (preoccupied); Prosopis agilis Smith, 1876; Prosopis maorica Kirkaldy, 1909; Prosopis agilis laevigata Cockerell, 1916; Hylaeus (Prosopisteron) maorica Valentine & Walker, 1991; Hylaeus agilis (Smith, 1876)

= Hylaeus agilis =

Species of bee

Hylaeus agilis is a bee species in the family Colletidae. It is endemic to New Zealand. This species is found throughout the country and visits the flowers of a wide variety of plant species, both native and introduced.

== Taxonomy ==
This species was first described by Frederick Smith in 1876 under the name Prosopis agilis. The holotype specimen of this species is held at the Natural History Museum, London.

== Description ==
H. agilis are slender and mainly black in colour, with distinctive yellow or white markings on their face. They have sparse hairs and range in size from 7-9mm.

As found in all Hylaeus bees they lack pollen-carrying hairs (scopa), and resemble wasps.

=== Females ===
Females are between 6.0 and 8.8mm in length, and 1.5 to 2.0mm large. Forewings are between 4.3 and 6mm in length.

The entire body is black except for the paraocular areas (Note: paraocular area). These are yellow below an irregular line running from the opposite dorsal margin of the clypeus to an opposite point on the inner margin of the compound eye. Antennae are light brown on the ventral region to the pedicel; 1/3 to 2/5 of the outer pronotum is yellow. The pronotal lobe (Note: "pronotal lobe") is also yellow. The apex of both the mandibles and tarsal claws are dark red. Metatibial spurs (Note: "metatibial spurs") are pale, while the wing membranes are slightly darkened.

The scape is slightly longer than the length of flagellar segments 1–4; the distal antennal segments are the widest. The compound eyes are 4x longer than they are wide. Antennal sockets (Note: "antennal sockets") are 1.5x further from the apex of the clypeus than from the vertex. The frontal line extends to the median ocellus. The clypeus is characterised as flat and short; it extends for approximately 1/7th of its length below a line that runs across the lower margins of the compound eyes. The face below the antennal sockets is characterised as shiny, tessellated lightly and has small punctures that are separated by 4-8 diameters (except the lower margin of the clypeus and the supraclupeus (Note: supraclupeus)). The area above the antennal sockets is dull with moderate tessellation. Medium-sized punctures are separated by 0.5-1 diameters in this upper region. The galea (Note: "galea") is lightly tessellated.

The pronotum has irregular striae on lateral areas which are angled down and back by approximately 30° and are slightly tessellated. The scutum is moderately tessellated with medium-sized punctures. The scutellum is impunctate and shows light tessellation. The propodeal triangle is evenly rounded; the anterior margin is broad with light roughening, while the lateral areas of the propodeum are lightly shagreened with medium-sized punctures. The metepisternum is light shagreened with fine longitudinal striae. The inner metatibial spurs (Note: "metatibial spurs") are very finely ciliate.

Metasomal terga 1-5 and sterna 1-6 are lightly shagreened and shiny. The terga show extremely small and wide-spaced punctures while the sterna have medium-sized punctures. Metasomal terga 2 and 3 have post-spiracular glands, while tergum 2 has a small fovea (depression or pit) above and behind a post-spiracular gland. Sternum 1 has an apical longitudinal medium slit extending less than half of the sternum.

=== Males ===
Males are between 4.6 and 7mm in length, and between 1 and 1.3mm in width. They have a forewing length between 3.1 and 4.6mm.

Males have similar colouring to females. They are predominantly black with the same yellow marking in the paraocular area and clypeus. They have a yellow labrum. Mandibles are yellow except at the base, where they are narrow, black and dark red at their apex. Antennae and pronotal (Note: UCR glossary) are once again similar to females however the angle of the pronotum usually has some yellowing. The anterior face of the protibia (Note: "protibia") and probasitarsus (Note: "probasitarsus") is light yellow. There is slightly yellowing at the apex of the profemur, (Note: "profemur") as well as on the articulations between the mesofemur, (Note: "mesofemur") mesotibia (Note: "mesotibia") and apex of the mesotibia.

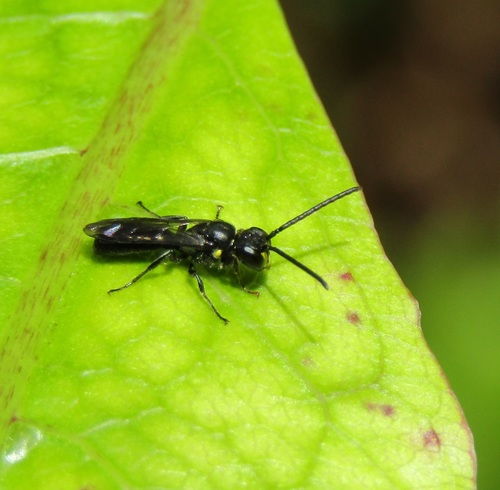
A male Agile Masked Bee (Hylaeus agilis) observed in Wellington, New Zealand.

Males have a short scape that is approximately equal in length to the combined length of the first two flagellar segments. The first flagellar segment is slightly longer than it is wider, while the remaining segments are nearly twice as long as wide. The compound eyes are approximately 3x longer than they are wide; inner margins are similar to those found in females. The supraclypeus (Note: "supraclypeus") rises from below to a small rounded point found between the antennal sockets (Note: "antennal sockets") . The facial fovea is barely discernable, a short linear depression near the upper inner margin of the compound eye. The clyepus is slightly rounded in cross-section, short, and extends for approximately 1/9th of its length below a line found across the lower margins of the compound eyes. The malar space is lightly shagreened, and is 14 times wider than long. The galea is smooth and shiny. The rest of the head is similar to that found in females, however the face above the antennae shows dense tessellation.

The mesosoma is similar to that found in females, however the propodeal triangle is slightly angled as opposed to rounded. Metasomal terga 1-5 and sterna 1-5 are close to those found in females, except show more pronounced punctuation. The post-spiracular glands are not obvious on terga 2 and 3. Metasomal terga 2 and 3 have small fovea, which is smaller on tergum 3. Sternum 7 has long and narrow basal processes. The anterior apical lobes acute anteriorly and have a lateral fringe of short hairs, while posterior apical lobes are produced laterally with a patch of short hairs. The basal process on sternum 8 is short, while the apical process is simple and rounded. Gonocoxae are angled laterally in the dorsal and ventral views. Gonostyli are short, blunt and stout with hairs from the inner, apical and lateral faces. Penis valves are stout, blunted apically and projected beyond the end of the gonostyli; in the lateral view, they project well below the gonostyle and are apically very acute.

=== Variations ===
Females from Manawatāwhi / Three Kings Islands have presented with paracoluar maculae that are very faint.

The area of the clypeus that is yellow in males can vary from occupying nearly the entire clypeus region to occupying less than the ventral half.

The pronotal angle of males can range from black to the yellow found typically in females.

== Distribution ==
H. agilis is endemic to New Zealand and found on the North, South and Stewart Islands as well as on Three Kings Island. H. agilis is predominantly located in vegetated areas from sea level to 1590m of elevation.

H. agilis is less frequent in areas of dense vegetation such as forest interiors, and instead becomes more abundant in more exposed areas. Edge habitat is preferred by these species.

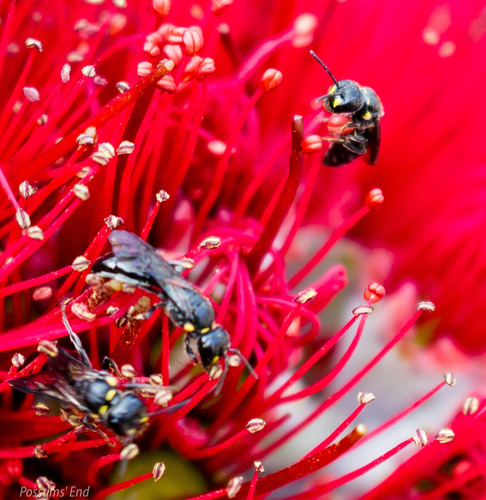
Three female Agile masked bees (Hylaeus agilis) foraging in Dunedin, New Zealand.

This species was recorded on the Chatham Islands in 1903. Whether or not it is present is uncertain, as this finding has not been supported by additional records or specimens.

== Behaviour ==
The female adults of this species are on the wing from October to May while the adult males of the species have been observed from October to April.

H. agilis pollinate red mistletoe (Peraxilla tetrapetala), an endangered mistletoe species endemic to New Zealand. This mistletoe species is explosive, meaning that requires forceful opening and was previously thought to only attract endemic birds evolved to twist the flowers open. However, H. agilis was observed continuously gnawing on unopened buds until they opened. Thus H. agilis is ecologically important for native New Zealand plants.

Because H. agilis has no specialised pollen-carrying structures on its body, pollen is carried in a crop. This internal pollen is regurgitated for larval food. Like most bee species endemic to New Zealand, they are solitary mining bees but instead of constructing or excavating their own nests, they live in blind tunnels in branches and twigs, or in abandoned beetle holes in logs.

=== Nesting biology ===
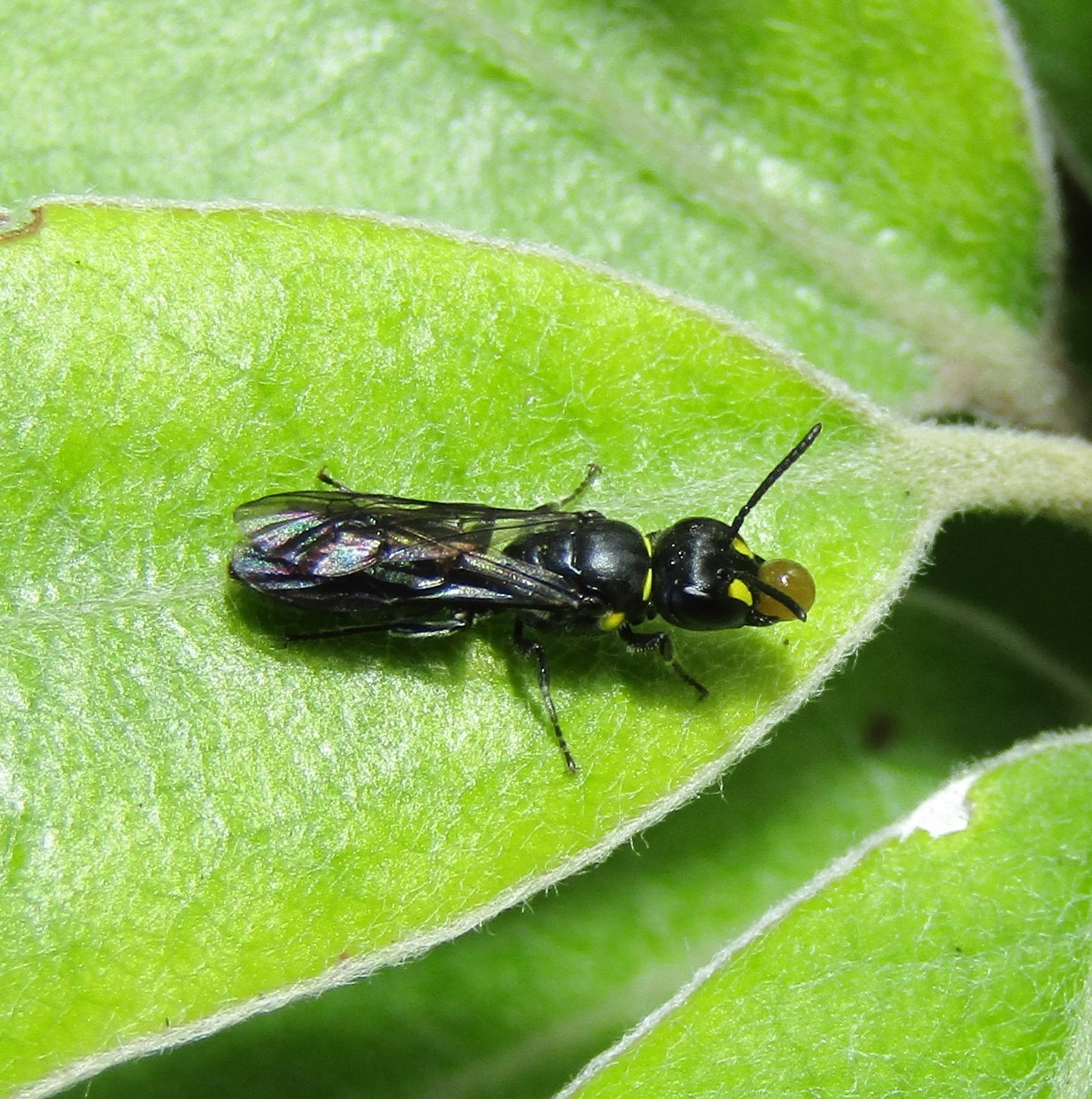
H. agilis regurgitating pollen

H. agilis is known to nest in holes and tunnels made in wood by other invertebrates. These holes are then lined with cellophane-liked material, and cells are created inside. The cellophane-like material adheres to the hole, and so the shape of nests mimics the cavity that they are made in. Sometimes, the bees appear to double-layer this wall material.

While it is likely that they will nest in any available cavities, H. agilis has been recorded nesting in the following: Muhlenbeckia australis, Ripogonum scandens, Veronica stricta, Brachyglottis reinoldii, Prumnopitys ferruginea and Rubus fruticosus.

=== Feeding ecology ===
Female H. agilis can aggressively seek out both pollen and nectar.

This species has been observed visiting Alepis flavida (yellow mistletoe), prying open the tips of buds and pushing down inside the tubes. They also push inside the shorter tubes of open flowers.

H. agilis are also known to open Peraxilla tetrapetala (red mistletoe) flowers in order to feed from them, which has been recorded as improving fruitset.

== Host species ==
This bee species has a wide variety of both native and introduced host species. Native species include Olearia angustifolia, Carmichaelia species, Peraxilla tetrapetala, Leptospermum scoparium, Metrosideros excelsa, Metrosideros robusta and Veronica salicifolia.
