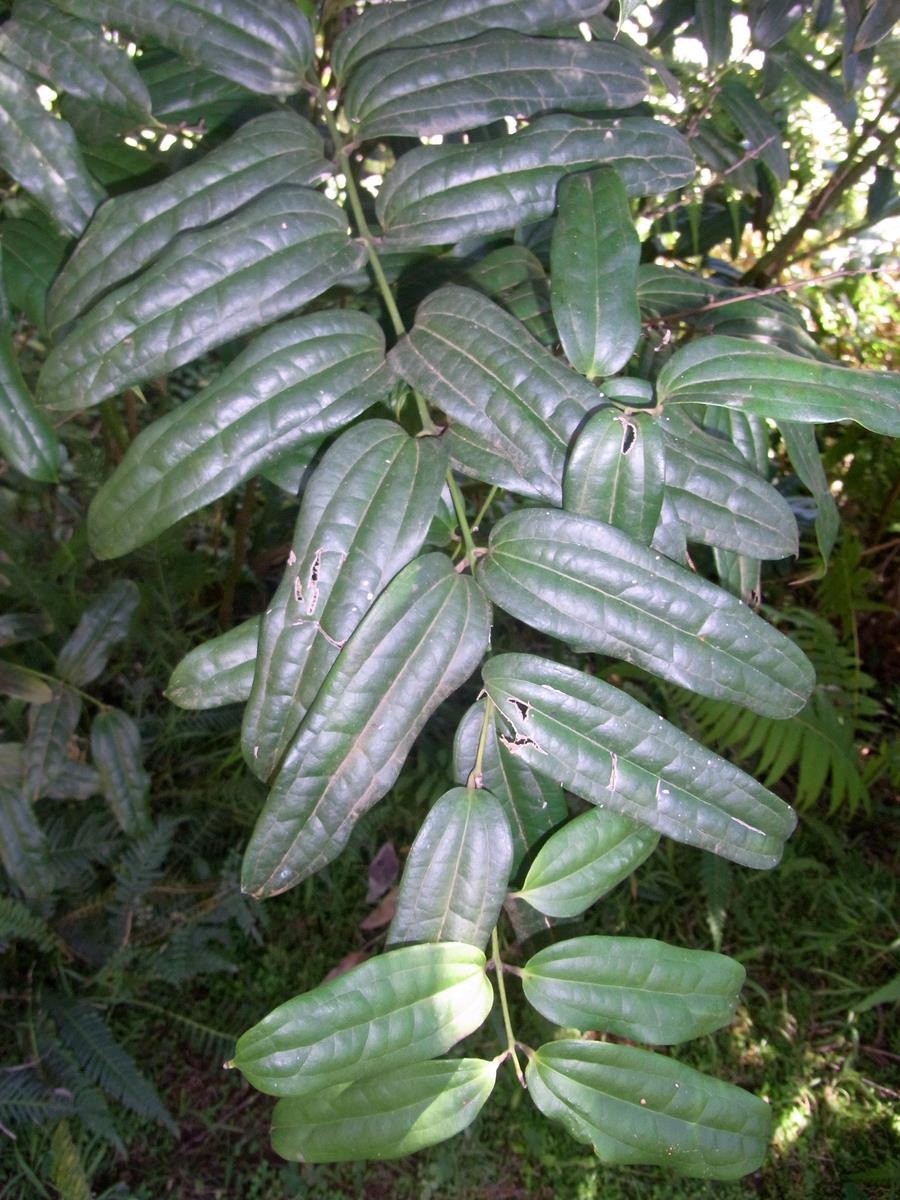

Scientific classification
- Kingdom: Plantae
- Clade: Tracheophytes
- Clade: Angiosperms
- Clade: Monocots
- Order: Liliales
- Family: Ripogonaceae
- Genus: Ripogonum
- Species: R. discolor

Binomial name
- Ripogonum discolor F.Muell.

= Ripogonum discolor =

Prickly supplejack

Species of flowering plant

Ripogonum discolor, known as the prickly supplejack, is a common rainforest vine, found in eastern Australia. The original specimen was collected at the Clarence River.

The species occurs in the states of Queensland and New South Wales.
