= Joseph Ravenscroft Elsey =

English-born naturalist, surgeon, and explorer

Joseph Ravenscroft Elsey (1834–1857) was an English born naturalist, surgeon and explorer. After achieving qualifications in Chemistry and at the Royal College of Surgeons, Elsey joined the North Australian Exploring Expedition, led by Augustus Gregory, that was under taken in 1856. His notes on three novel specimens of birds were published by John Gould, and commemorated in the naming of a plant species, Ripogonum elseyanum, by Ferdinand von Mueller. The description by John Edward Gray of a new genus of turtles, Elseya, also honours Elsey's contributions as a field worker collecting records of Australian flora and fauna.
