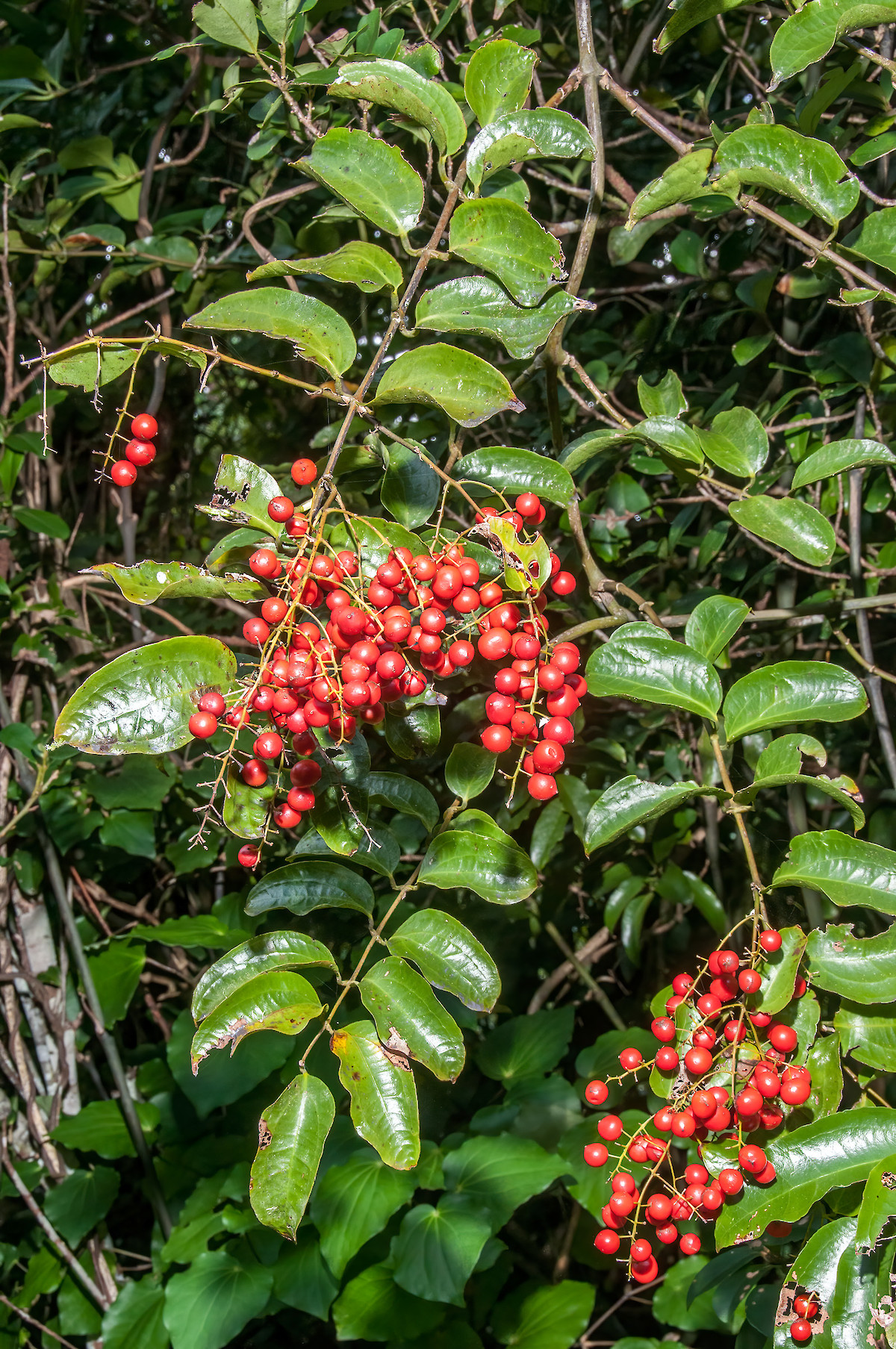
- Foliage and fruits of R. scandens

Conservation status
- Not Threatened (NZ TCS)

Scientific classification
- Kingdom: Plantae
- Clade: Tracheophytes
- Clade: Angiosperms
- Clade: Monocots
- Order: Liliales
- Family: Ripogonaceae
- Genus: Ripogonum
- Species: R. scandens

Binomial name
- Ripogonum scandens J.R.Forst. & G.Forst.

= Ripogonum scandens =

Species of flowering plant

Ripogonum scandens, commonly known as supplejack and kareao, is a species of climbing forest vine in the family Ripogonaceae. It is endemic to New Zealand. Its range mainly covers the North and South Islands but it also occurs on some offshore islands. Red globe-shaped fruits, which hang from the oppositely arranged leaves, are eaten and dispersed by birds. These fruits are edible, and so are the newly formed shoots at the end of the vines.

The species was first described by Johann Reinhold Forster and Georg Forster in 1776. The genus Ripogonum (alternatively spelled Rhipogonum), was originally considered to be part of the family Smilacaceae or Liliaceae, but in 1985 was reclassified as the sole genus in the family Ripogonaceae. R. scandens was valued by Māori and European settlers, primarily for the stems that were valued for their length, strength, and flexibility. In 2023, the conservation status was assessed as "Not Threatened" in the New Zealand Threat Classification System.

== Description ==
Ripogonum scandens (supplejack) is an evergreen climbing forest vine (liane), reaching lengths of up to 18 metres (60 feet) long. The rhizomes are stout, woody, and 30–60 mm (1.2–2.4 in) in diameter. The stems can be several metres long, about 15–20 mm (0.59–0.79 in) in diameter, seldomly branched, almost black in colour, with nodes about 100–200 mm (3.9–7.9 in) apart. Leaves are mostly arranged opposite to each other, usually 55–160 × 20–60 mm long, variably green in colour, coriaceous (leather-like) in character, narrow-ovate to oblong in shape.

Flowering typically occurs in December and January. The petioles are about 10–15 m (33–49 ft) long. The inflorescences (flower clusters) are 100–150 mm (3.9–5.9 in) long. Its pedicels are about 5–9 mm (0.20–0.35 in) long. Its spreading tepals are green in colour. Its filamentous stamens are about 2 mm (0.079 in) long. Its anthers are greenish to yellow in colour, linear-oblong in character, and about 3.0–5.0 × 1.0–1.5 mm long. Its ovaries are globe-shaped, about 1.5 mm (0.059 in) in diameter. Fruiting typically occurs from March onwards. Fruits are also globe-shaped, bright red in colour, 10–15 mm (0.39–0.59 in) in diameter; the pericarps are thin and fleshy. R. scandens has a diploid chromosome count of 22.

== Gallery ==
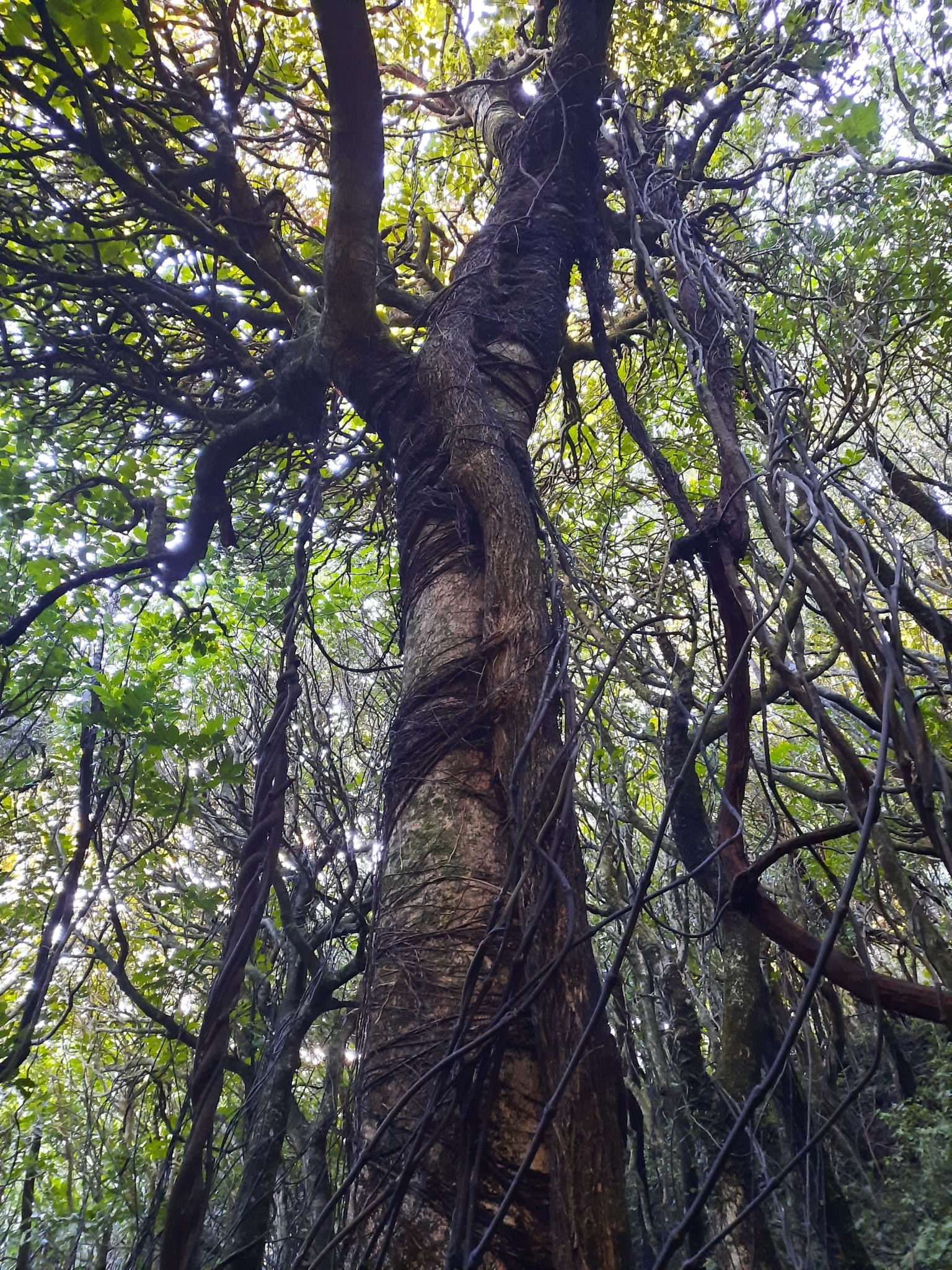
R. scandens climbing up a tree

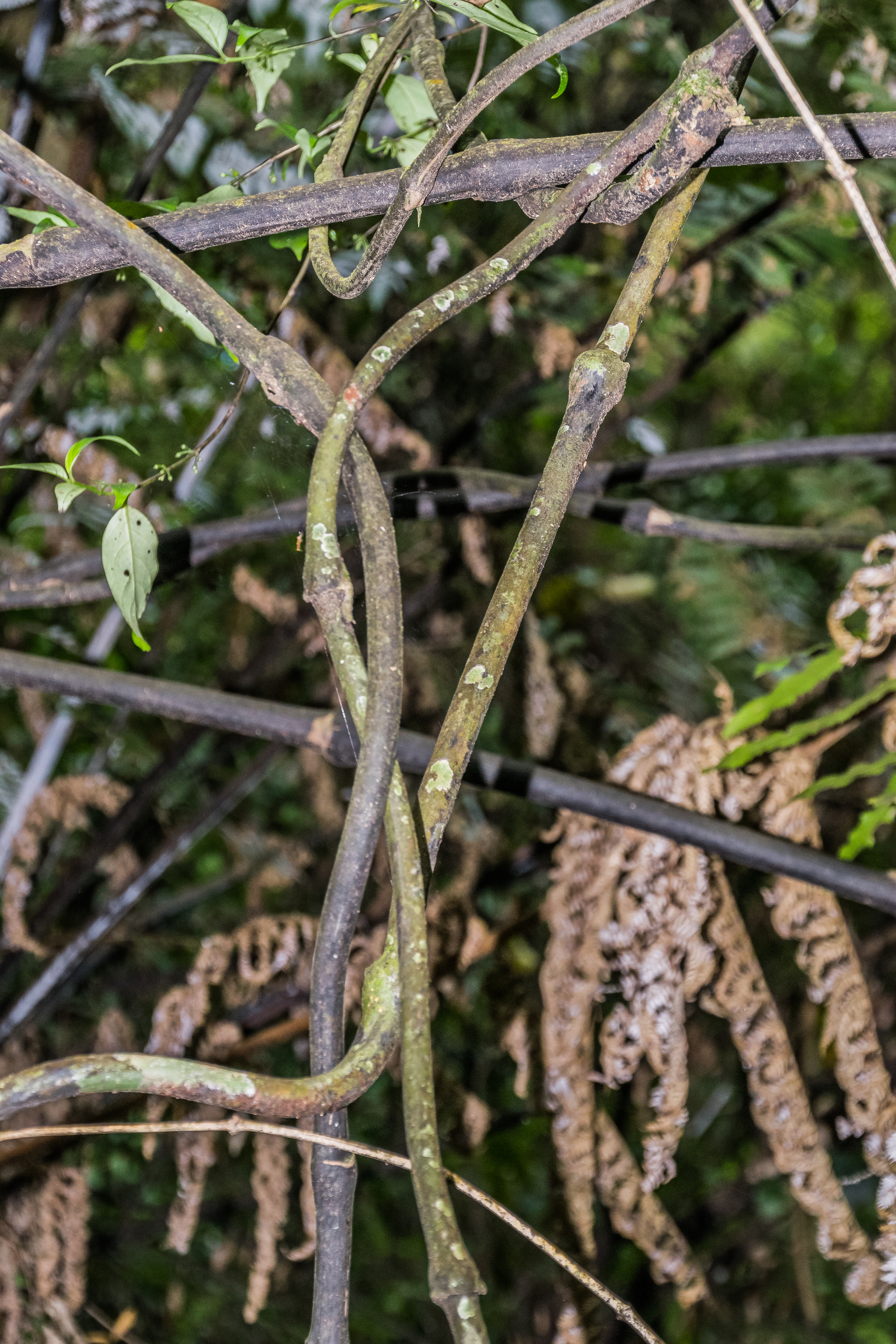
Woody brown vines of R. scandens

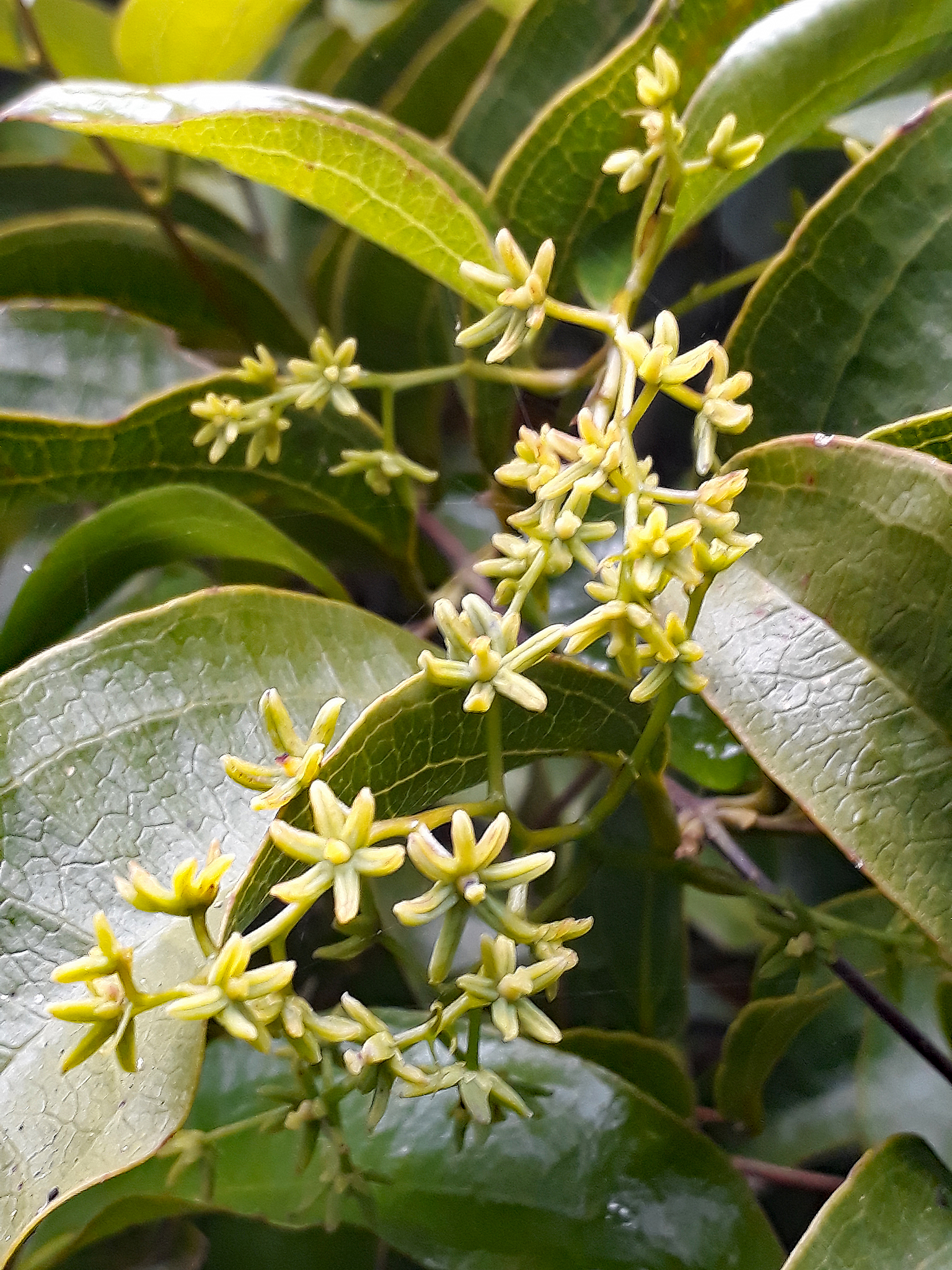
Flowering inflorescence (flower cluster)

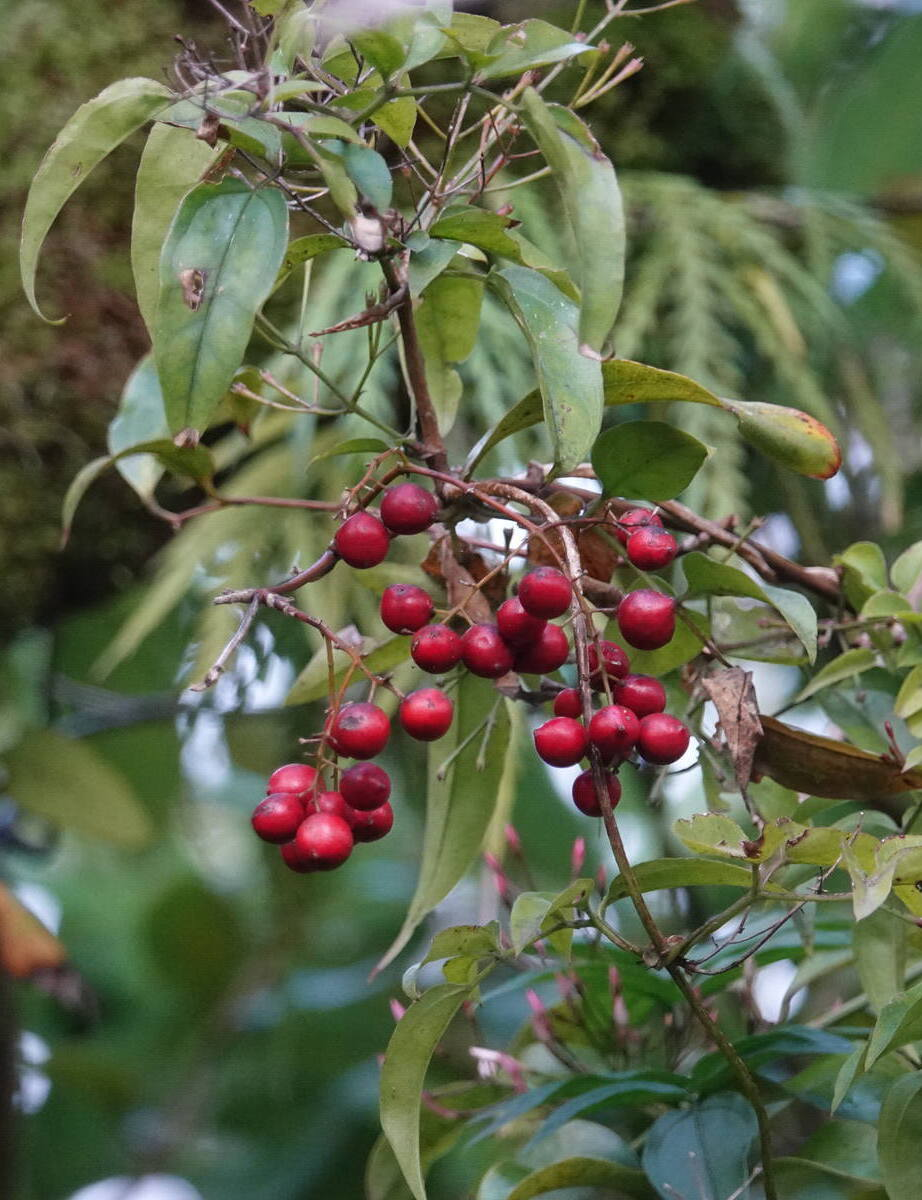
Fruiting specimen

== Taxonomy ==
=== Classification ===
Ripogonum scandens is a species of plant in family Ripogonaceae. Ripogonum scandens is the sole member of the genus Ripogonum in New Zealand, with several members of the genus found in Australia and New Guinea. The taxonomic placement of the species is debatable, and has been formerly placed in the family Smilacaceae or Liliaceae. In 1985, a study established the family Ripogonaceae and placed the sole genus Ripogonum in it. The glabrous foliage and other characteristics of the plant, are comparable to those of R. danesii and R. papuanum, found in Australia and New Guinea, respectively. Fossil leaves of Ripogonum from the Manuherikia Group are indistinguishable from the extant species, R. scandens. Fossil leaves of Ripogonum have been discovered in Patagonia, Argentina.

In 1776, the species and the genus Ripogonum was first described by the German naturalists Johann Reinhold Forster and Georg Forster in the second edition of their Characteres Generum Plantarum with Ripogonum scandens designated as the type species.

=== Etymology ===
The etymology of R. scandens's genus name, Ripogonum (alternatively spelled Rhipogonum), is unclear. One possibility is that it might come from the Greek rhipos, meaning 'wickerwork', and gonu meaning 'jointed', in reference to the cane-like stems. Another possibility suggests that the genus name could mean "osier with knees". The specific epithet (second part of the scientific name), scandens, meaning 'climbing', in reference to the climbing habit of the species. The common English language name supplejack is used to describe tough, woody climbing plants, and is a name used for numerous unrelated plants. The Māori language name kareao is of uncertain etymology, but the name pirita has cognates in other Polynesian languages, typically 'pilita', which is a word used to describe the wild yam (Dioscorea pentaphylla).

Ripogonum scandens was one of the first native plants to receive a common name from Europeans, known as 'supplejack', which was first coined in 1773 during Cook's second voyage to New Zealand. The etymology of the word is uncertain, but it is possible that a member of his crew named it 'supplejack', a 'jack' being a sailor. The roots of the plant had some medicinal purposes to settlers, and the plant was sometimes termed 'bush sarsaparilla'.

== Ecology ==
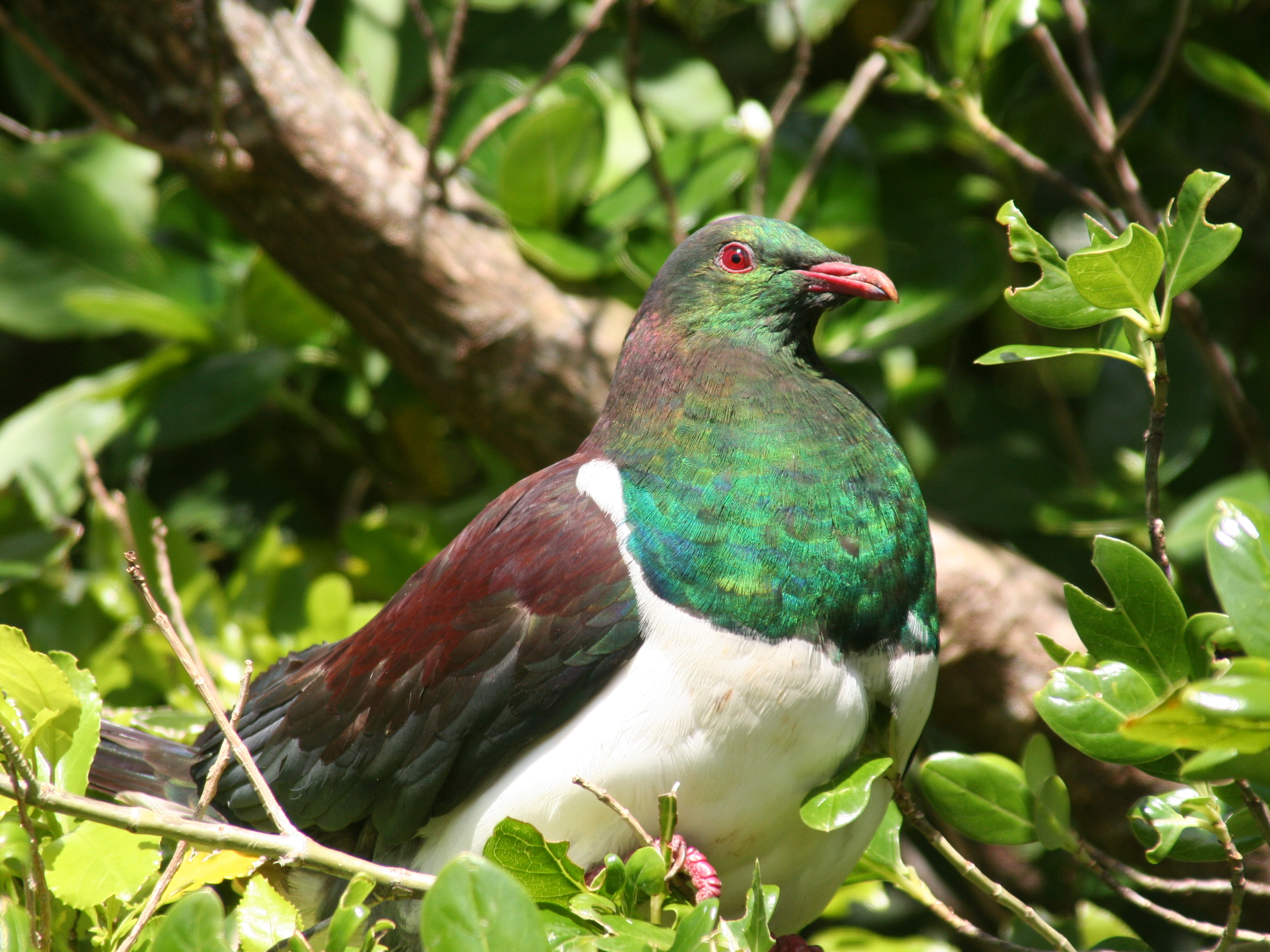
The fruits and leaves are eaten by kererū

Ripogonum scandens's fruits are dispersed by fruit-eating animals (frugivores), including numerous bird species. The kererū (Hemiphaga novaeseelandiae) and blackbirds (Turdus merula) are two bird species that consume fruits of R. scandens. The fruits are also eaten by the tūī (Prosthemadera novaeseelandiae), and are one of the main winter food sources for the North Island kōkako (Callaeas wilsoni). In addition to the fruits, kererū are also known to feed on adult leaves. R. scandens is pollinated by either insects or the wind. MacMillan (1972) noted that some flowers have underdeveloped ovaries, which allows self-pollination.

Ripogonum scandens plays host to at least two species of aphids from the genus Aulacorthum. Several moths have been identified as hosts on R. scandens, including Ctenopseustis obliquana, a common species in New Zealand, the larvae eat the stems, leaves, flowers and fruits. Epalxiphora axenana's larvae feed under the cataphylls and chew the tissue and stem. Oemona hirta is also hosted on R. scandens. The fruits of R. scandens, and other parts of the plant, are eaten by cattle, deer, feral pigs, possums, and rats.

A plant pathogen, Peniophora sacrata, is hosted on R. scandens. New Zealand mycologist G. H. Cunningham, recorded several fungi species of Thelephoraceae and two species of Polyporaceae that are saprophytic on dead stems of the species. Other fungi species and genera include, Acrogenotheca elegans, Septobasidium and Wallrothiella. Research by MacMillan (1972) suggests that in December and January, R. scandens's tips can grow an average of 5 cm (2.0 in) a day.

== Distribution ==
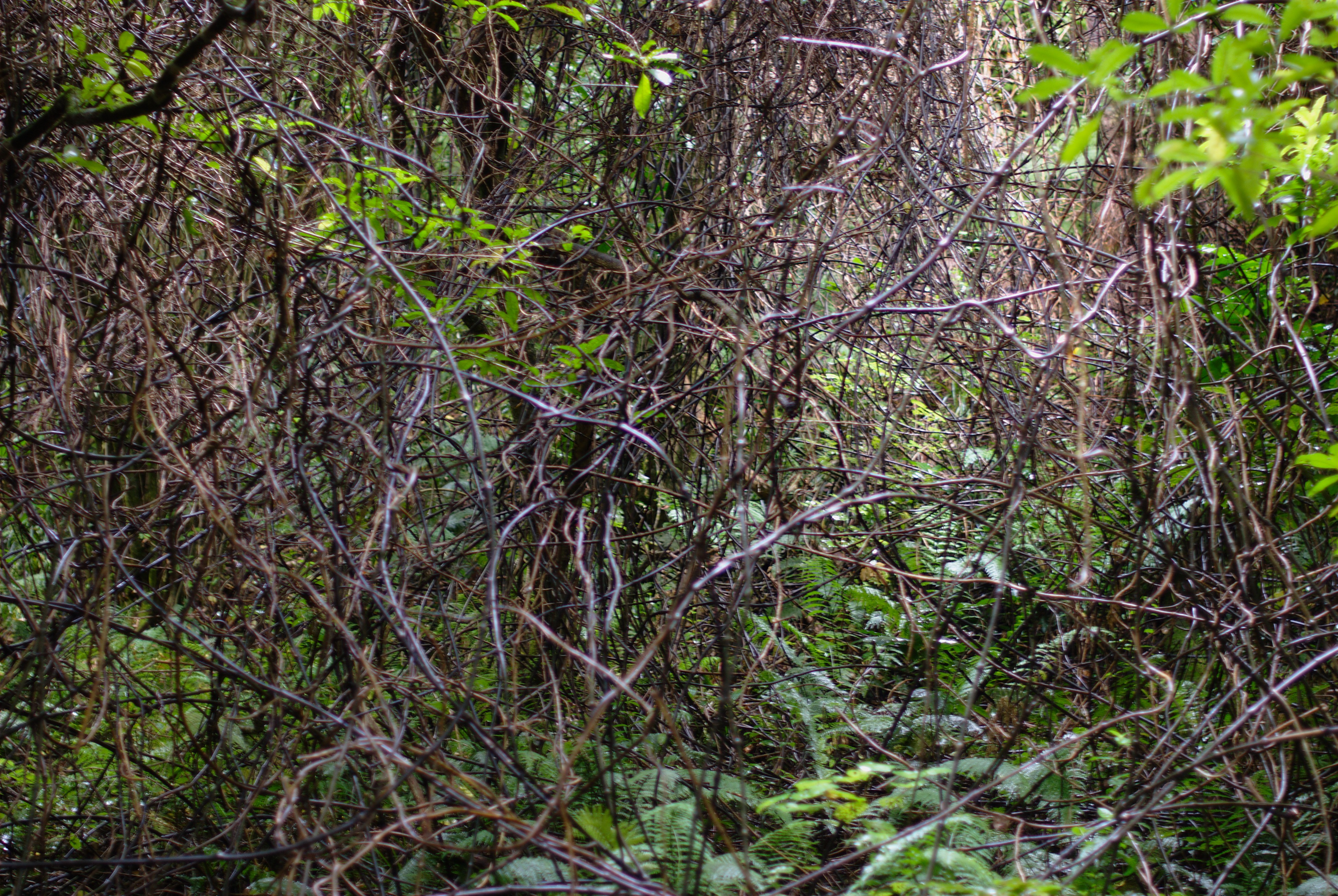
Ripogonum scandens will often form dense thickets in forested areas

Ripogonum scandens is endemic to New Zealand. Its range mainly covers the North and South Islands. It also occurs on the offshore Stewart and Chatham Islands. R. scandens generally occurs throughout the North Island. In the South Island, R. scandens's range mainly covers the western coast of the island, with several scattered distribution areas on the eastern coast of the island. Throughout Marlborough, Canterbury and Otago, the occurrence of R. scandens is sparingly found in relics of old-growth forests and is mainly found on peninsulas such as Kaikōura, Banks, and Otago. Other inland populations near Winton and Geraldine have reports of R. scandens being present. The plant is very common on Stewart Island. R. scandens's conservation status was assessed in 2023 in the New Zealand Threat Classification System as "Not Threatened".

=== Habitat ===
Ripogonum scandens is typically found in coastal to montane forests. R. scandens tends to be most common in forests that are dominated by hardwoods and podocarps. It is commonly associated with southern beech (Nothofagus) in Fiordland. R. scandens's maximum altitudinal ranges have been recorded as 900 m (3,000 ft) and 570 m (1,870 ft) in the North and South Islands, respectively. R. scandens is found on a wide range of soil types such as loam, pumice, and alluvial soils. The plant is also known the plant is able to withstand swampy forest conditions, where the soil can be occasionally flooded. R. scandens grows in both sunny and shady areas.

== Uses ==
=== In Māori culture ===
In many parts of the woods [sic] are so over-run with supplejacks, that it is scarcely possible to force one's way amongst them. I have seen several which were fifty or sixty fathoms long.

— James Cook, 1773

Ripogonum scandens is present in Māori mythology, in which, the vines are considered to be the tail of the god of eels, Tunaroa. The origin of this came from revenge for disrespecting the demigod Māui's wife. Therefore, Māui ambushed Tunaroa and killed him. Tunaroa's blood coloured birds and plants red, his body became many eel and fish species, and the tip of his tail became R. scandens, which could be used by people to create traps for eels. Other Māori traditions describe R. scandens as a plant created by Patupaiarehe, supernatural beings, as a defence for their forest homes. R. scandens's use in construction was also valued by Māori people for house-building and waka (canoe) construction. The vines are also a traditional building material to create traps for crayfish, eels, kōkopu and kiore.

Ripogonum scandens has also had some medicinal uses for Māori people, such as the roots being used to treat multiple diseases. There are also records of decoctions that were made to procure abortions. The fruits are edible, although most of the fruit consists of seed, the fruits have been described as "quite tasteless" by New Zealand botanist and horticulturalist Lawrie Metcalf. The young shoots are also an important food source, they have been nicknamed 'bush asparagus' in English, and they taste like green beans.

=== In European culture ===
Ripogonum scandens was valued by Māori and European settlers, primarily for its stems which were valued for their length, strength, and flexibility. The greatest value of R. scandens was perhaps its use in construction; the woody stems have proven to be useful in the making of baskets, binding together fences, canes, canoes, eel traps, fenders, houses, huts, ladders, rafts, sheep hurdles, walking sticks, and so forth.

Early European settlers also noted the intertwining characteristic of R. scandens, including the British explorer James Cook, who observed the plant while anchored in Dusky Sound. The intertwining characteristic is considered by many authors to be an inconvenience for movement in forests. The tangling characteristic of the vines has also been used to assist people descending cliff faces, which has been experimented with by the explorers Thomas Brunner and Charles Heaphy.

== Works cited ==
Books

- Cheeseman, T. F. (1906). Manual of the New Zealand flora (1 ed.). Wellington, New Zealand: Government of New Zealand.
- Laing, R. M. (1906). Plants of New Zealand. Christchurch, New Zealand: Whitcombe and Tombs – via the Internet Archive.
- Metcalf, Lawrie (2009). Know Your New Zealand Native Plants. Auckland, New Zealand: White Cloud Books. ISBN 978-1-77694-036-3.
- Vennell, Robert (2019). The Meaning of Trees. Auckland, New Zealand: HarperCollins. ISBN 978-1-77554-130-1.

Journals

- Burrows, C. J. (1996). "Germination behaviour of the seeds of seven New Zealand vine species". New Zealand Journal of Botany. 34 (1): 93–102. doi:10.1080/0028825X.1996.10412696. ISSN 0028-825X.
- Carpenter, Rj; Wilf, P; Conran, Jg; Cúneo, Nr (2014). "A Paleogene Trans-Antarctic Distribution for Ripogonum (Ripogonaceae: Liliales)?". Palaeontologia Electronica. doi:10.26879/460. ISSN 1094-8074.
- Conran, J. G.; Clifford, H. T. (1985). "The taxonomic affinities of the genus Ripogonum". Nordic Journal of Botany. 5 (3): 215–219. doi:10.1111/j.1756-1051.1985.tb01650.x. ISSN 0107-055X.
- Kelly, D.; Robertson, A. W.; Ladley, J. J.; Anderson, S. H.; McKenzie, R. J. (2006). "Relative (Un)Importance of Introduced Animals as Pollinators and Dispersers of Native Plants". Biological Invasions in New Zealand. Vol. 186. Springer-Verlag. doi:10.1007/3-540-30023-6_15. ISBN 978-3-540-30022-9.
- MacMillan, B. H. (1972). "Biological flora of New Zealand 7. Ripogonum scandens J. R. et G. Forst. (Smilacaceae) Supplejack, Kareao". New Zealand Journal of Botany. 10 (4): 641–672. doi:10.1080/0028825X.1972.10430252. ISSN 0028-825X.
- Pole, Mike (1993). "Early Miocene flora of the Manuherikia Group, New Zealand. 5. Smilacaceae, Polygonaceae, Elaeocarpaceae". Journal of the Royal Society of New Zealand. 23 (4): 289–302. doi:10.1080/03036758.1993.10721227. ISSN 0303-6758.
- Seberg, Ole; Petersen, Gitte; Wagner, Peter (2013). "To aitch or not to aitch: Ripogonum (Ripogonaceae) or Rhipogonum (Rhipogonaceae)?". Taxon. 62 (3): 606–608. doi:10.12705/623.7. ISSN 0040-0262.
- Sopow, Stephanie L.; Bain, John (2017). "A checklist of New Zealand Cerambycidae (Insecta: Coleoptera), excluding Lamiinae". New Zealand Entomologist. 40 (2): 55–71. Bibcode:2017NZEnt..40...55S. doi:10.1080/00779962.2017.1357423. ISSN 0077-9962.
- St Paul, J. W. (1966). "Notes on Foods of the North Island Kokako at Moumoukai". Notornis. 13: 99–100. doi:10.63172/827806ppaqxl.
- Thomson, C.; Challies, C.N. (1988). "Diet of Feral Pigs in the Podocarp-Tawa Forests of the Urewera Ranges". New Zealand Journal of Ecology. 11. New Zealand Ecological Society: 73–78. ISSN 0110-6465. JSTOR 24052819.

Websites

- De Lange, Peter (2025). "Ripogonum scandens". New Zealand Plant Conservation Network. Archived from the original on 4 August 2025.
- "Ripogonum scandens J.R.Forst. & G.Forst., Char. Gen. Pl., ed. 2. 50, t. 25 (1776)". The Royal Botanic Gardens, Kew, Harvard University Herbaria & Libraries and Australian National Herbarium. International Plant Names Index. 2025. Archived from the original on 24 December 2024.
