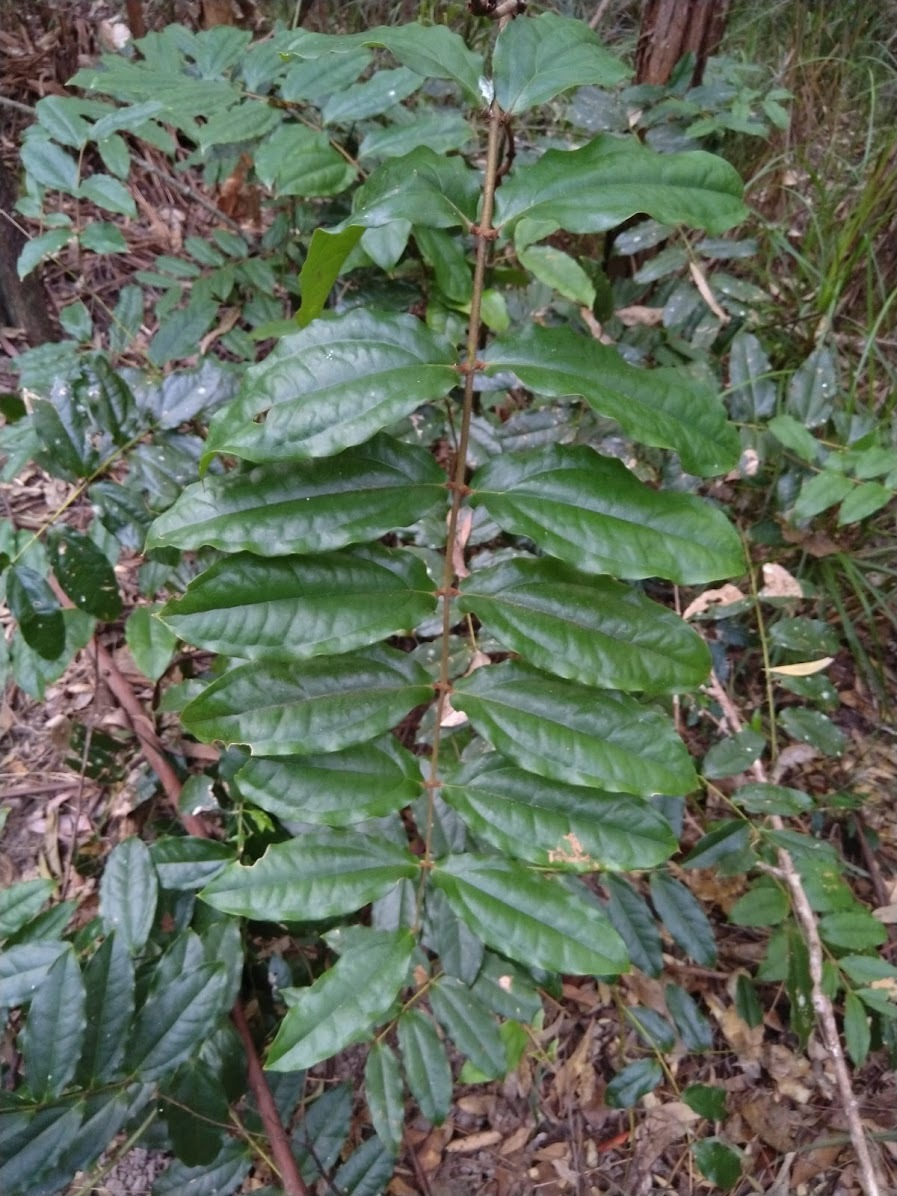

Scientific classification
- Kingdom: Plantae
- Clade: Tracheophytes
- Clade: Angiosperms
- Clade: Monocots
- Order: Liliales
- Family: Ripogonaceae
- Genus: Ripogonum
- Species: R. elseyanum

Binomial name
- Ripogonum elseyanum F.Muell.

= Ripogonum elseyanum =

Species of shrub

Ripogonum elseyanum, commonly known as hairy supplejack, is a climbing vine, or sometimes a shrub, native to coastal rainforests of New South Wales and Queensland, Australia.

The species was named by Mueller to honour the surgeon and naturalist, Joseph Ravenscroft Elsey (1834–1857), who was with Mueller on the 1856 expedition led by Augustus Gregory.
