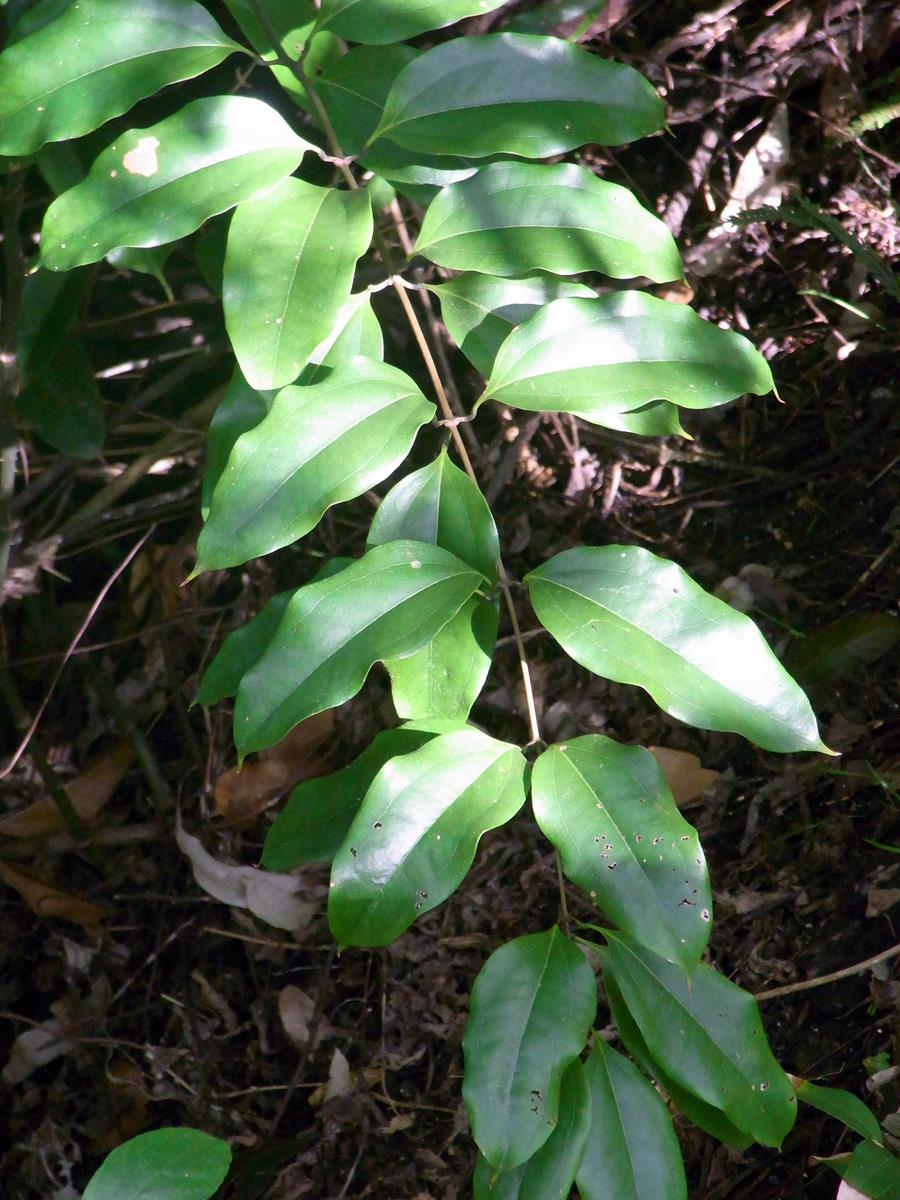
- Eastwood, NSW, Australia

Scientific classification
- Kingdom: Plantae
- Clade: Tracheophytes
- Clade: Angiosperms
- Clade: Monocots
- Order: Liliales
- Family: Ripogonaceae
- Genus: Ripogonum
- Species: R. album

Binomial name
- Ripogonum album R.Br.

= Ripogonum album =

White supplejack

Species of flowering plant

Ripogonum album, known as the white supplejack, is a common rainforest vine, found in eastern Australia. The leaves are identified by the longitudinal venation. A stout climber, with stems up to 15 metres long. Flowers are greenish white, and the fruit is a round red berry. Indigenous Australians used the stems for making traps for catching crayfish.

The specific epithet album is from the Latin, referring to the white flowers. This species first appeared in scientific literature in 1810 in the Prodromus Florae Novae Hollandiae. Authored by the prolific Scottish botanist, Robert Brown.

The species occurs in the states of Queensland, New South Wales and Victoria.
