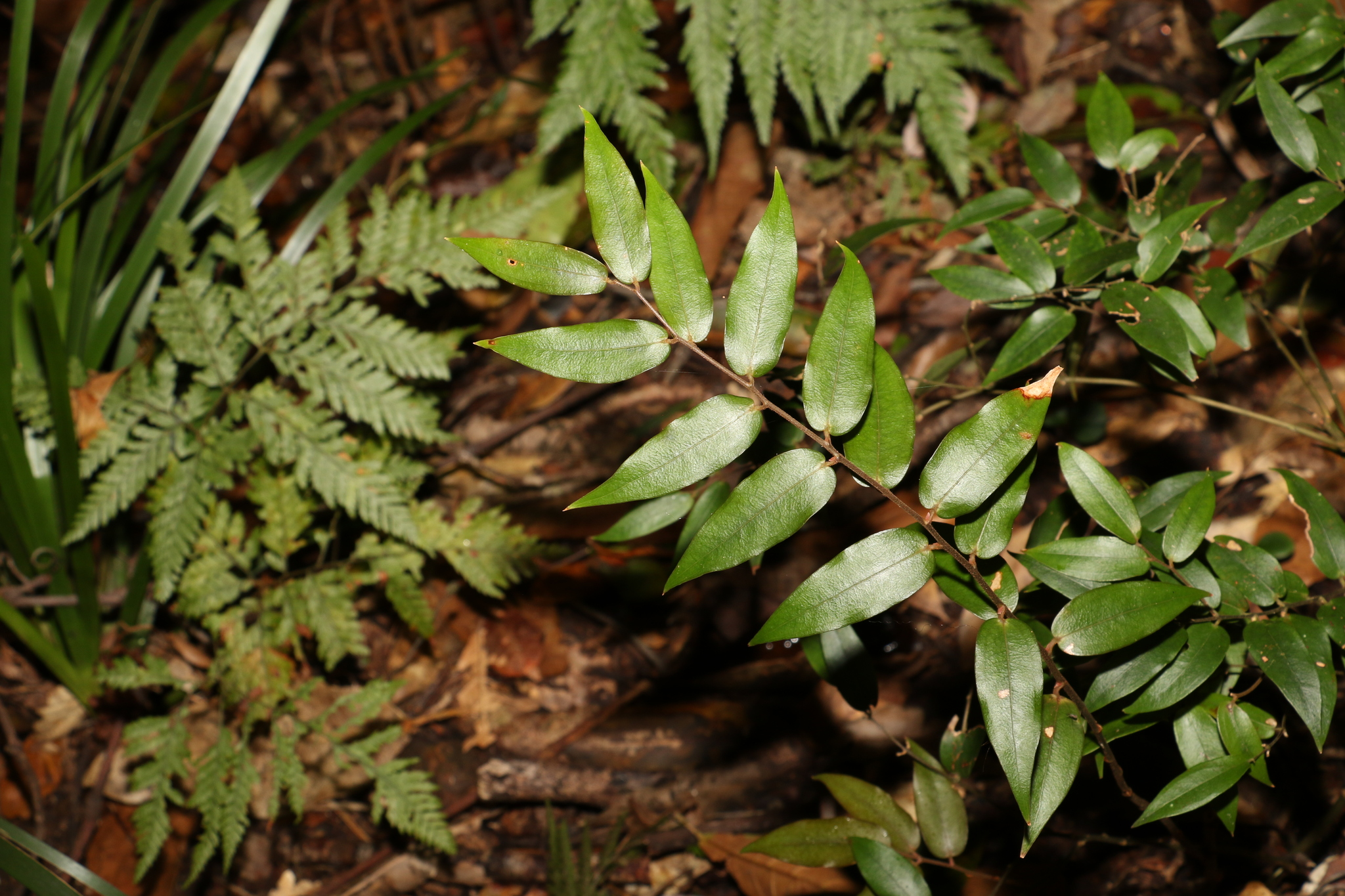

Scientific classification
- Kingdom: Plantae
- Clade: Tracheophytes
- Clade: Angiosperms
- Clade: Monocots
- Order: Liliales
- Family: Ripogonaceae
- Genus: Ripogonum
- Species: R. fawcettianum

Binomial name
- Ripogonum fawcettianum F.Muell. ex Benth.

= Ripogonum fawcettianum =

Species of shrub

Ripogonum fawcettianum, commonly known as small supplejack, is a small climbing vine, or sometimes a shrub, native to coastal rainforests of New South Wales and Queensland, Australia.
