= Trevor Clifford =

Australian botanist and taxonomist (1927–2019)

Trevor Clifford OAM (18 April 1927 – 4 May 2019) was an Australian botanist and taxonomist, distinguished for his work on the hybridisation of species and palaeobotany.

== Early life ==
Harold Trevor Clifford was born in Melbourne, Australia on 18 April 1927. His father owned a furniture shop and later worked as a green grocer in Perth and Melbourne during the Great Depression. After the completion of school, he took employment with the Victorian Department of Education which offered a scholarship to obtain a teaching degree. He was awarded a Dafydd Lewis scholarship and began his study at the University of Melbourne in 1945. Part of his school studies had been in geology and Clifford considered becoming a geology teacher. He graduated with a science degree in 1948, having majored in geology and botany.

Clifford took up employment as a part time tutor in the Department of Botany after graduation and commenced research toward a master's degree on the distribution of eucalypts in the Dandenong Ranges. He also worked in the Herbarium of the Royal Botanic Gardens. After meeting with R. A. Fisher from the University of Cambridge to discuss his research, he was encouraged to prepare a paper for publication which led to him being awarded a scholarship to travel to Durham, England in 1952 to undertake studies toward a PhD for 2 years. Professor David Valentine was his supervisor at Durham University.

== Career ==
Clifford was offered the position of lecturer in agricultural botany at the University College in Ibadan, Nigeria. In 1958, he and his family returned to Australia to take up a position at the University of Queensland. He was awarded a fellowship of the Linnean Society in 1965. He and Professor William Stephenson collaborated on the book An Introduction to numerical classification, an early textbook on multivariate analysis. Clifford was steadily promoted within the department and retired in the early 1990s as an Emeritus Professor.

He published over 200 articles and books. Boxes of his papers are held in the Fryer Library of the University of Queensland.

Clifford took up work at the Queensland Museum in his retirement, collaborating on a project with Mary Dettmann.

The standard author abbreviation Clifford is used to indicate this person as the author when citing a botanical name.

== Personal life ==
Clifford married Gillian Farley in Melbourne in 1953. They had three children. He died in Brisbane on 4 May 2019.

== Memberships and awards ==
- Honorary Life Member of the Royal Society of Queensland
- Order of Australia Medal, for services to botany and tertiary education
