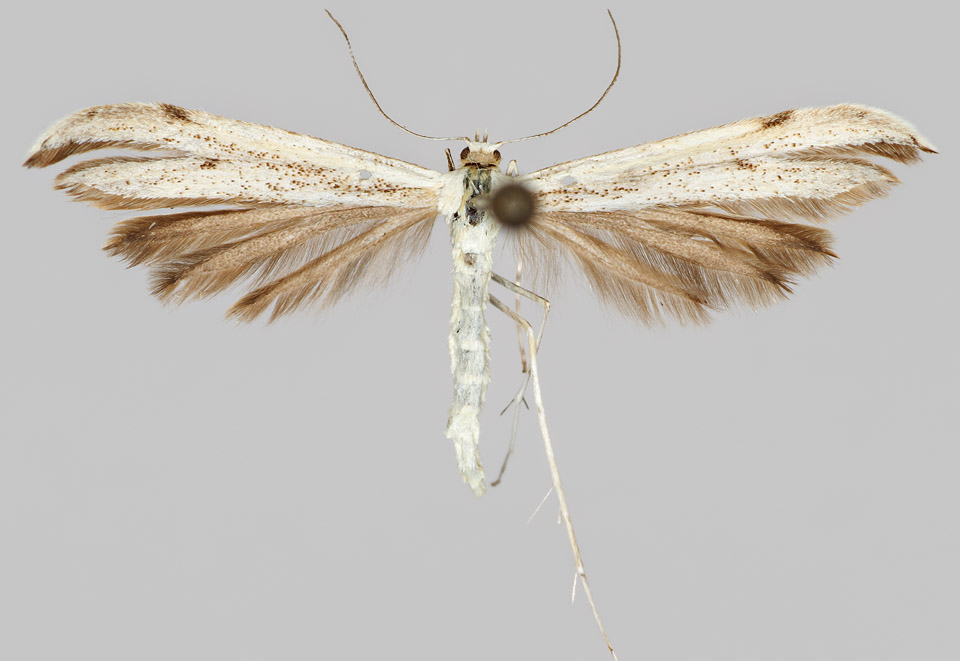

Scientific classification
- Domain: Eukaryota
- Kingdom: Animalia
- Phylum: Arthropoda
- Class: Insecta
- Order: Lepidoptera
- Family: Pterophoridae
- Genus: Hellinsia
- Species: H. didactylites

Binomial name
- Hellinsia didactylites (Ström, 1783)

Synonyms
- Phalaena didactylites Ström, 1783; Alucita didactylites (Ström, 1783); Alucita scarodactyla Hübner, [1813]; Alucita icarodactyla Treitschke, 1833

= Hellinsia didactylites =

Species of plume moth

Hellinsia didactylites is a moth of the family Pterophoridae. It is found in most of Europe (except the Iceland, Ireland, Great Britain, the Iberian Peninsula and most of the Balkan Peninsula), east into Russia.

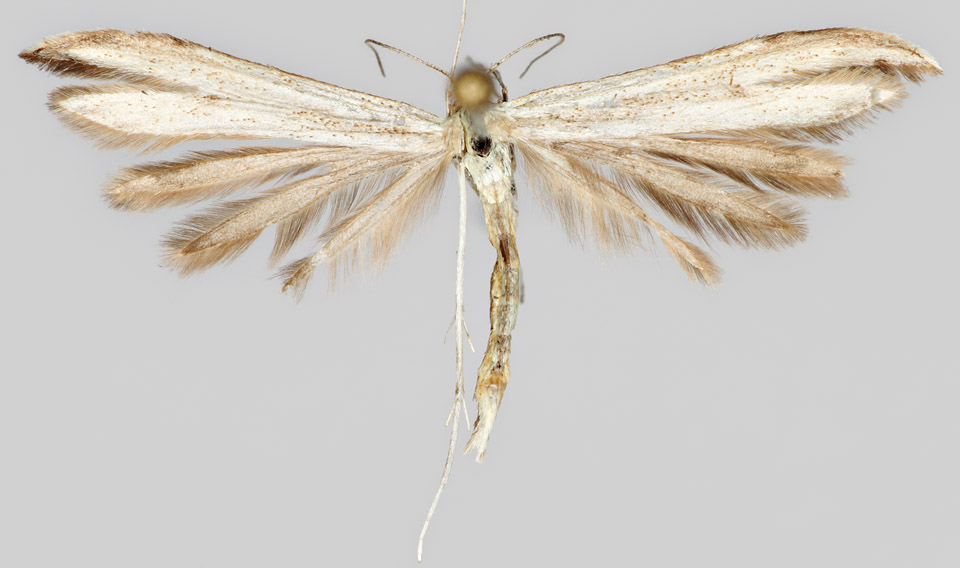

The wingspan is 19–23 millimetres (0.75–0.91 in).

The larvae feed on various Hieracium species including: Hieracium umbellatum, Hieracium prenanthoides, Hieracium amplexicaule, Hieracium murorum, Hieracium lachenalii and Hieracium sylvaticum.
