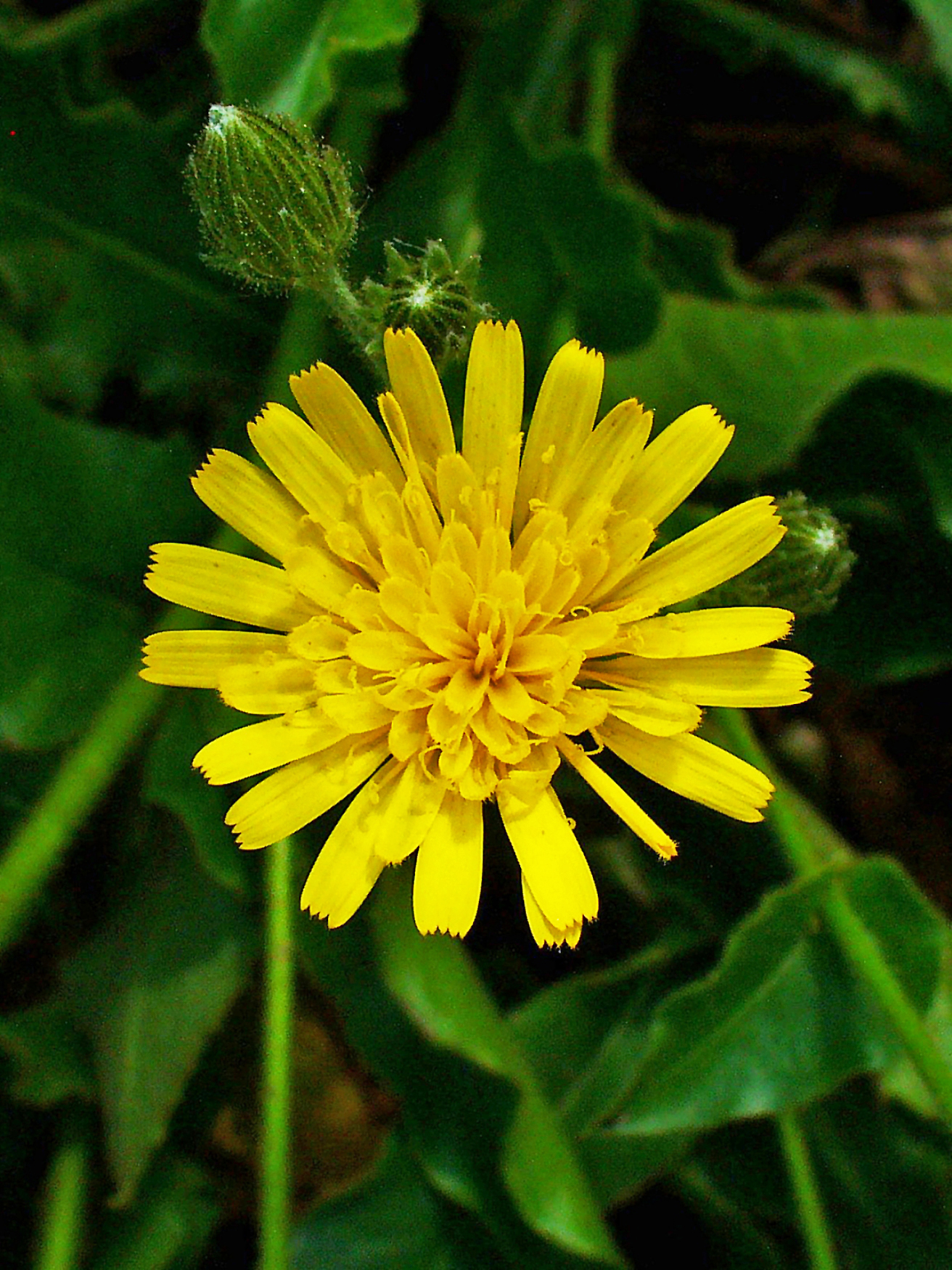
- Hieracium amplexicaule in Botanical Garden KIT, Karlsruhe, Germany.

Scientific classification
- Kingdom: Plantae
- Clade: Tracheophytes
- Clade: Angiosperms
- Clade: Eudicots
- Clade: Asterids
- Order: Asterales
- Family: Asteraceae
- Genus: Hieracium
- Species: H. amplexicaule

Binomial name
- Hieracium amplexicaule L.

= Hieracium amplexicaule =

Species of flowering plant

Hieracium amplexicaule, commonly known as sticky hawkweed, is a perennial herb belonging to the family Asteraceae. This species is native to certain regions of Europe and has been introduced to other parts of the world, where it is considered a xenophyte.

== Botanical description ==
Hieracium amplexicaule is classified as a chamaephyte, a type of perennial plant with regenerative buds located above ground level. It typically grows as a low, woody plant or succulent, not exceeding 30 cm in height. The plant's common name, sticky hawkweed, likely refers to its glandular, adhesive surfaces.

One of the distinctive features of H. amplexicaule is its stem-clasping leaves, as suggested by its specific epithet "amplexicaule", which means "stem-clasping" in Latin.

== Distribution and habitat ==
Hieracium amplexicaule has been documented in various European countries. In Belgium, it has been known to occur in the surroundings of Tongeren since at least 1867. It has also been recorded in neighboring territories, such as near Maastricht in the Netherlands.

== Reproduction and biology ==
Like other members of the genus Hieracium, H. amplexicaule is a facultative apomict, meaning it can reproduce both sexually and asexually. A single one of its ovules can undergo both sexual and asexual megagametogenesis.

== Conservation and ecological impact ==
As an introduced species in some regions, Hieracium amplexicaule may have ecological implications for native flora. However, detailed studies on its environmental impact and conservation status are limited. Further research is needed to fully understand its role in various ecosystems and its potential effects on biodiversity.
