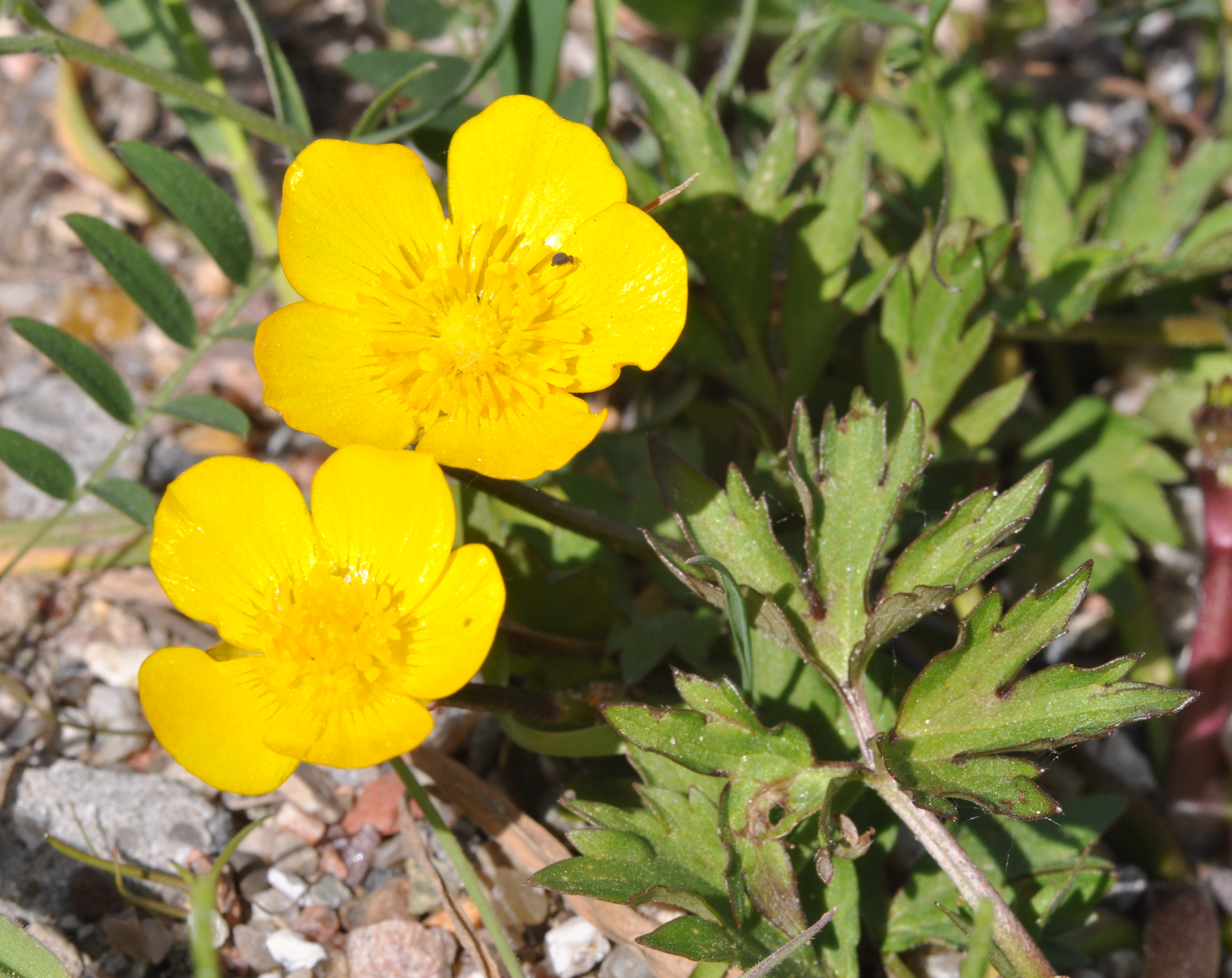
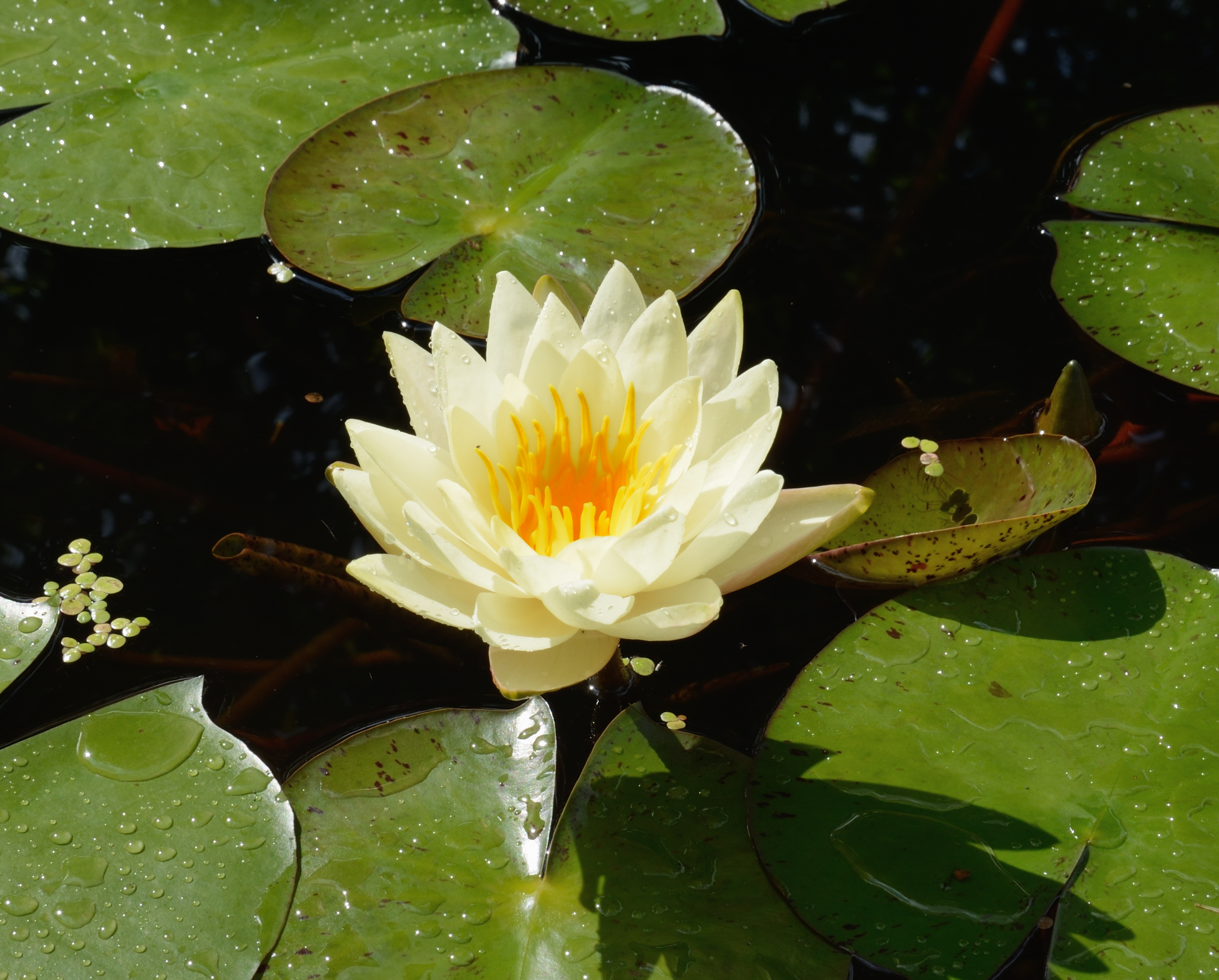
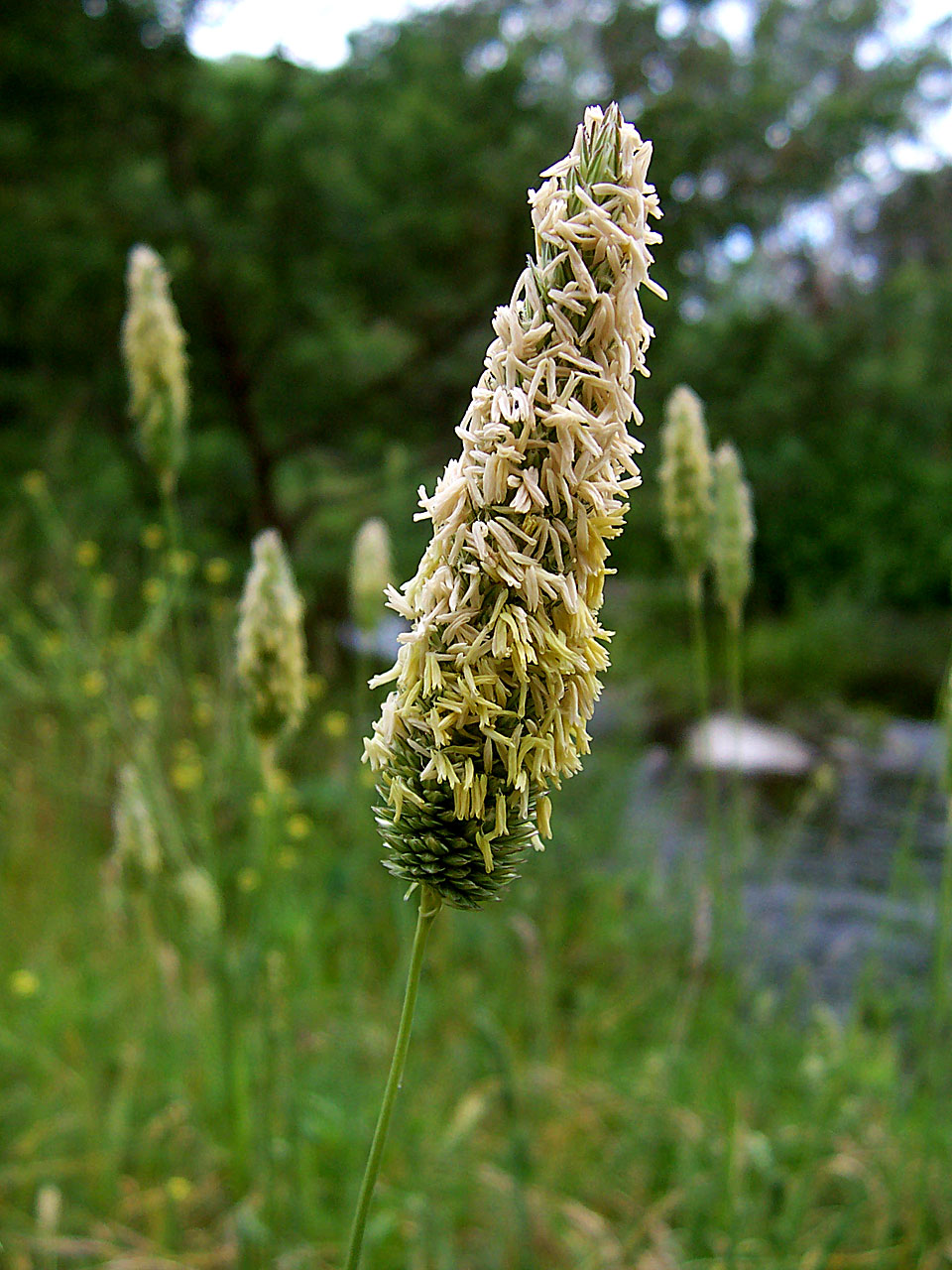
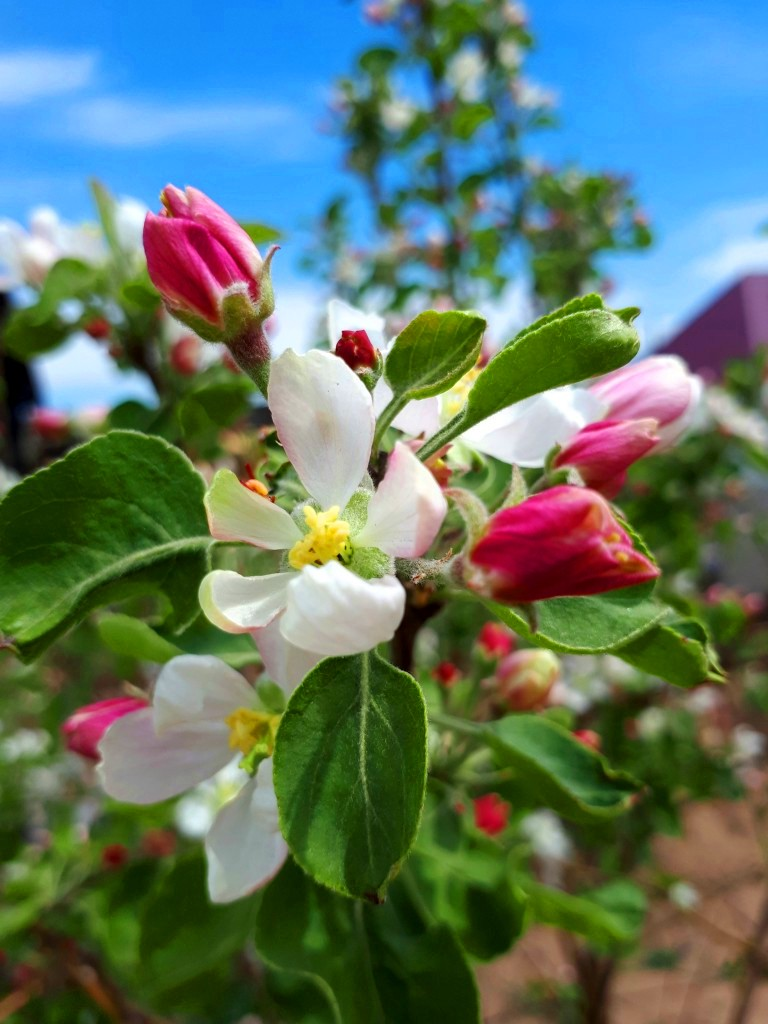
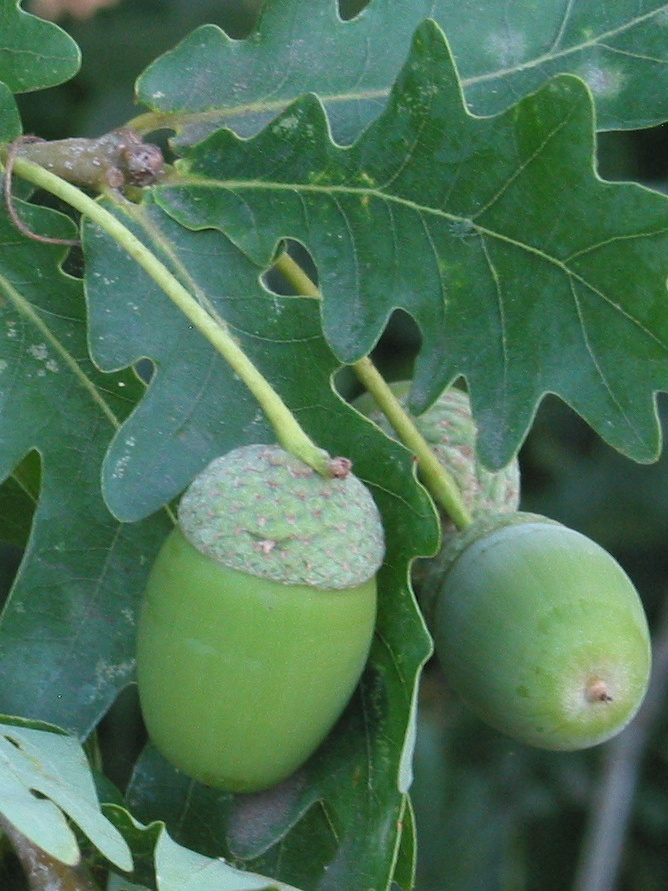
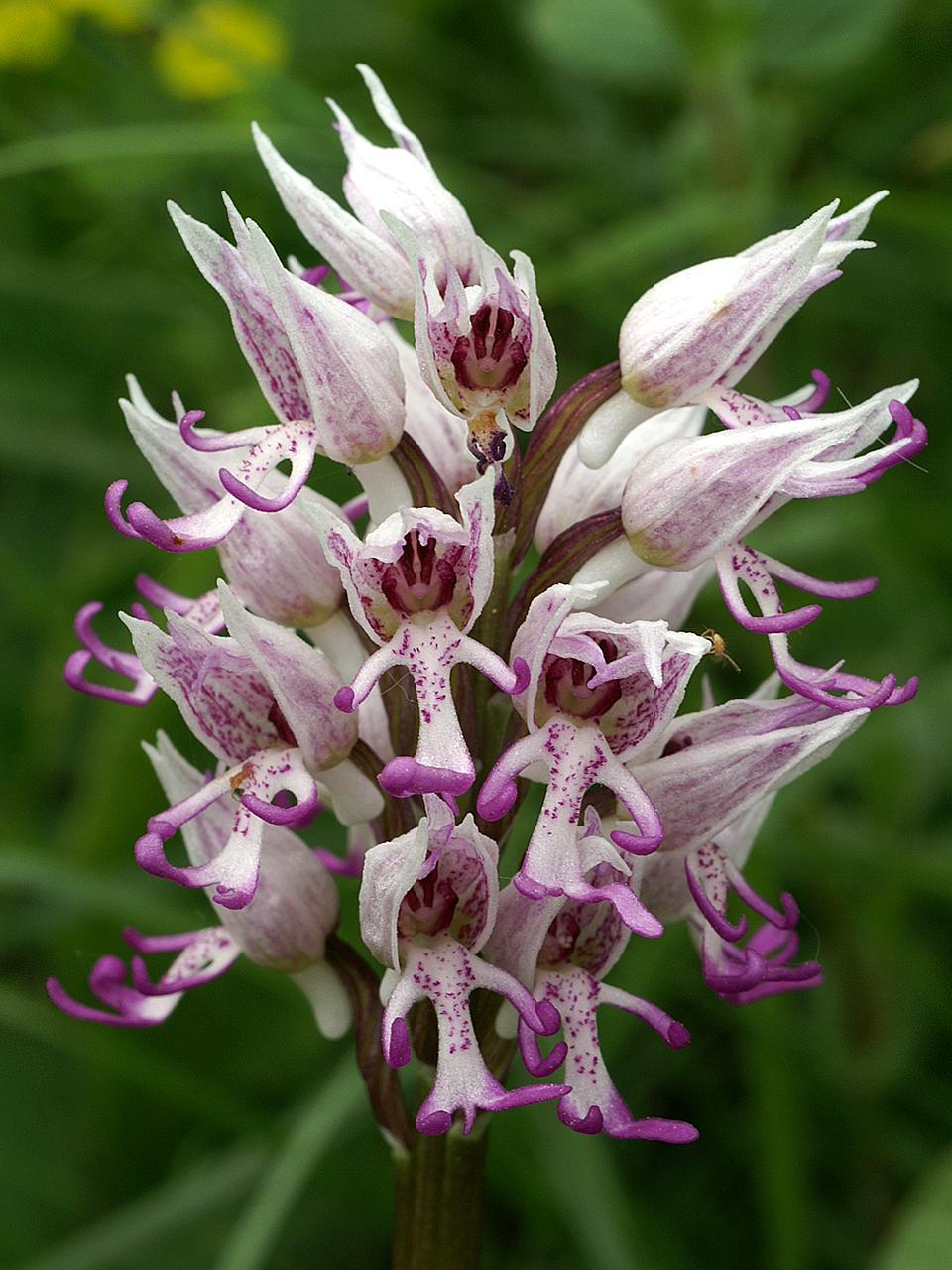
- Terrestrial: buttercup Aquatic: water lily Wind-pollinated: grass Insect-pollinated: apple Tree: oak Forb: orchid Diversity of angiosperms

Scientific classification
- Kingdom: Plantae
- Clade: Tracheophytes
- Clade: Spermatophytes
- Clade: Angiosperms

Groups (APG IV)
- Basal angiosperms: Amborellales; Nymphaeales; Austrobaileyales; Core angiosperms: Unranked clades; Magnoliids; Monocots; Eudicots; Orders; Chloranthales; Ceratophyllales

Synonyms
- Anthophyta Cronquist; Angiospermae Lindl.; Magnoliophyta Cronquist, Takht. & W.Zimm.; Magnolicae Takht.

= Flowering plant =

Flowering plant Temporal range: Early Cretaceous (Valanginian)-Recent

Clade of seed plants that produce flowers

Flowering plants are plants that bear flowers and fruits, and form the clade Angiospermae (/ˌændʒiəˈspɜːrmiː/) or Magnoliophyta. The term angiosperm is derived from the Greek words ἀγγεῖον (angeion: 'container, vessel') and σπέρμα (sperma; 'seed'), meaning that the seeds are enclosed within a fruit.

Angiosperms are by far the most diverse group of land plants with 64 orders, 416 families, approximately 13,000 known genera and 300,000 known species. They include all forbs (flowering plants without a woody stem), grasses and grass-like plants, a vast majority of broad-leaved trees, shrubs and vines, and most aquatic plants. Angiosperms are distinguished from the other major seed plant clade, the gymnosperms, by having flowers, xylem consisting of vessel elements instead of tracheids, endosperm within their seeds, and fruits that completely envelop the seeds. The ancestors of flowering plants diverged from the common ancestor of all living gymnosperms before the end of the Carboniferous, over 300 million years ago. In the Cretaceous, angiosperms diversified explosively, becoming the dominant group of plants across the planet.

Agriculture is almost entirely dependent on angiosperms, and a small number of flowering plant families supply nearly all plant-based food and livestock feed. Rice, maize and wheat provide half of the world's staple calorie intake, and all three plants are cereals from the Poaceae family (colloquially known as grasses). Other families provide important industrial plant products such as wood, paper and cotton, and supply numerous ingredients for drinks, sugar production, traditional medicine and modern pharmaceuticals. Flowering plants are commonly grown for decorative purposes, with certain flowers playing significant cultural roles in many societies. Many flowering plants are threatened by habitat destruction and by climate change.

== Distinguishing features ==
Angiosperms are terrestrial vascular plants; like the gymnosperms, they have roots, stems, leaves, and seeds. They differ from other seed plants in several ways.

Feature	Description	Image
Flowers	The reproductive organs of flowering plants, not found in any other seed plants.	A Narcissus flower in section. Petals and sepals are replaced here by a fused tube, the corona, and tepals.
Reduced gametophytes, three cells in male, seven cells with eight nuclei in female (except for basal angiosperms)	The gametophytes are smaller than those of gymnosperms. The smaller size of the pollen reduces the time between pollination and fertilization, which in gymnosperms is up to a year.	Embryo sac is a reduced female gametophyte.
Endosperm	Endosperm forms after fertilization but before the zygote divides. It provides food for the developing embryo, the cotyledons, and sometimes the seedling.	Embryo sac is a reduced female gametophyte.
Closed carpel enclosing the ovules.	Once the ovules are fertilised, the carpels, often with surrounding tissues, develop into fruits. Gymnosperms have unenclosed seeds.	Peas (seeds, from ovules) inside pod (fruit, from fertilised carpel).
Xylem made of vessel elements	Open vessel elements are stacked end to end to form continuous tubes, whereas gymnosperm xylem is made of tapered tracheids connected by small pits.	Xylem vessels (long tubes).

== Diversity ==
=== Ecological diversity ===
Largest and smallest

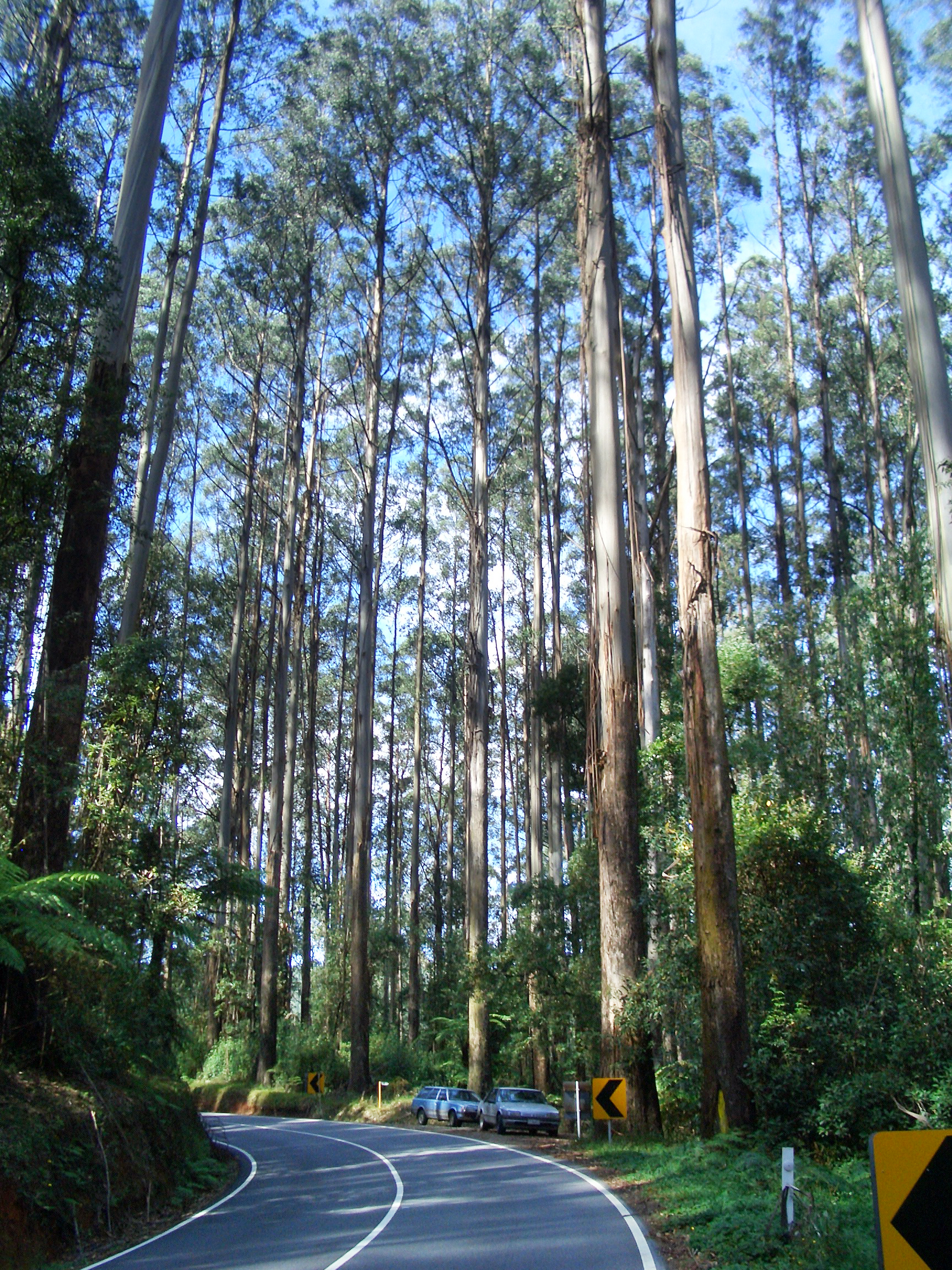
Eucalyptus regnans,
a tree almost 100 m tall

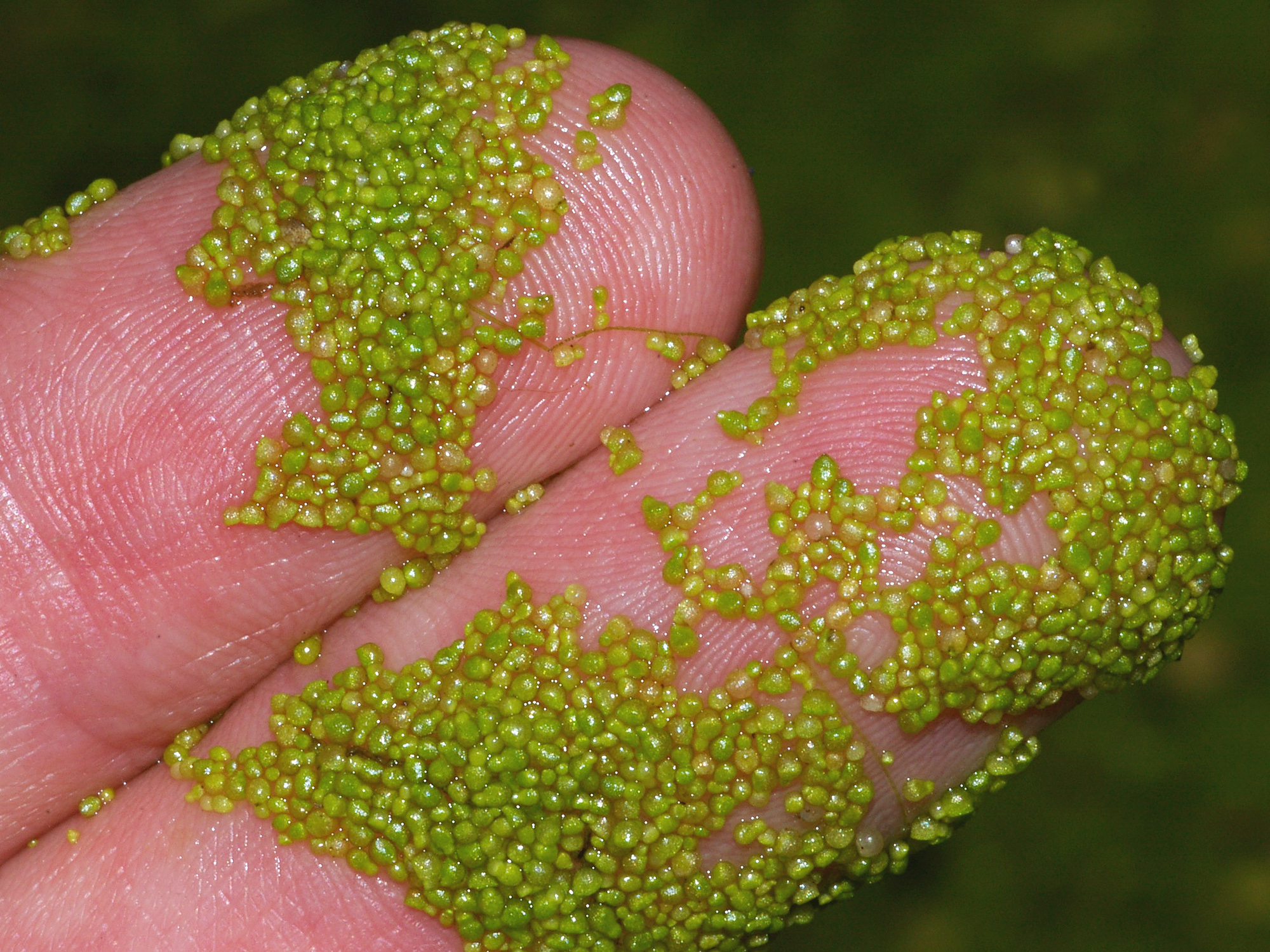
Wolffia arrhiza, a rootless floating freshwater plant under 2 mm across

The largest angiosperms are Eucalyptus gum trees of Australia, and Shorea faguetiana, dipterocarp rainforest trees of Southeast Asia, both of which can reach almost 100 metres (330 ft) in height. The smallest are Wolffia duckweeds which float on freshwater, each plant less than 2 millimetres (0.08 in) across.

Photosynthetic and parasitic

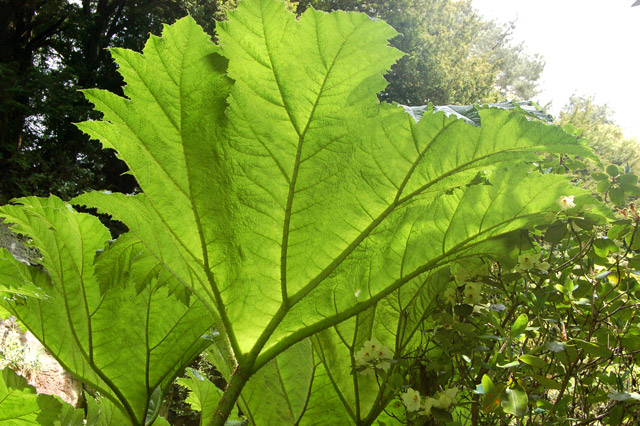
Gunnera captures sunlight for photosynthesis over the large surfaces of its leaves, which are supported by strong veins.

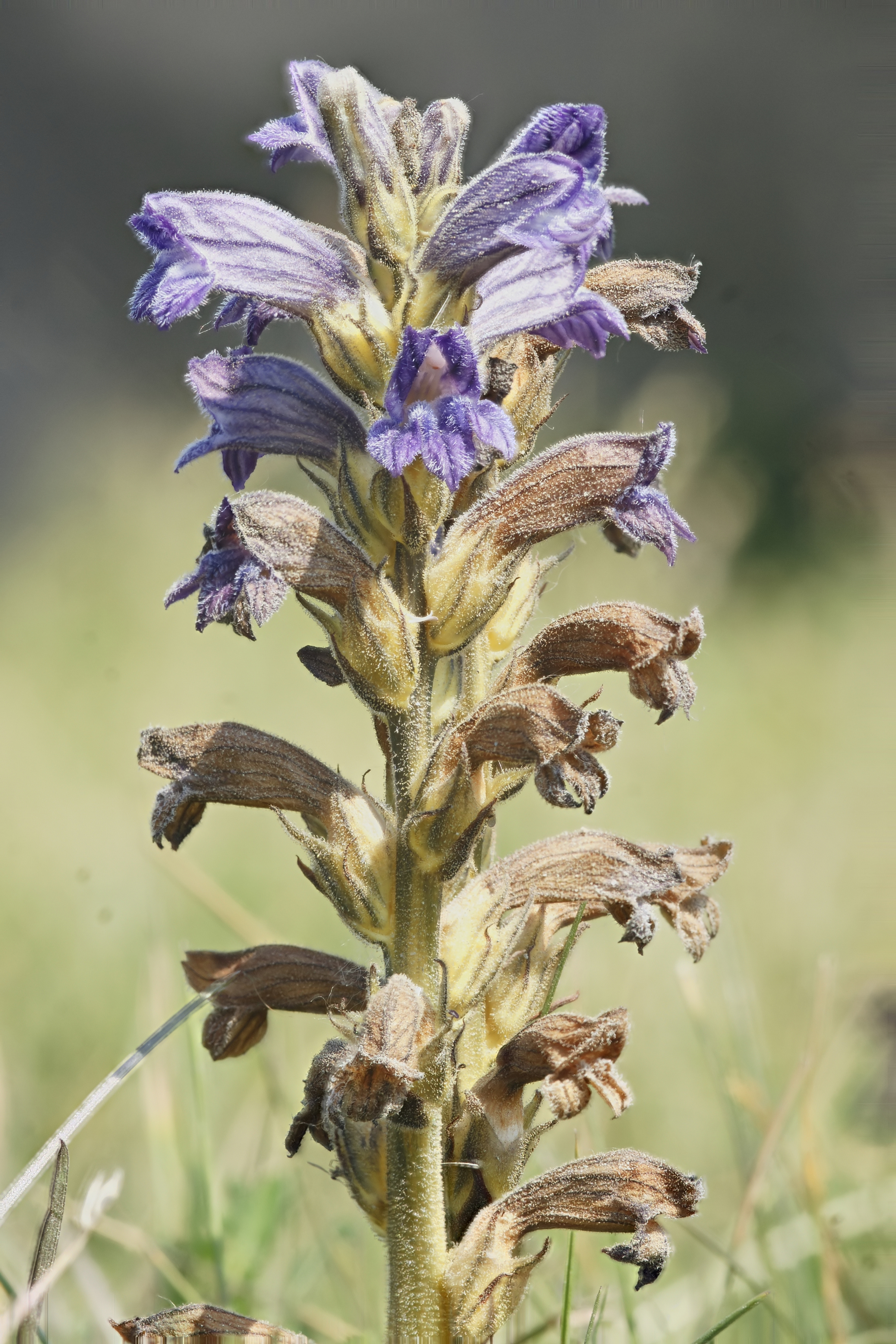
Orobanche purpurea, a parasitic broomrape with no leaves, obtains all its food from other plants.

Considering their method of obtaining energy, some 99% of flowering plants are photosynthetic autotrophs, deriving their energy from sunlight and using it to create molecules such as sugars. The remainder are parasitic, whether on fungi (myco-heterotrophic, formerly thought to be saprophytic) like the orchids for part or all of their life-cycle, or on other plants, either wholly like the broomrapes, Orobanche, or partially like the witchweeds, Striga.

Hot, cold, wet, dry, fresh, salt

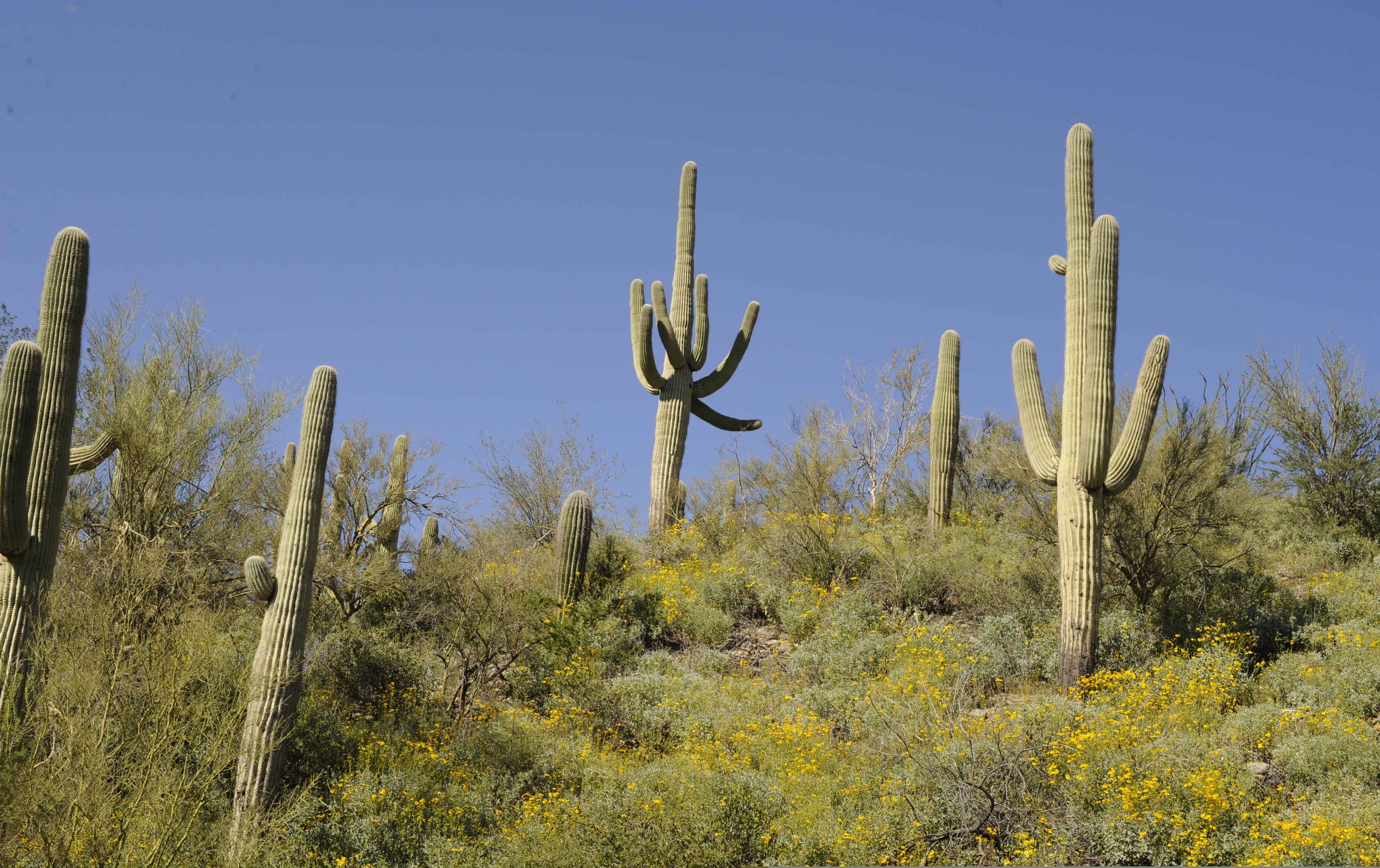
Carnegiea gigantea, the saguaro cactus, grows in hot dry deserts in Mexico and the southern United States.

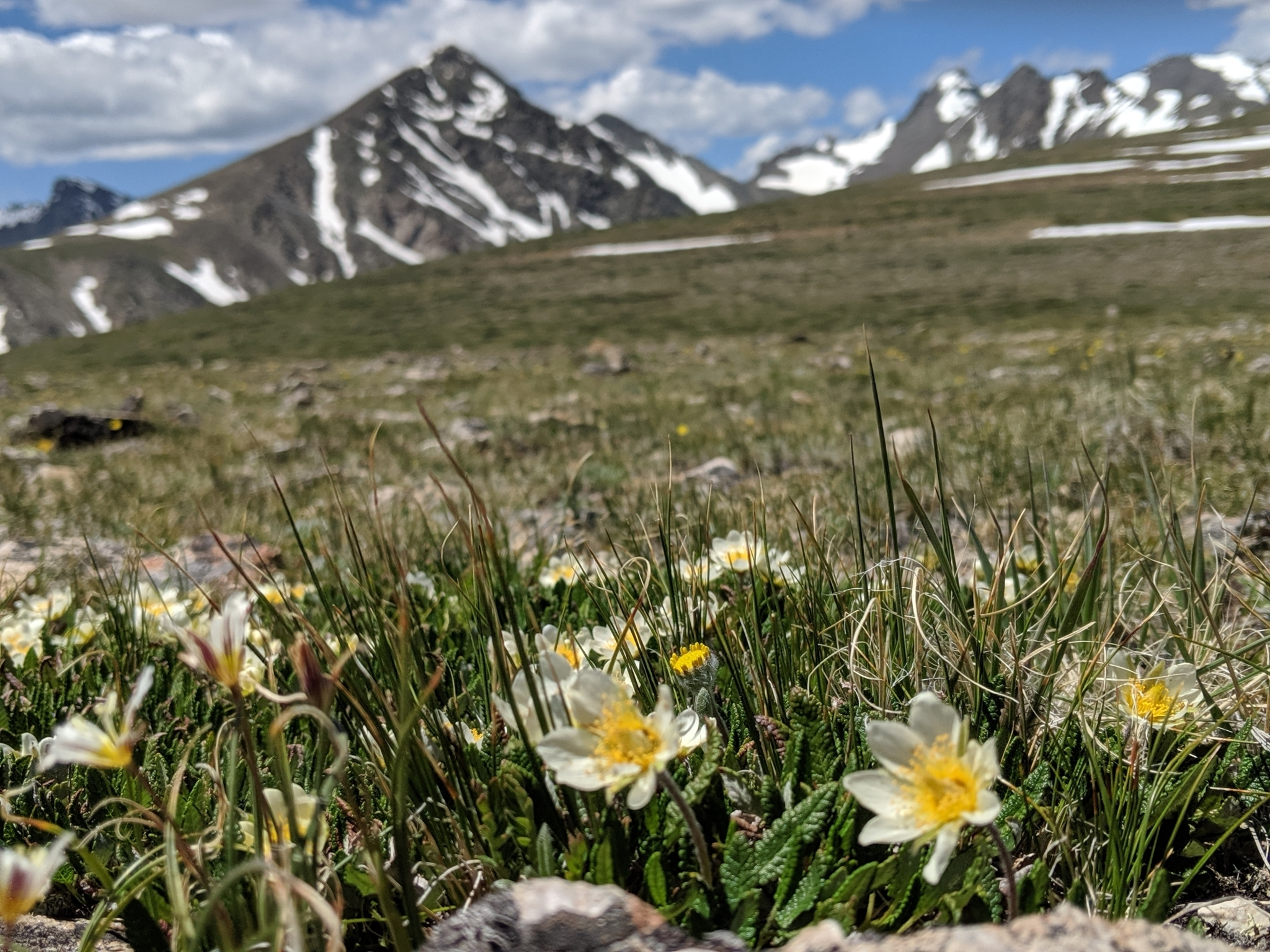
Dryas octopetala, the mountain avens, lives in cold arctic and montane habitats in the far north of America and Eurasia.

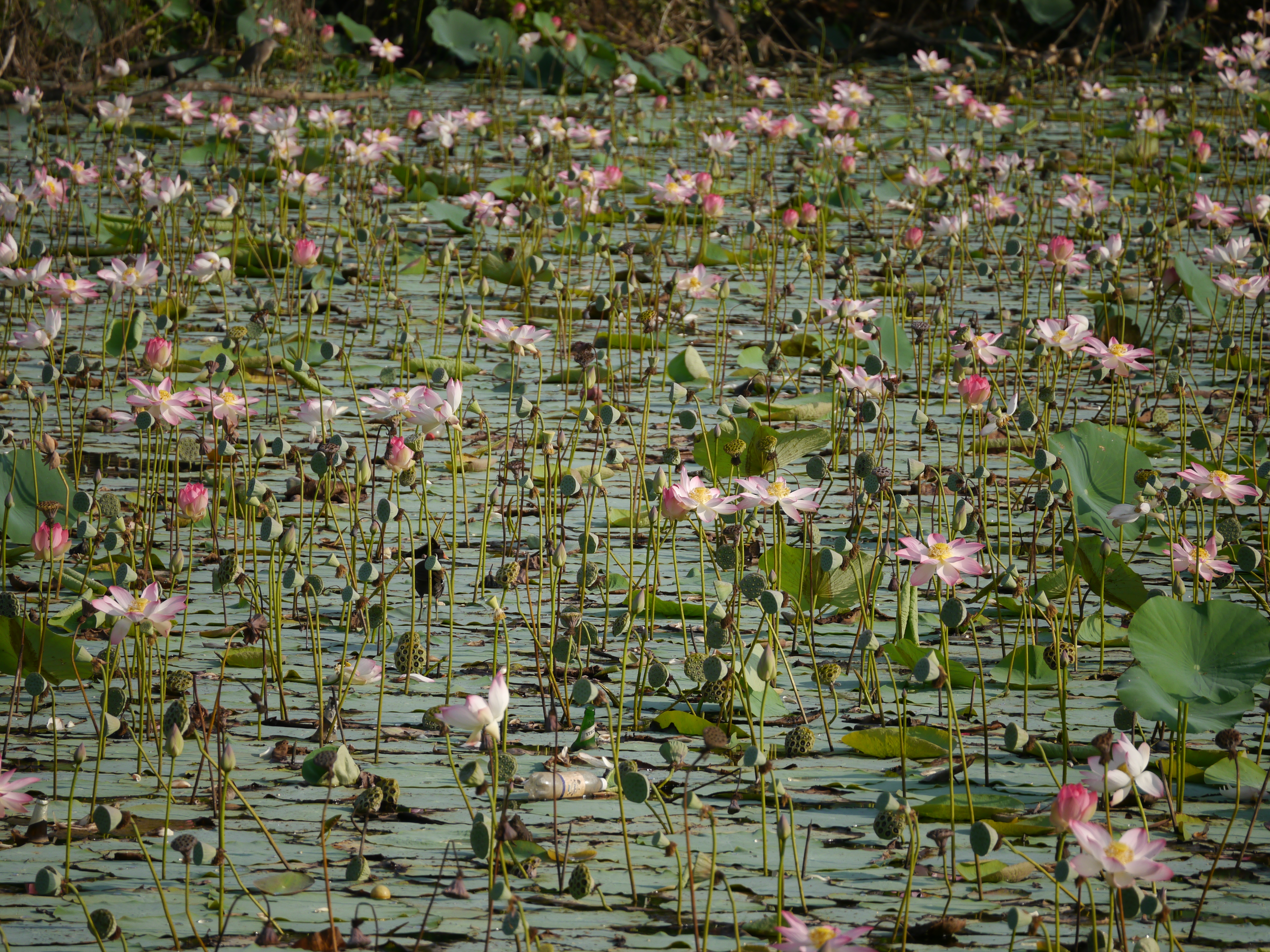
Nelumbo nucifera, the sacred lotus, grows in warm freshwater across tropical and subtropical Asia.

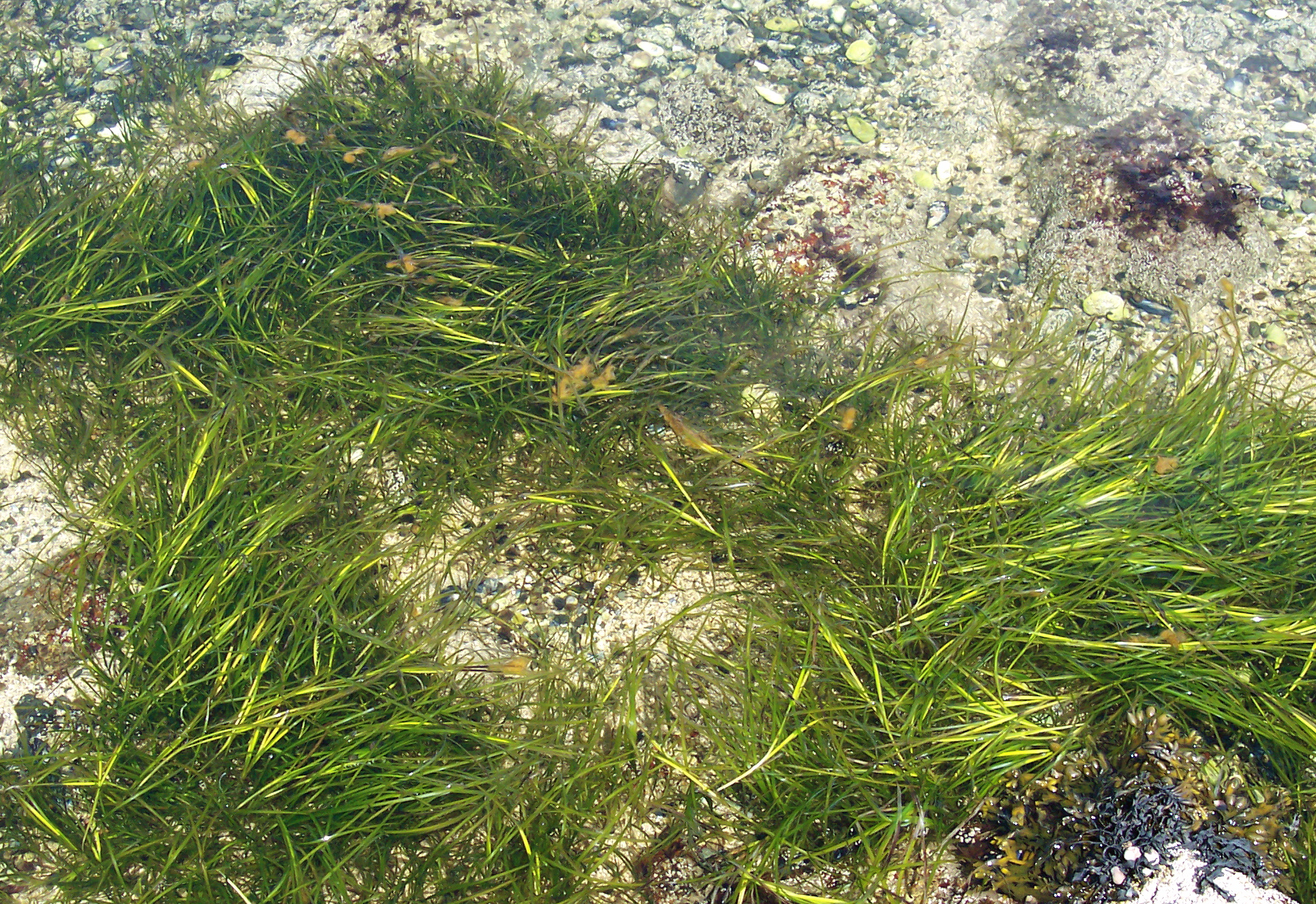
Zostera seagrass grows on the seabed in sheltered coastal waters.

In terms of their environment, flowering plants are cosmopolitan, occupying a wide range of habitats on land, in fresh water and in the sea. On land, they are the dominant plant group in every habitat except for frigid moss-lichen tundra and coniferous forest. The seagrasses in the Alismatales grow in marine environments, spreading with rhizomes that grow through the mud in sheltered coastal waters.

Acid, alkaline

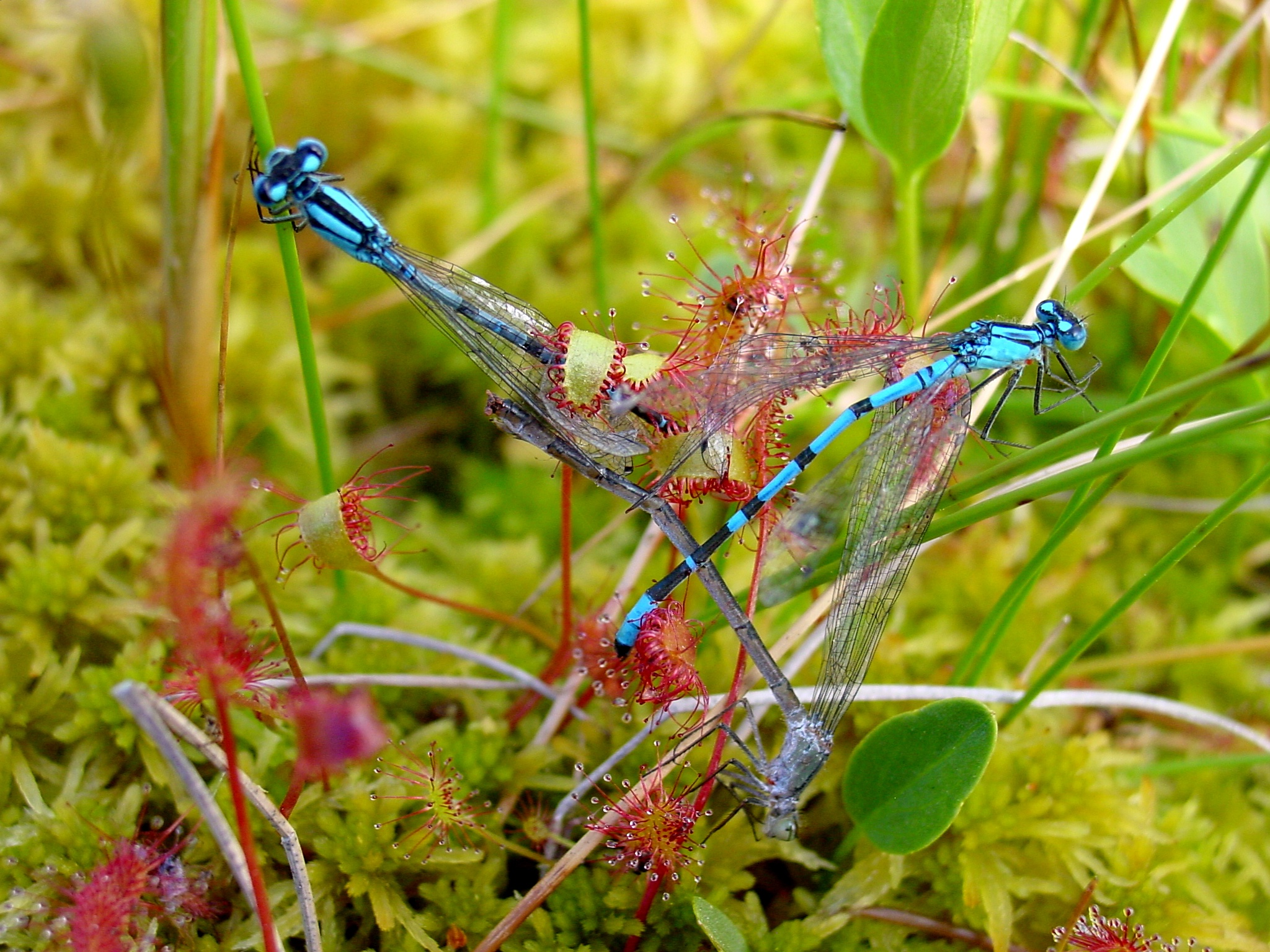
Drosera anglica, a sundew, lives in nutrient-poor acid bogs, deriving nutrients from trapped insects.

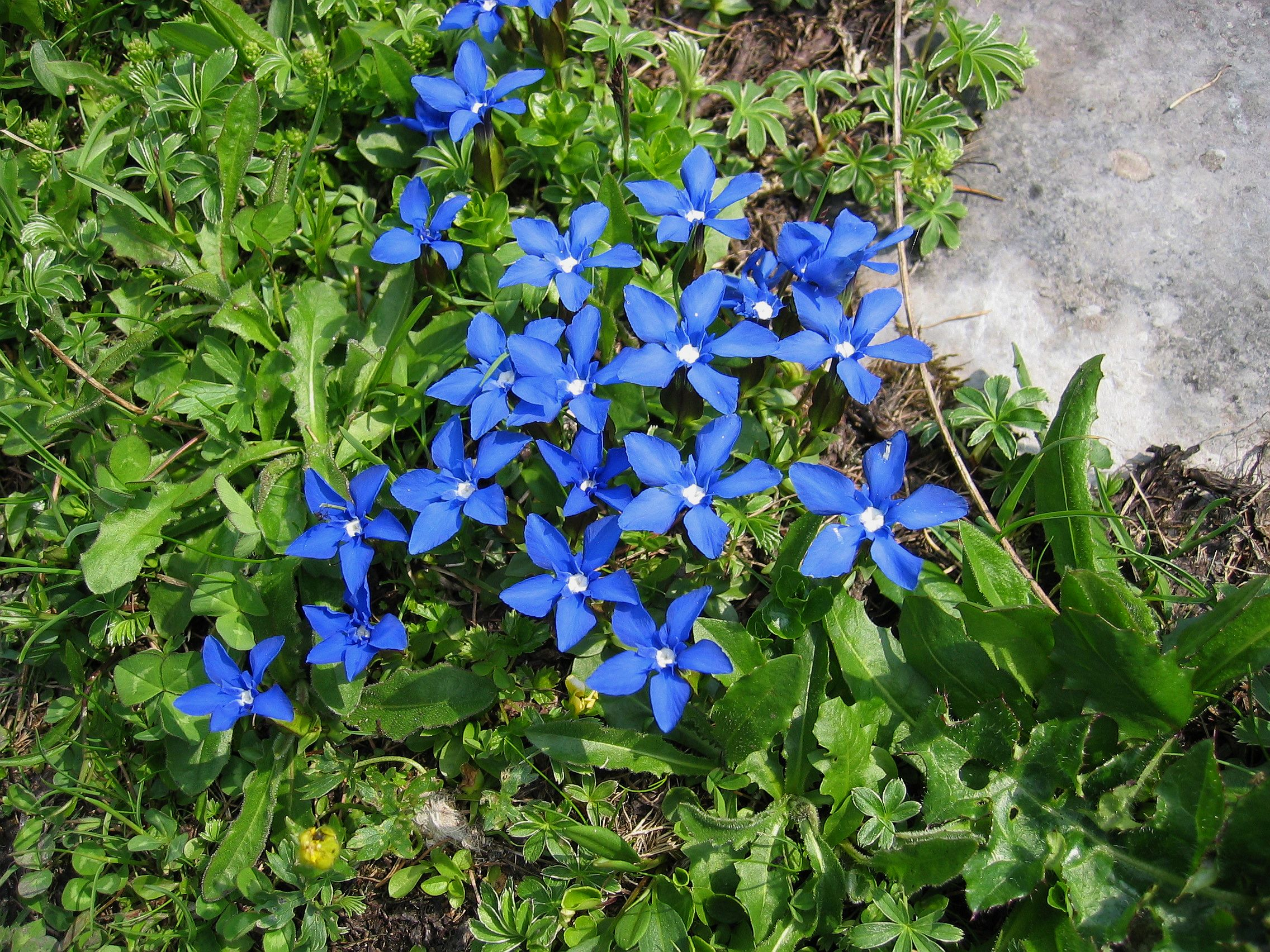
Gentiana verna, the spring gentian, flourishes in dry limestone habitats.

Some specialised angiosperms are able to flourish in extremely acid or alkaline habitats. The sundews, many of which live in nutrient-poor acid bogs, are carnivorous plants, able to derive nutrients such as nitrate from the bodies of trapped insects. Other flowers such as Gentiana verna, the spring gentian, are adapted to the alkaline conditions found on calcium-rich chalk and limestone, which give rise to often dry topographies such as limestone pavement.

Herbaceous, woody, climbing

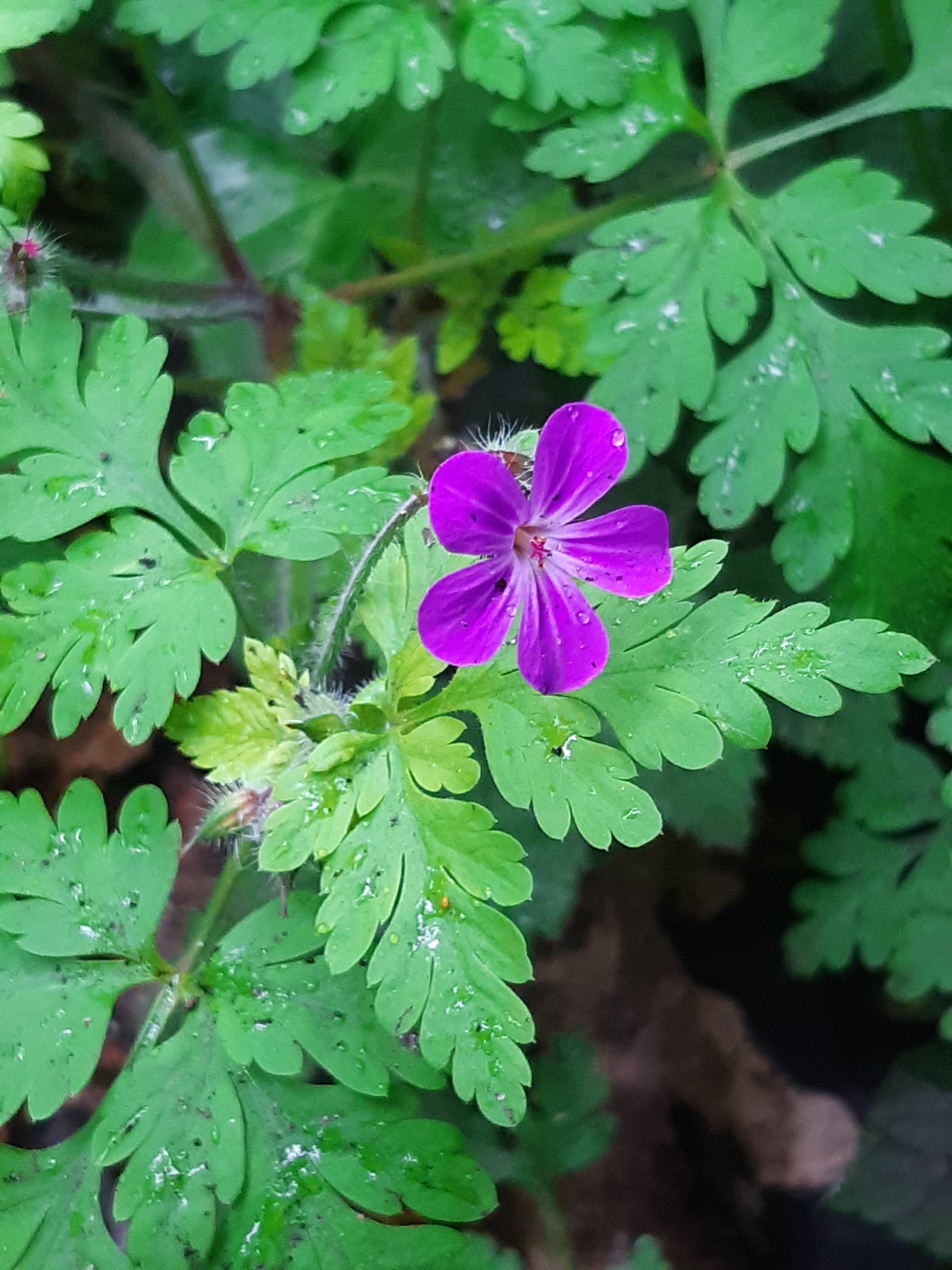
Geranium robertianum, herb-Robert, is an annual or biennial herb of Europe and North America.

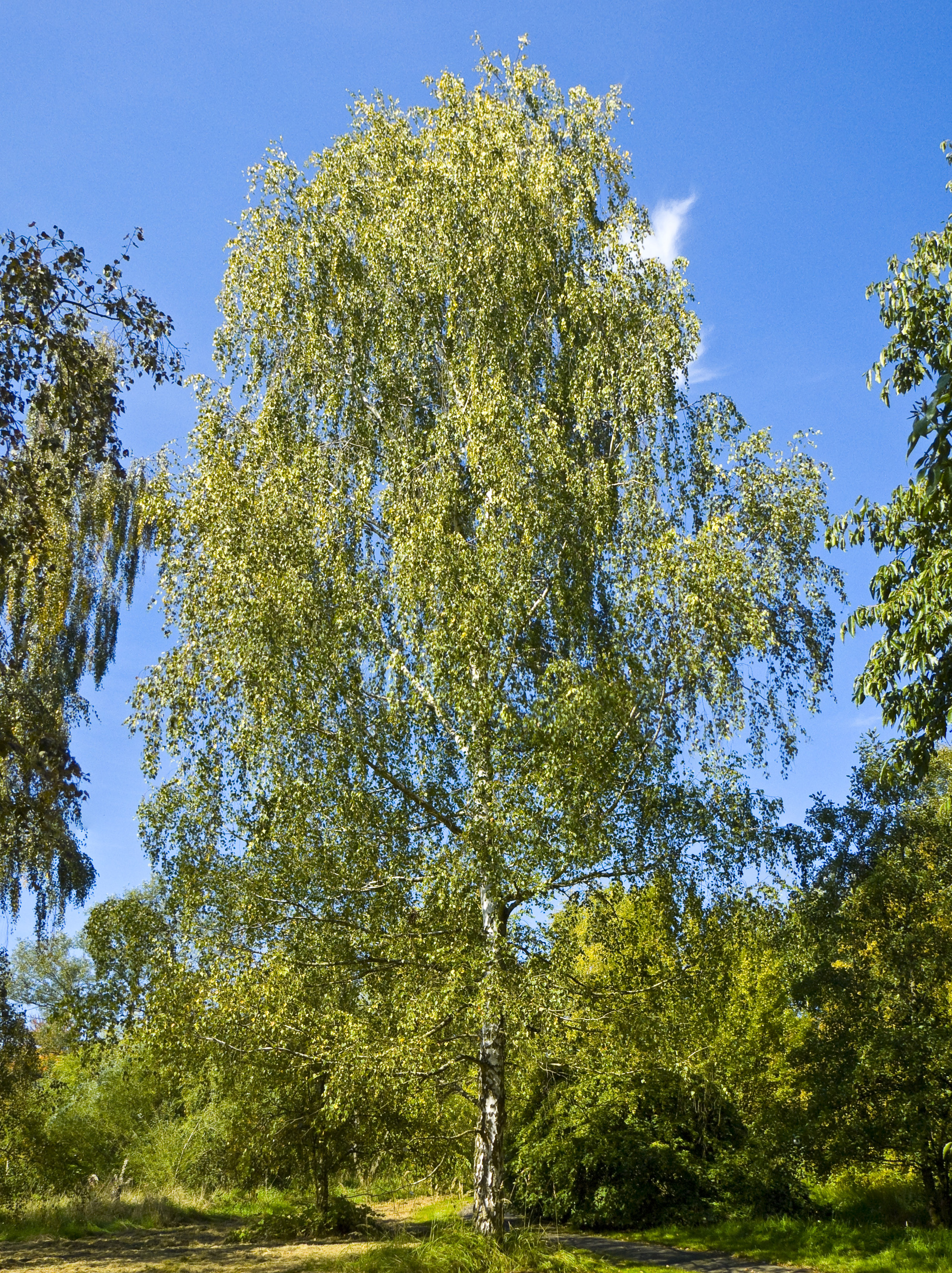
Betula pendula, the silver birch, is a perennial deciduous tree of Eurasia.

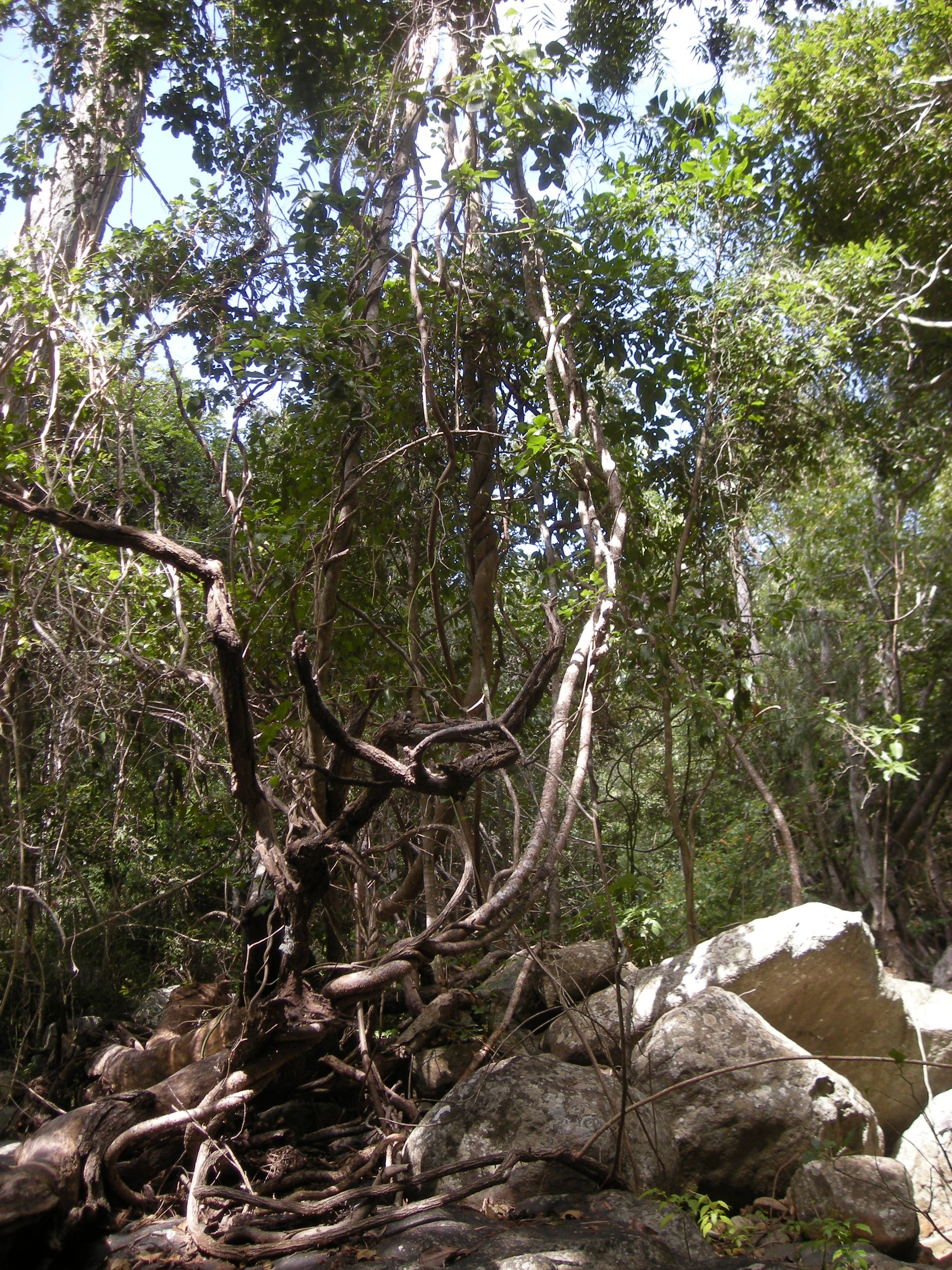
Lianas Austrosteenisia, Parsonsia, and Sarcopetalum climbing trees in Australia

As for their growth habit, the flowering plants range from small, soft herbaceous plants, often living as annuals or biennials that set seed and die after one or two growing seasons, to large perennial woody trees that may live for many centuries and grow to many metres in height. Some species grow tall without being self-supporting like trees by climbing on other plants in the manner of vines or lianas.

=== Taxonomic diversity ===
The number of species of flowering plants is estimated to be in the range of 250,000 to 400,000. This compares to around 12,000 species of moss and 11,000 species of pteridophytes. The APG system seeks to determine the number of families, mostly by molecular phylogenetics. In the 2009 APG III there were 415 families. The 2016 APG IV added five new orders (Boraginales, Dilleniales, Icacinales, Metteniusales and Vahliales), along with some new families, for a total of 64 angiosperm orders and 416 families.

The diversity of flowering plants is not evenly distributed. Nearly all species belong to the eudicot (75%), monocot (23%), and magnoliid (2%) clades. The remaining five clades contain a little over 250 species in total; i.e. less than 0.1% of flowering plant diversity, divided among nine families. The 25 most species-rich of 443 families, containing over 166,000 species between them in their APG circumscriptions, are:

The 25 largest angiosperm families
	Group	Family	English name	No. of spp.
1	Eudicot	Asteraceae or Compositae	daisy	22,750
2	Monocot	Orchidaceae	orchid	21,950
3	Eudicot	Fabaceae or Leguminosae	pea, legume	19,400
4	Eudicot	Rubiaceae	madder	13,150
5	Monocot	Poaceae or Gramineae	grass	10,035
6	Eudicot	Lamiaceae or Labiatae	mint	7,175
7	Eudicot	Euphorbiaceae	spurge	5,735
8	Eudicot	Melastomataceae	melastome	5,005
9	Eudicot	Myrtaceae	myrtle	4,625
10	Eudicot	Apocynaceae	dogbane	4,555
11	Monocot	Cyperaceae	sedge	4,350
12	Eudicot	Malvaceae	mallow	4,225
13	Monocot	Araceae	arum	4,025
14	Eudicot	Ericaceae	heath	3,995
15	Eudicot	Gesneriaceae	gesneriad	3,870
16	Eudicot	Apiaceae or Umbelliferae	parsley	3,780
17	Eudicot	Brassicaceae or Cruciferae	cabbage	3,710
18	Magnoliid dicot	Piperaceae	pepper	3,600
19	Monocot	Bromeliaceae	bromeliad	3,540
20	Eudicot	Acanthaceae	acanthus	3,500
21	Eudicot	Rosaceae	rose	2,830
22	Eudicot	Boraginaceae	borage	2,740
23	Eudicot	Urticaceae	nettle	2,625
24	Eudicot	Ranunculaceae	buttercup	2,525
25	Magnoliid dicot	Lauraceae	laurel	2,500

== Evolution ==
=== History of classification ===
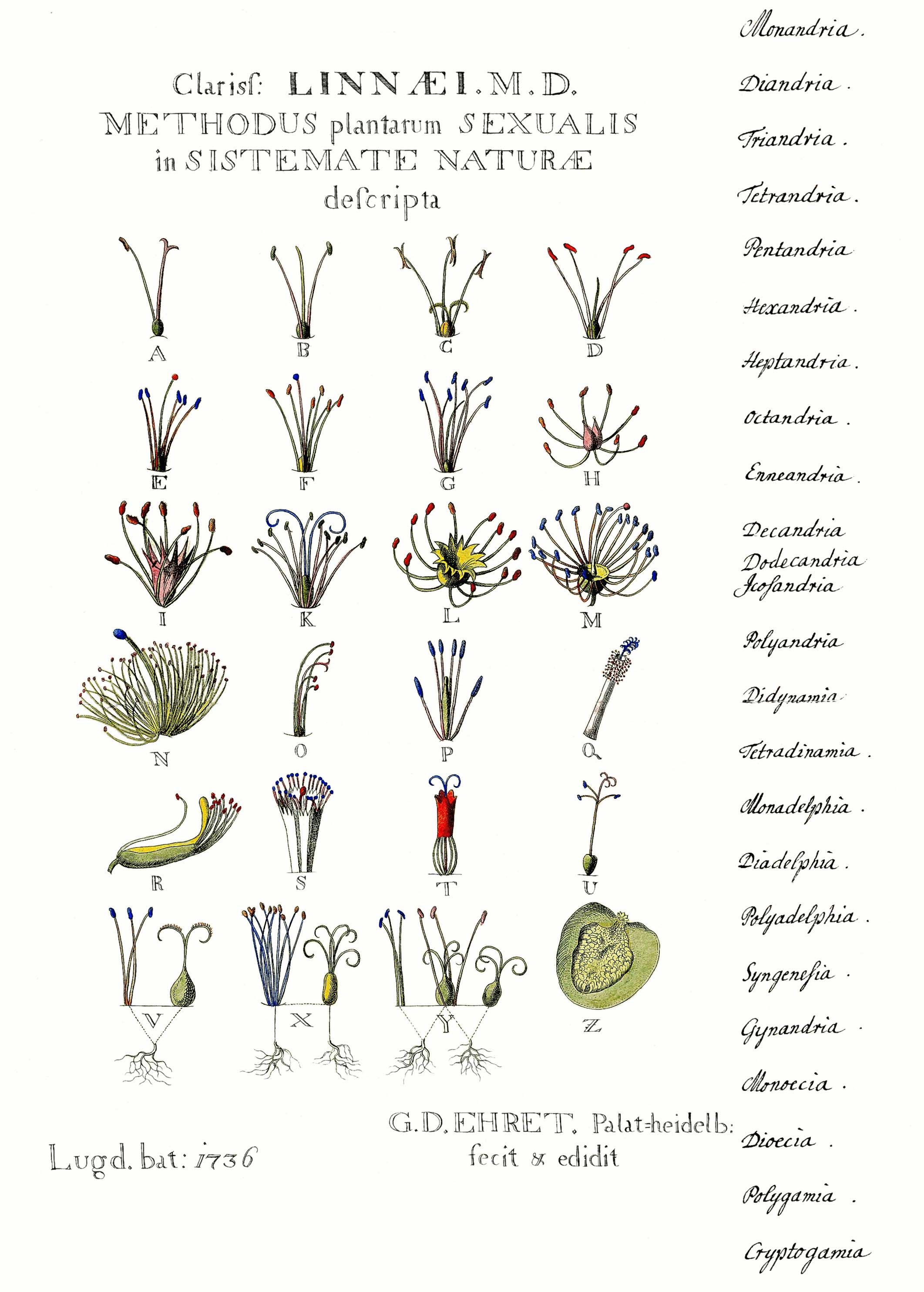
From 1736, an illustration of Linnaean classification

The botanical term "angiosperm", from Greek words angeíon (ἀγγεῖον 'bottle, vessel') and spérma (σπέρμα 'seed'), was coined in the form "Angiospermae" by Paul Hermann in 1690, including only flowering plants whose seeds were enclosed in capsules. The term angiosperm fundamentally changed in meaning in 1827 with Robert Brown, when angiosperm came to mean a seed plant with enclosed ovules. In 1851, with Wilhelm Hofmeister's work on embryo-sacs, Angiosperm came to have its modern meaning of all the flowering plants including Dicotyledons and Monocotyledons.

From 1998, the Angiosperm Phylogeny Group (APG) has reclassified the angiosperms, with updates in the APG II system in 2003, the APG III system in 2009, and the APG IV system in 2016.The APG system treats the flowering plants as an unranked clade without a formal Latin name (angiosperms). A formal classification was published alongside the 2009 revision in which the flowering plants rank as the subclass Magnoliidae.

=== Coevolution with pollinators ===
The evolutionary success and rapid diversification of angiosperms are largely attributed to their coevolutionary relationships with animal pollinators, particularly insects, birds, and bats. Unlike gymnosperms, which rely primarily on wind for pollen dispersal, flowering plants developed specialized traits—such as nectar production, vivid pigmentations, and complex volatile scents—to attract specific floral visitors. This mutualism often leads to pollination syndromes, where the morphology of a flower evolves to match the anatomy and sensory capabilities of its primary pollinator. For example, tube-shaped flowers often coevolve with long-tongued insects or hummingbirds, ensuring high pollination efficiency through physical "fit." This specialized relationship acts as a driver for reproductive isolation, as minor changes in floral structure can shift a plant's pollinator reliance, leading to the formation of new species and contributing to the immense taxonomic diversity of the clade.

=== Phylogeny ===
==== External ====
In 2019, a molecular phylogeny of plants placed the flowering plants in their evolutionary context:

- Embryophytes land plants
  - - Bryophytes
    - Tracheophytes vascular plants
      - Lycophytes
      - - Ferns
        - Spermatophytes seed plants
          - Gymnosperms conifers and allies
          - Angiosperms flowering plants

==== Internal ====
The main groups of living angiosperms are:

- Angiosperms
  - Amborellales 1 sp. New Caledonia shrub
  - - Nymphaeales c. 80 spp. water lilies & allies
    - - Austrobaileyales c. 100 spp. woody plants
      - - - Magnoliids c. 10,000 spp. 3-part flowers, 1-pore pollen, usu. branch-veined leaves
          - Chloranthales 77 spp. Woody, apetalous
        - - Monocots c. 70,000 spp. 3-part flowers, 1 cotyledon, 1-pore pollen, usu. parallel-veined leaves
          - - Ceratophyllales c. 6 spp. aquatic plants
            - Eudicots c. 175,000 spp. 4- or 5-part flowers, 3-pore pollen, usu. branch-veined leaves

Detailed cladogram of the 2016 Angiosperm Phylogeny Group (APG) IV classification.

- Angiosperms
  - Amborellales Melikyan, Bobrov & Zaytzeva 1999
  - - Nymphaeales Salisbury ex von Berchtold & Presl 1820
    - - Austrobaileyales Takhtajan ex Reveal 1992
      - Mesangiosperms
        - Chloranthales Mart. 1835
        - - Magnoliids
            - - Canellales Cronquist 1957
              - Piperales von Berchtold & Presl 1820
            - - Magnoliales de Jussieu ex von Berchtold & Presl 1820
              - Laurales de Jussieu ex von Berchtold & Presl 1820
        - - - Monocots
              - Acorales Link 1835
              - - Alismatales Brown ex von Berchtold & Presl 1820
                - - Petrosaviales Takhtajan 1997
                  - - - Dioscoreales Brown 1835
                      - Pandanales Brown ex von Berchtold & Presl 1820
                    - - Liliales Perleb 1826
                      - - Asparagales Link 1829
                        - Commelinids
                          - Arecales Bromhead 1840
                          - - Poales Small 1903
                            - - Zingiberales Grisebach 1854
                              - Commelinales de Mirbel ex von Berchtold & Presl 1820
          - - Ceratophyllales Link 1829
            - Eudicots
              - Ranunculales de Jussieu ex von Berchtold & Presl 1820
              - - Proteales de Jussieu ex von Berchtold & Presl 1820
                - - Trochodendrales Takhtajan ex Cronquist 1981
                  - - Buxales Takhtajan ex Reveal 1996
                    - Core eudicots
                      - Gunnerales Takhtajan ex Reveal 1992
                      - - Dilleniales de Candolle ex von Berchtold & Presl 1820
                        - Superrosids
                          - Saxifragales von Berchtold & Presl 1820
                          - Rosids
                            - Vitales de Jussieu ex von Berchtold & Presl 1820
                            - - Fabids (eurosids I)
                                - Zygophyllales Link 1829
                                - - - Celastrales Link 1829
                                    - - Oxalidales von Berchtold & Presl 1820
                                      - Malpighiales de Jussieu ex von Berchtold & Presl 1820
                                  - - Fabales Bromhead 1838
                                    - - Rosales von Berchtold & Presl 1820
                                      - - Cucurbitales de Jussieu ex von Berchtold & Presl 1820
                                        - Fagales Engler 1892
                              - Malvids (eurosids II)
                                - - Geraniales de Jussieu ex von Berchtold & Presl 1820
                                  - Myrtales de Jussieu ex von Berchtold & Presl 1820
                                - - Crossosomatales Takhtajan ex Reveal 1993
                                  - - Picramniales Doweld 2001
                                    - - Sapindales de Jussieu ex von Berchtold & Presl 1820
                                      - - Huerteales Doweld 2001
                                        - - Malvales de Jussieu ex von Berchtold & Presl 1820
                                          - Brassicales Bromhead 1838
                        - Superasterids
                          - Berberidopsidales Doweld 2001
                          - - Santalales Brown ex von Berchtold & Presl 1820
                            - - Caryophyllales
                              - Asterids
                                - Cornales Link 1829
                                - - Ericales von Berchtold & Presl 1820
                                  - - Lamiids (euasterids I)
                                      - Icacinales Van Tieghem 1900
                                      - - Metteniusales Takhtajan 1997
                                        - - Garryales Mart. 1835
                                          - - Gentianales de Jussieu ex von Berchtold & Presl 1820
                                            - Solanales de Jussieu ex von Berchtold & Presl 1820
                                            - Boraginales de Jussieu ex von Berchtold & Presl 1820
                                            - Vahliales Doweld 2001
                                            - Lamiales Bromhead 1838
                                    - Campanulids (euasterids II)
                                      - Aquifoliales Senft 1856
                                      - - Escalloniales Mart. 1835
                                        - Asterales Link 1829
                                        - - Bruniales Dumortier 1829
                                          - - Apiales Nakai 1930
                                            - - Paracryphiales Takhtajan ex Reveal 1992
                                              - Dipsacales de Jussieu ex von Berchtold & Presl 1820

In 2024, Alexandre R. Zuntini and colleagues constructed a tree of some 6,000 flowering plant genera, representing some 60% of the existing genera, on the basis of analysis of 353 nuclear genes in each specimen. Much of the existing phylogeny is confirmed; the rosid phylogeny is revised.

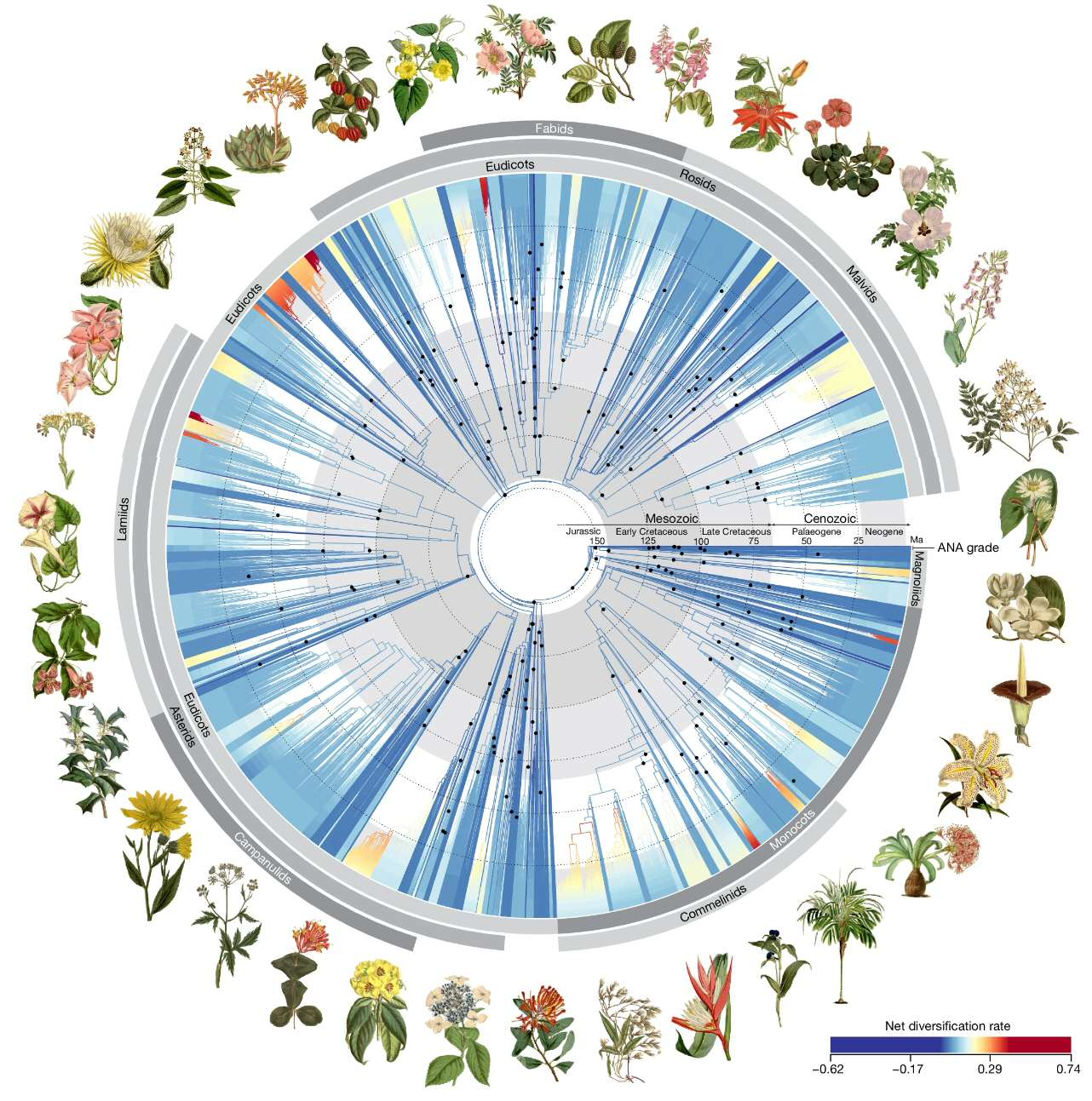
Tree of Angiosperm phylogeny 2024

=== Fossil history ===
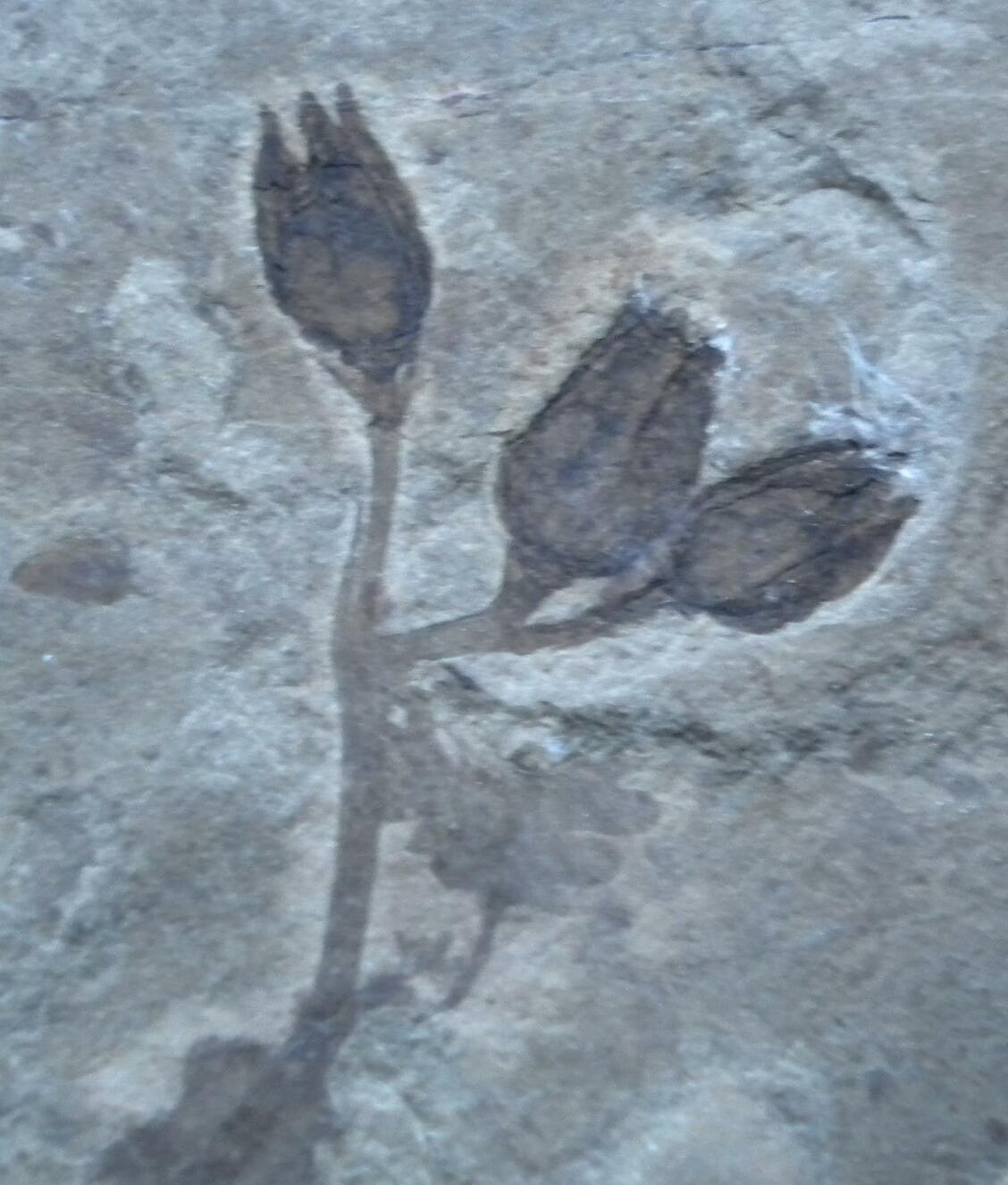
Adaptive radiation in the Cretaceous created many flowering plants, such as Sagaria in the Ranunculaceae.

Fossilised spores suggest that land plants (embryophytes) have existed for at least 475 million years. However, angiosperms appeared suddenly and rapidly diversified during the Early Cretaceous (beginning ~130 mya), much later than other major plant groups. Claimed records of flowering plants prior to this are not widely accepted, as all supposed pre-Cretaceous "flowers" can be explained through being misidentifications of other seed plants. Furthermore, almost all of these controversial fossils are described in papers co-authored by the researcher Xin Wang, such as the particularly debated Nanjinganthus. Molecular evidence suggests that the ancestors of angiosperms diverged from the gymnosperms during the late Devonian to early Carboniferous, around 371-338 million years ago. The origin time of the crown group of flowering plants remains contentious. By the Late Cretaceous, angiosperms appear to have dominated environments formerly occupied by ferns and gymnosperms. Large canopy-forming trees replaced conifers as the dominant trees close to the end of the Cretaceous, 66 million years ago. The radiation of herbaceous angiosperms occurred much later. Fossils from the Dakota Formation in Kansas suggest that beetles had already developed a symbiotic relationship with flowering plants such as Archaeanthus by the late-Albian.

== Reproduction ==
=== Flowers ===
Angiosperm flower showing reproductive parts and life cycle

The characteristic feature of angiosperms is the flower. Its function is to ensure fertilization of the ovule and development of fruit containing seeds. It may arise terminally on a shoot or from the axil of a leaf. The flower-bearing part of the plant is usually sharply distinguished from the leaf-bearing part, and forms a branch-system called an inflorescence.

Flowers produce two kinds of reproductive cells. Microspores, which divide to become pollen grains, are the male cells; they are borne in the stamens. The female cells, megaspores, divide to become the egg cell. They are contained in the ovule and enclosed in the carpel; one or more carpels form the pistil.

The flower may consist only of these parts, as in wind-pollinated plants like the willow, where each flower comprises only a few stamens or two carpels. In insect- or bird-pollinated plants, other structures protect the sporophylls and attract pollinators. The individual members of these surrounding structures are known as sepals and petals (or tepals in flowers such as Magnolia where sepals and petals are not distinguishable from each other). The outer series (calyx of sepals) is usually green and leaf-like, and functions to protect the rest of the flower, especially the bud. The inner series (corolla of petals) is, in general, white or brightly colored, is more delicate in structure, and attracts pollinators by colour, scent, and nectar.

Most flowers are hermaphroditic, producing both pollen and ovules in the same flower, but some use other devices to reduce self-fertilization. Heteromorphic flowers have carpels and stamens of differing lengths, so animal pollinators cannot easily transfer pollen between them. Homomorphic flowers may use a biochemical self-incompatibility to discriminate between self and non-self pollen grains. Dioecious plants such as holly have male and female flowers on separate plants. Monoecious plants have separate male and female flowers on the same plant; these are often wind-pollinated, as in maize, but include some insect-pollinated plants such as Cucurbita squashes.

=== Fertilisation and embryogenesis ===
Double fertilization requires two sperm cells to fertilise cells in the ovule. A pollen grain sticks to the stigma at the top of the pistil, germinates, and grows a long pollen tube. A haploid generative cell travels down the tube behind the tube nucleus. The generative cell divides by mitosis to produce two haploid (n) sperm cells. The pollen tube grows from the stigma, down the style and into the ovary. When it reaches the micropyle of the ovule, it digests its way into one of the synergids, releasing its contents including the sperm cells. The synergid that the cells were released into degenerates; one sperm makes its way to fertilise the egg cell, producing a diploid (2n) zygote. The second sperm cell fuses with both central cell nuclei, producing a triploid (3n) cell. The zygote develops into an embryo; the triploid cell develops into the endosperm, the embryo's food supply. The ovary develops into a fruit and each ovule into a seed.

=== Fruit and seed ===
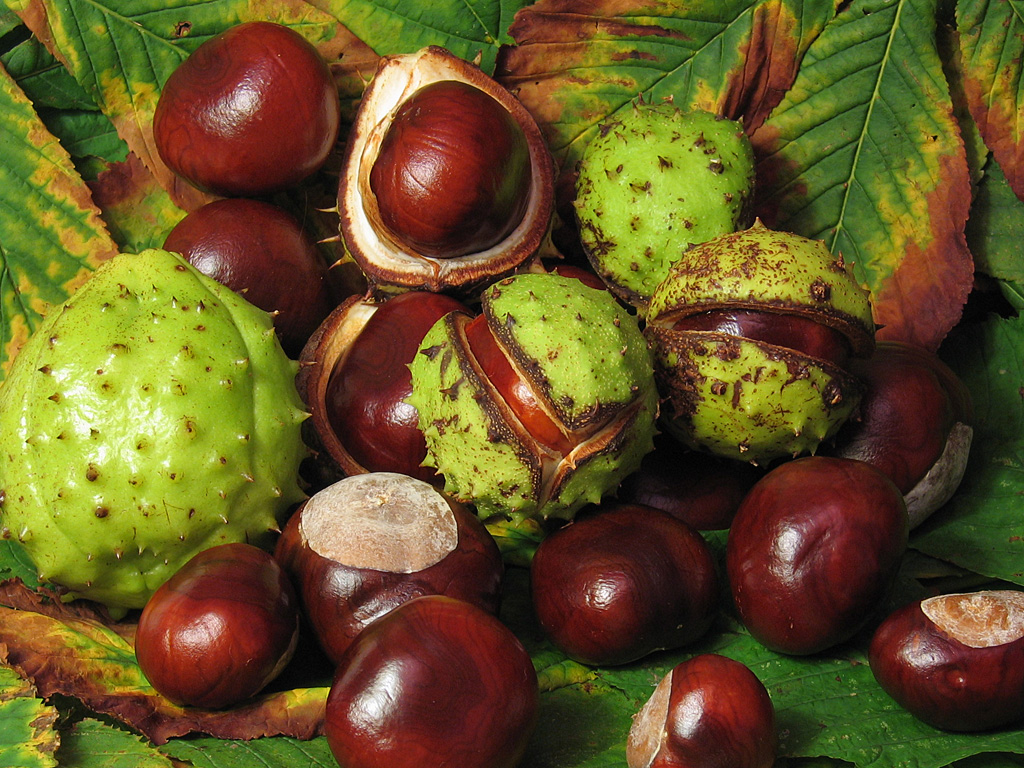
The fruit of the horse chestnut tree, showing the large seed inside the fruit, which is dehiscing or splitting open.

As the embryo and endosperm develop, the wall of the embryo sac enlarges and combines with the nucellus and integument to form the seed coat. The ovary wall develops to form the fruit or pericarp, whose form is closely associated with type of seed dispersal system.

Other parts of the flower often contribute to forming the fruit. For example, in the apple, the hypanthium forms the edible flesh, surrounding the ovaries which form the tough cases around the seeds.

Apomixis, setting seed without fertilization, is found naturally in about 2.2% of angiosperm genera. Some angiosperms, including many citrus varieties, are able to produce fruits through a type of apomixis called nucellar embryony.

=== Sexual selection ===
Sexual selection is a mechanism of evolution in which members of one sex choose mates of the other sex (inter-sexual selection), and compete with members of the same sex for access to members of the opposite sex (intra-sexual selection). It is an accepted concept in zoology, but more controversial in botany. It could work through two principal mechanisms:

- Intra-sexual (male–male) competition: Competing pollen donors vie for ovule fertilization via traits such as pollen packaging, timing of release, and flower morphology.
- Female or pistil-mediated mate choice: Post-pollination filters—such as pollen-recipient compatibility, pollen-tube growth rates, and selective seed abortion — enable differential siring success.

These two mechanisms are, in theory, the main driving forces of sexual selection in flowering plants and their potential relevance to botany is clear, but more complicated than in zoology. The complexity of applying the concept of sexual selection to plants arises from the facts that most plants are hermaphrodites and are non-sentient, meaning that the more obvious elements of female choice (e.g. aesthetic judgements on male secondary sexual characteristics) do not apply. The research challenge currently facing botanists is mainly empirical, namely how significant these processes have actually been in plant evolution.

=== Adaptive function of flowers ===
Charles Darwin in his 1878 book The Effects of Cross and Self-Fertilization in the Vegetable Kingdom in the initial paragraph of chapter XII noted "The first and most important of the conclusions which may be drawn from the observations given in this volume, is that generally cross-fertilisation is beneficial and self-fertilisation often injurious, at least with the plants on which I experimented." Flowers emerged in plant evolution as an adaptation for the promotion of cross-fertilisation (outcrossing), a process that allows the masking of deleterious mutations in the genome of progeny. The masking effect is known as genetic complementation. Meiosis in flowering plants provides a direct mechanism for repairing DNA through genetic recombination in reproductive tissues. Sexual reproduction appears to be required for maintaining long-term genomic integrity and only infrequent combinations of extrinsic and intrinsic factors permit shifts to asexuality. Thus the two fundamental aspects of sexual reproduction in flowering plants, cross-fertilization (outcrossing) and meiosis appear to be maintained respectively by the advantages of genetic complementation and recombinational repair.

== Human uses ==
=== Practical uses ===
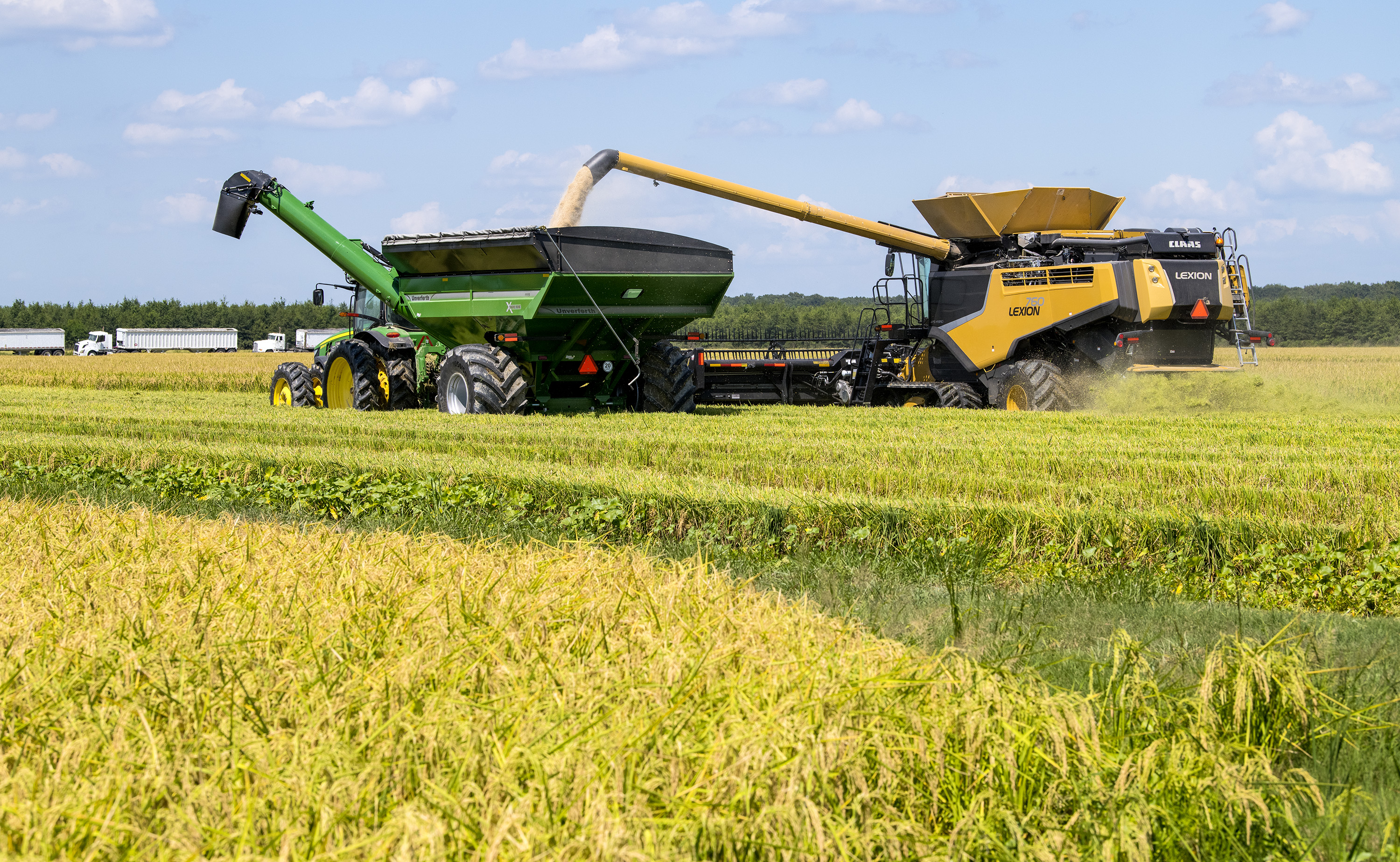
Harvesting rice in Arkansas, 2020

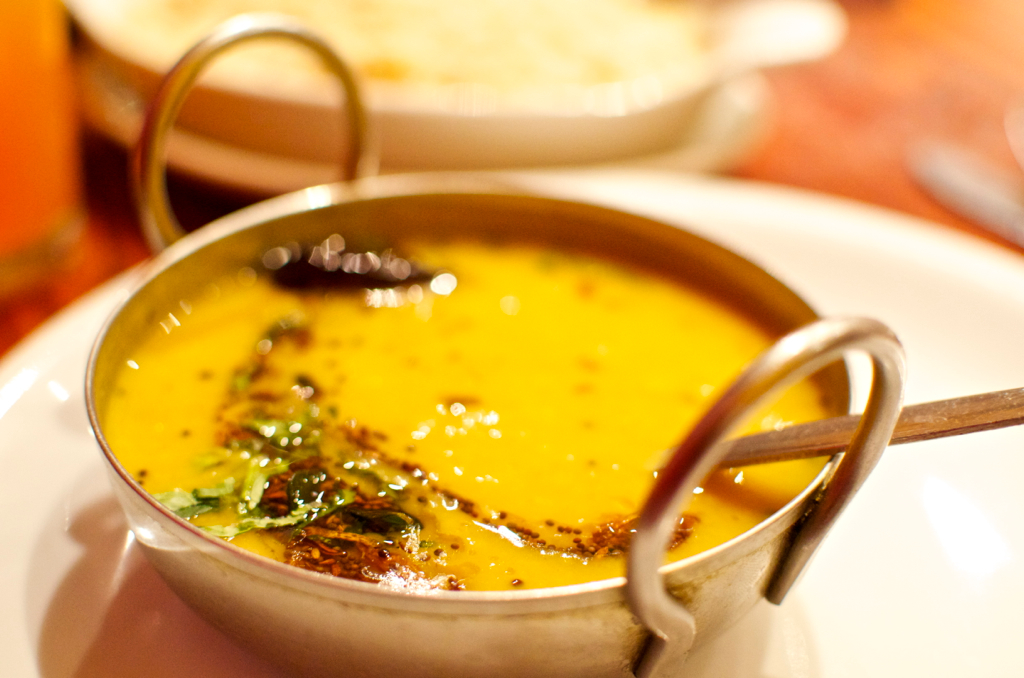
Food from plants: a dish of Dal tadka, Indian lentil soup

Agriculture is almost entirely dependent on angiosperms, which provide virtually all plant-based food and fodder for livestock. Much of this food derives from a small number of flowering plant families. For instance, half of the world's calorie intake is supplied by just three members of the Poaceae, the grass family – wheat, rice and maize.

Major food-providing families
Family	English	Example foods from that family
Poaceae	Grasses, cereals	Most feedstocks, inc. rice, maize, wheat, barley, rye, oats, pearl millet, sugar cane, sorghum
Fabaceae	Legumes, pea family	Peas, beans, lentils; for animal feed, clover, alfalfa
Solanaceae	Nightshade family	Potatoes, tomatoes, peppers, aubergines
Cucurbitaceae	Gourd family	Squashes, cucumbers, pumpkins, melons
Brassicaceae	Cabbage family	Cabbage and its varieties, e.g. Brussels sprout, broccoli; mustard; oilseed rape
Apiaceae	Parsley family	Parsnip, carrot, parsley, coriander, fennel, cumin, caraway
Rutaceae	Rue family	Oranges, lemons, grapefruits
Rosaceae	Rose family	Apples, pears, cherries, apricots, plums, peaches

Flowering plants provide a diverse range of materials in the form of wood, paper, fibers such as cotton, flax, and hemp, medicines such as digoxin and opioids, and decorative and landscaping plants. Coffee and hot chocolate are beverages from flowering plants (in the Rubiaceae and Malvaceae respectively).

=== Cultural uses ===
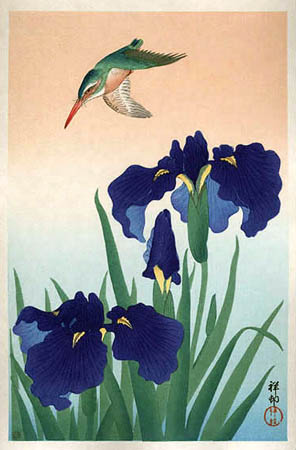
Bird-and-flower painting: Kingfisher and iris kachō-e woodblock print by Ohara Koson (late 19th century)

Both real and fictitious plants play a wide variety of roles in literature and film. Flowers are the subjects of many poems by poets such as William Blake, Robert Frost, and Rabindranath Tagore. Bird-and-flower painting (Huaniaohua) is a kind of Chinese painting that celebrates the beauty of flowering plants. Flowers have been used in literature to convey meaning by authors including William Shakespeare. Flowers are used in a variety of art forms which arrange cut or living plants, such as bonsai, ikebana, and flower arranging. Ornamental plants have sometimes changed the course of history, as in tulipomania. Many countries and regions have floral emblems; a survey of 70 of these found that the most popular flowering plant family for such emblems is Orchidaceae at 15.7% (11 emblems), followed by Fabaceae at 10% (7 emblems), and Asparagaceae, Asteraceae, and Rosaceae all at 5.7% (4 emblems each).

=== Conservation ===
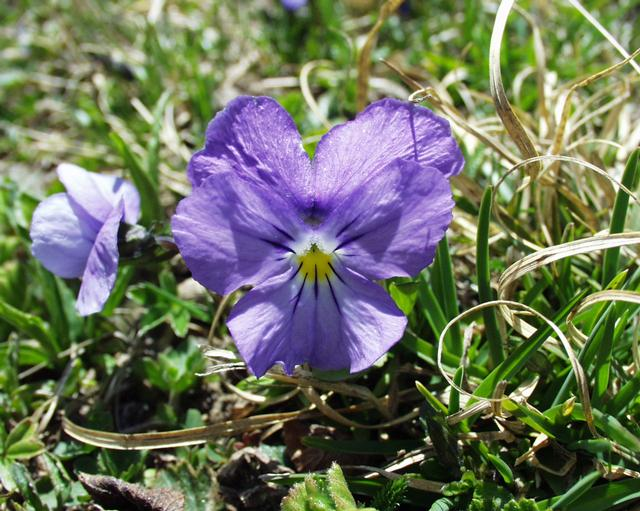
Viola calcarata, a species highly vulnerable to climate change.

Human impact on the environment has driven a range of species extinct and is threatening even more today. Multiple organizations such as IUCN and Royal Botanic Gardens, Kew suggest that around 40% of plant species are threatened with extinction. The majority are threatened by habitat loss, but activities such as logging of wild timber trees and collection of medicinal plants, or the introduction of non-native invasive species, also play a role.

Relatively few plant diversity assessments have considered climate change, yet it is starting to impact plants as well. About 3% of flowering plants are very likely to be driven extinct within a century at 2 °C (3.6 °F) of global warming, and 10% at 3.2 °C (5.8 °F). In worst-case scenarios, half of all tree species may be driven extinct by climate change over that timeframe.

Conservation in this context is the attempt to prevent extinction, whether in situ by protecting plants and their habitats in the wild, or ex situ in seed banks or as living plants. Some 3000 botanic gardens around the world maintain living plants, including over 40% of the species known to be threatened, as an "insurance policy against extinction in the wild." The United Nations' Global Strategy for Plant Conservation asserts that "without plants, there is no life". It aims to "halt the continuing loss of plant diversity" throughout the world.

== Bibliography ==
=== Articles, books and chapters ===
- This article incorporates text from a publication now in the public domain: Balfour, Isaac Bayley; Rendle, Alfred Barton (1911). "Angiosperms". In Chisholm, Hugh (ed.). Encyclopædia Britannica. Vol. 2 (11th ed.). Cambridge University Press. pp. 9–14.
- APG (2003). "An update of the Angiosperm Phylogeny Group classification for the orders and families of flowering plants: APG II". Botanical Journal of the Linnean Society. 141 (4): 399–436. doi:10.1046/j.1095-8339.2003.t01-1-00158.x.
- APG (2009). "An update of the Angiosperm Phylogeny Group classification for the orders and families of flowering plants: APG III". Botanical Journal of the Linnean Society. 161 (2): 105–121. doi:10.1111/j.1095-8339.2009.00996.x. hdl:10654/18083.
- APG (2016). "An update of the Angiosperm Phylogeny Group classification for the orders and families of flowering plants: APG IV". Botanical Journal of the Linnean Society. 181 (1): 1–20. doi:10.1111/boj.12385.
- Armbruster, W. Scott (2014). "Floral specialization and angiosperm diversity: phenotypic divergence, fitness trade-offs and realized pollination accuracy". AoB Plants. 6. doi:10.1093/aobpla/plu003. PMC 4038416. PMID 24790124.
- Becker, Kenneth M. (February 1973). "A Comparison of Angiosperm Classification Systems". Taxon. 22 (1): 19–50. Bibcode:1973Taxon..22...19B. doi:10.2307/1218032. JSTOR 1218032.
- Bell, Adrian D. (2008) [1991]. Plant Form. An Illustrated Guide to Flowering Plant Morphology. Portland, Oregon: Timber Press. ISBN 978-0-88192-850-1.
  - 1st edition published by Oxford University Press in 1991 ISBN 978-0-19854-219-3
- Bell, C.D.; Soltis, D.E.; Soltis, P.S. (2010). "The Age and Diversification of the Angiosperms Revisited". American Journal of Botany. 97 (8): 1296–1303. Bibcode:2010AmJB...97.1296B. doi:10.3732/ajb.0900346. PMID 21616882. S2CID 207613985.
- Chase, Mark W.; Reveal, James L. (2009). "A phylogenetic classification of the land plants to accompany APG III". Botanical Journal of the Linnean Society. 161 (2): 122–127. doi:10.1111/j.1095-8339.2009.01002.x.
- De Craene, Ronse; P., Louis (2010). Floral Diagrams. Cambridge: Cambridge University Press. doi:10.1017/cbo9780511806711. ISBN 978-0-511-80671-1.
- Cromie, William J. (16 December 1999). "Oldest Known Flowering Plants Identified By Genes". Harvard University Gazette.
- Cronquist, Arthur (October 1960). "The divisions and classes of plants". The Botanical Review. 26 (4): 425–482. Bibcode:1960BotRv..26..425C. doi:10.1007/BF02940572. S2CID 43144314.
- Cronquist, Arthur (1981). An Integrated System of Classification of Flowering Plants. New York: Columbia Univ. Press. ISBN 978-0-231-03880-5.
- Dahlgren, R. M. T. (February 1980). "A revised system of classification of the angiosperms". Botanical Journal of the Linnean Society. 80 (2): 91–124. doi:10.1111/j.1095-8339.1980.tb01661.x.
- Dahlgren, Rolf (February 1983). "General aspects of angiosperm evolution and macrosystematics". Nordic Journal of Botany. 3 (1): 119–149. Bibcode:1983NorJB...3..119D. doi:10.1111/j.1756-1051.1983.tb01448.x.
- Dilcher, D. (2000). "Toward a new synthesis: Major evolutionary trends in the angiosperm fossil record". Proceedings of the National Academy of Sciences. 97 (13): 7030–7036. Bibcode:2000PNAS...97.7030D. doi:10.1073/pnas.97.13.7030. PMC 34380. PMID 10860967.
- Heywood, V. H.; Brummitt, R. K.; Culham, A.; Seberg, O. (2007). Flowering Plant Families of the World. Richmond Hill, Ontario, Canada: Firefly Books. ISBN 978-1-55407-206-4.
- Hill, Christopher; Crane, Peter (January 1982). "Evolutionary Cladistics and the origin of Angiosperms". In Joysey, Kenneth Alan; Friday, A.E. (eds.). Problems of Phylogenetic Reconstruction. Special Volumes. Vol. 21. London: Systematics Association. pp. 269–361. ISBN 978-0-12-391250-3.
- Lersten, Nels R. (2004). Flowering plant embryology with emphasis on economic species. Ames, Iowa: Blackwell Pub. ISBN 978-0-470-75267-8.
- D. Mauseth, James (2016). Botany: An Introduction to Plant Biology (6th ed.). Jones & Bartlett Learning. ISBN 978-1-284-07753-7.
- Pooja (2004). Angiosperms. New Delhi: Discovery. ISBN 978-81-7141-788-9.
- Raven, P.H.; Evert, R.F.; Eichhorn, S.E. (2004). Biology of Plants (7th ed.). W.H. Freeman.
- Sattler, R. (1973). Organogenesis of Flowers. A Photographic Text-Atlas. University of Toronto Press.
- Simpson, Michael G. (2010). Plant Systematics (2nd ed.). Academic Press. ISBN 978-0-08-092208-9.
- Soltis, Pamela S; Soltis, Douglas E (April 2016). "Ancient WGD events as drivers of key innovations in angiosperms". Current Opinion in Plant Biology. 30: 159–165. Bibcode:2016COPB...30..159S. doi:10.1016/j.pbi.2016.03.015. PMID 27064530.
- Takhtajan, A. (June 1964). "The Taxa of the Higher Plants above the Rank of Order". Taxon. 13 (5): 160–164. Bibcode:1964Taxon..13..160T. doi:10.2307/1216134. JSTOR 1216134.
- Takhtajan, A. (July–September 1980). "Outline of the Classification of Flowering Plants (Magnoliophyta)". Botanical Review. 46 (3): 225–359. Bibcode:1980BotRv..46..225T. doi:10.1007/bf02861558. JSTOR 4353970. S2CID 30764910.
- Zeng, Liping; Zhang, Qiang; Sun, Renran; Kong, Hongzhi; Zhang, Ning; Ma, Hong (24 September 2014). "Resolution of deep angiosperm phylogeny using conserved nuclear genes and estimates of early divergence times". Nature Communications. 5 (4956): 4956. Bibcode:2014NatCo...5.4956Z. doi:10.1038/ncomms5956. PMC 4200517. PMID 25249442.

=== Websites ===
- Cole, Theodor C.H.; Hilger, Harmut H.; Stevens, Peter F. (2017). "Angiosperm Phylogeny Poster – Flowering Plant Systematics" (PDF).
- Watson, L.; Dallwitz, M.J. (1992). "The Families of Flowering Plants: Descriptions, Illustrations, Identification, and Information Retrieval". 14 December 2000. Archived from the original on 2 August 2014.
- "Flowering plant". The Encyclopedia of Life.
