= Current Opinion in Cell Biology =

- Discipline: Molecular biology, cellular biology
- Language: English
- Edited by: Tom Mistley, Anne Ridley

Publication details
- Publisher: Elsevier
- Impact factor: 8.233 (2018)

Standard abbreviations
- ISO 4: Curr. Opin. Cell Biol.

Indexing
- ISSN: 0955-0674 (print); 1879-0410 (web)

Links
- Journal homepage

Current Opinion in Cell Biology is a bimonthly peer-reviewed scientific journal published by Elsevier covering all aspects of cell biology including genetics, cell communication, and metabolism. It was established in 1998 and is part of the Elsevier Current Opinion series of journals. The editors-in-chief are Tom Mistley (National Institutes of Health) and Anne Ridley.

The journal has a 2018 impact factor of 8.233.
