= Gates Open Research =

Scientific journal

- Discipline: computer technology, medical sciences, multidisciplinary
- Language: English

Publication details
- History: 2017–present
- Publisher: Bill & Melinda Gates Foundation, F1000
- Frequency: Continuous
- Open access: Yes

Standard abbreviations
- ISO 4: Gates Open Res.

Indexing
- ISSN: 2572-4754

Links
- Journal homepage

Gates Open Research is a peer-reviewed open access scientific journal exclusively for research funded by the Bill & Melinda Gates Foundation. It was established in 2017. The journal is listed in the Directory of Open Access Journals.

== Background ==
Gates Open Research serves as a research publishing platform with financial support from the Bill and Melinda Gates Foundation. It publishes original research articles on all topics so long as they have been funded by the foundation. In addition, it hosts posters, slides and documents, such as grant reports. Open science publishing may increase visibility and maximize the societal impact of the research.

It enables researchers to disseminate their findings, ranging from conventional research articles, research and innovation ideas, to data, research insights and software tool insights.

The platform provides open published peer review and editorial support in-house. Moreover, it facilitates indexation in databases like PubMed and Scopus.

== History ==
Gates Open Research was created to promote open access to Gates foundation funded research.

== Abstracting and indexing ==
The journal is abstracted and indexed in:

- Web of Science
- PubMed Central
- Inspec
- Science Citation Index Expanded
- Scopus

== See also ==
- Open-access (publishing)
- Open peer review
