= F1000 (publisher) =

Academic publisher

- Parent company: Taylor & Francis Group
- Founded: 2000
- Founder: Vitek Tracz
- Country of origin: United Kingdom
- Headquarters location: London
- Distribution: Worldwide
- Key people: Rebecca Lawrence (Managing Director)
- Publication types: Reviews, scientific articles, posters, slides
- Nonfiction topics: Science
- Official website: f1000.com

F1000 (formerly "Faculty of 1000") is an open research publisher for scientists, scholars, and clinical researchers. F1000 offers a different research evaluation service from standard academic journals by offering peer-review after, rather than before, publishing a research article. Initially, F1000 was named after the 1,000 faculty members who performed peer-reviews, but over time F1000 expanded to more than 8,000 members. When F1000 was acquired by Taylor & Francis Group in January 2020, it kept the publishing services. F1000Prime (AKA Faculty Opinions) and F1000 Workspace (AKA Sciwheel) were acquired by different brands.

== History ==
Faculty of 1000 was founded in 2000 by publishing entrepreneur Vitek Tracz in London. Initially, it was named after the 1,000 experts it had reviewing academic works, but over time F1000 expanded to more than 8,000 members. In 2002, it introduced F1000Prime (later known as Faculty Opinions), which recommended scientific articles selected by its experts. At first, F1000 was focused on biology, but later expanded to additional scientific fields over time, including a focus on medicine beginning in 2006.

The company was part of the Science Navigation Group until its acquisition by Taylor & Francis in January 2020. As part of the deal, founder Vitek Tracz remained the owner of Prime and Workspace, leaving the new F1000 (and F1000Research) owned by Taylor & Francis. Faculty Opinions (F1000Prime) was later acquired by a tech company called H1 in February 2022. F1000 now only provides publishing and related services.

== Services ==
F1000 is an open research publisher for academic works. Its model focuses on publishing findings quickly using a post-publication peer-review system. Authors submit an article and all of its underlying data. F1000 does a prepublication check and publishes the article, usually within a couple weeks. After the article is published, an expert is assigned to conduct a peer-review of the work. The peer-review is done publicly, online, and on an ongoing basis. The expert conducting the peer review discloses their name and any vested interests, abandoning the double-blind, anonymous peer-review system that is typical in academic publishing. Additionally, other organizations like the Bill & Melinda Gates Foundation (platform Gates Open Research) and the European Commission (platform Open Research Europe) contract out the development and support of their own open-access publishing systems to F1000.

It publishes articles and "collections" of other research content such as presentations. Users can filter articles to see only those that have passed peer review. In January 2020, the publisher Taylor & Francis bought F1000Research.

=== Previous services ===
F1000 used to operate Faculty Opinions, formerly known as F1000Prime, until F1000 was acquired by Taylor & Francis in 2020. The founder of F1000 remained the owner of Prime, which he subsequently sold to tech company H1 in February 2022. Faculty Opinions drew attention to scientific works that are well-rated by F1000's experts. The Faculty Opinions ranking system further provided an alternative article highlighting system from the use of article impact metrics like total citation count. Faculty Opinions experts nominated primary research papers they felt were important or interesting, wrote a description of the work's significance, then linked to where the work was originally published. This helped pinpoint papers.

No new expert articles recommendations have been added to H1Connect. Previous evaluations are listed as archived (see H1). It appears the evaluation and recommendation service has been discontinued.

Sciwheel, formerly F1000Workspace, was a citation manager platform previously operated by F1000. SciWheel also offered article recommendations based on a user's existing reference library. After the acquisition, it was owned by F1000 founder Vitek Tracz, before being acquired by SAGE Publishing in 2022.

== See also ==
- Open peer review
- Open access
