= Current Opinion In Food Science =

Current Opinion in Food Science
- Discipline: Food science
- Language: English
- Edited by: A.G. Marangoni, A. Sant'Ana

Publication details
- History: 2015–present
- Publisher: Elsevier
- Frequency: Bimonthly
- Impact factor: 6.031 (2020)

Standard abbreviations
- ISO 4: Curr. Opin. Food Sci.

Indexing
- ISSN: 2214-7993 (print); 2214-8000 (web)

Links
- Journal homepage; Online access

Current Opinion in Food Science is a peer-reviewed scientific journal published by Elsevier. It covers the field of food Science and nutrition, and is divided into themed sections. The journal was established in 2015 as part of Elsevier's Current Opinion series, which is a collection of journals publishing invited reviews aimed at experts and non-specialists on various disciplines. The current editors-in-chief are A.G. Marangoni (University of Guelph) and A. Sant'Ana (State University of Campinas).

== Abstracting and Indexing ==
The journal is abstracted and indexed in Science Citation Index Expanded, Current Contents/Agriculture, Biology & Environmental Sciences, Essential science indicators, and Scopus. According to the Journal Citation Reports, the journal has a 2018 impact factor of 3.828

== See also ==
- Current Opinion (Elsevier)
- Food science
