= Vitek Tracz =

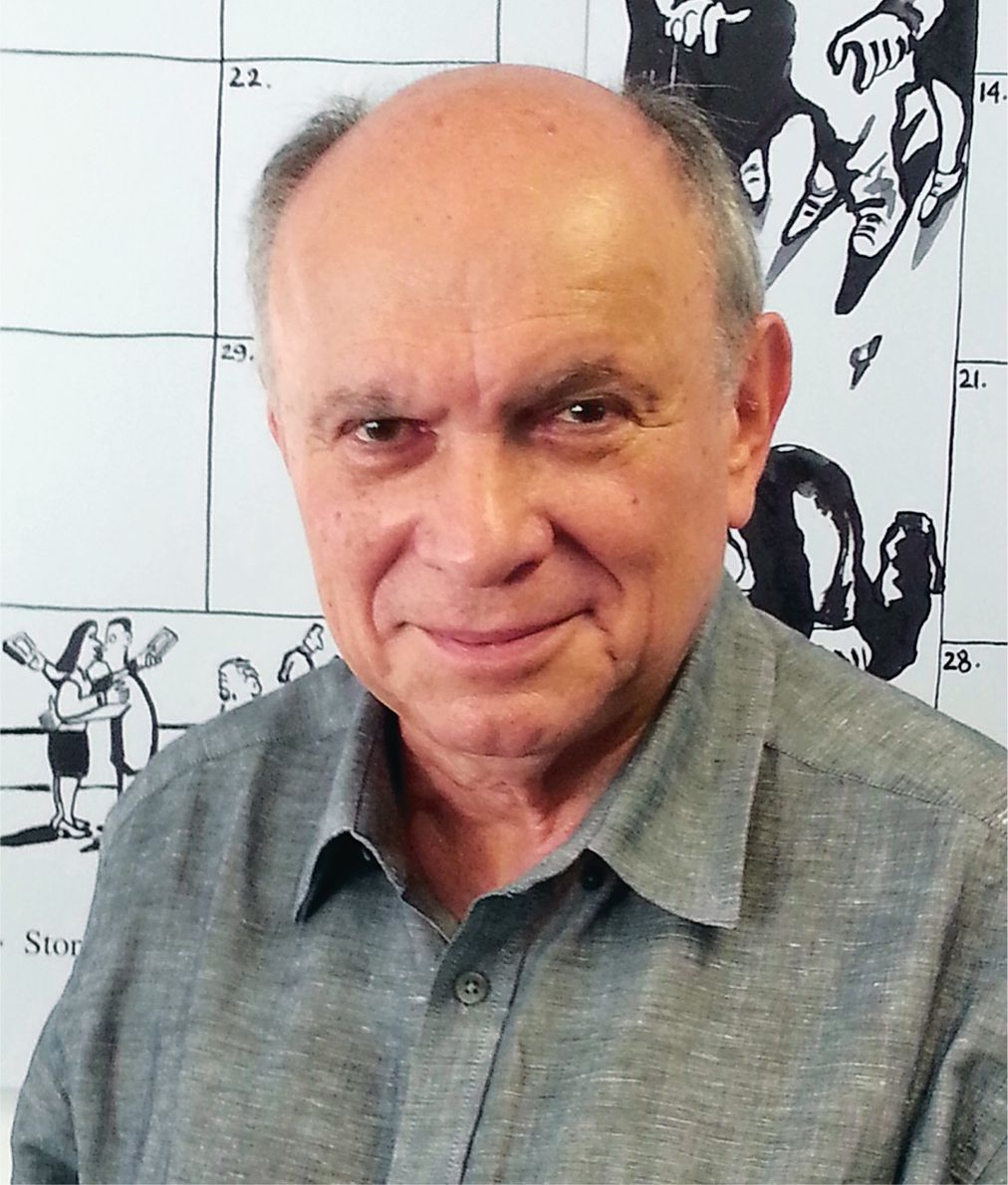
- Vitek Tracz, London-based publishing entrepreneur.
- Born: 31 May 1940 (age 84); Poland
- Occupation: Chairman of Sciencenow Group
- Known for: Founding Current Opinion journals, Current Biology, BioMedNet, BioMed Central, Faculty of 1000, Current Drugs, Telmap
- Spouse: Dalia Tracz
- Website: blog.f1000.com/author/vitek-tracz/

Vitek Tracz (born 31 May 1940) is a London-based entrepreneur who has been involved in science publishing, pharmaceutical information and mobile phone-based navigation.

== Early life ==
Tracz was born in 1940 in Poland. He studied mathematics in Warsaw and Jerusalem, before studying film-making at the Slade School of Fine Art. He collaborated with Israeli writer Hanoch Levin on the 1978 feature film Fantasia Al Noseh Romanti.

== Business career ==
In academic publishing, Tracz is known as the founder of the Current Opinion journals (which, along with the research journal Current Biology and the early scientific community websites BioMedNet and Chemweb, were acquired by Elsevier in 1997), and open access publisher BioMed Central (acquired by Springer Science+Business Media in 2008).

In 2004, Tracz was invited to give oral evidence to the House of Commons Science & Technology Committee as part of its inquiry into scientific publishing and open access.

Tracz's group of companies, currently known as the Sciencenow Group (formerly Science Navigation Group), previously published The Scientist (a popular science magazine with all print and web content freely available online), and currently publishes Faculty of 1000 (a subscription-only current awareness service highlighting recent biological and medical research). Other companies that have been part of the group in the past include Current Medicine, a publisher medical books, journals, websites and the Images.MD medical image database (both acquired by Springer in 2005), Current Biology and the Current Opinion journals (acquired by Elsevier), and Global DataPoint. Other businesses founded by Tracz include Current Drugs (acquired by Thomson Corporation in 2002), and Telmap, a mobile phone navigation company (acquired by Intel in 2012).

In recent years, Tracz's business has focused on activities under the Faculty of 1000/F1000 brand. Faculty of 1000 began as a literature evaluation service, but more recently allowed the publication of original scientific posters (F1000 Posters) and research articles (F1000 Research). F1000 has generated some controversy with its use of an innovative and rapid form of peer review. In January 2020, F1000 Research was acquired by Taylor & Francis Group, an Informa Company. Sciencenow Group continues to offer the literature evaluation service, now branded Faculty Opinions, alongside Sciwheel, a reference management solution.

Sciencenow Group is also responsible for Web of Stories, a collection of multi-hour video interviews with leading scientists and other major cultural figures, looking back at their career and work. Each video is divided into short segments which are connected together to create a "web of stories", showing differing perspectives on major themes such as the Manhattan Project.

Tracz remains chairman of Sciencenow Group, which acts as an incubator for his new businesses. Tracz's businesses have been largely self-funded, without external investment.

Tracz has a reputation as an innovator in a tradition-bound industry, being described by Richard Smith (former editor of the BMJ) as 'the Picasso of science publishing'.

== Interests ==
Tracz is an art collector, with a focus on Expressionism.
