= Current Opinion (Elsevier) =

Journal collection

- Parent company: Elsevier
- Founded: 1990
- Founder: Vitek Tracz
- Publication types: Scientific journals
- Official website: current-opinion.com

Current Opinion is a collection of review journals on various disciplines of the life sciences. They were acquired by Elsevier in 1997. Each issue of each journal, which all are published bimonthly, contains one or more themed sections edited by scientists who specialise in the field and invite authors to contribute reviews aimed at experts and non-specialists. Each journal aims to cover all the major recent advances in its topic area, and to direct readers to the most important original research.

== Journals ==
Title	ISSN	Established
Current Opinion in Behavioral Sciences	2352-1546	2014
Current Opinion in Biomedical Engineering	2468-4511	2017
Current Opinion in Biotechnology	0958-1669	1990
Current Opinion in Cell Biology	0955-0674	1989
Current Opinion in Chemical Biology	1367-5931	1997
Current Opinion in Chemical Engineering	2211-3398	2011
Current Opinion in Colloid and Interface Science	1359-0294	1996
Current Opinion in Development	0959-437X	1991
Current Opinion in Electrochemistry	2451-9103	2017
Current Opinion in Endocrine and Metabolic Research	2451-9650	2018
Current Opinion in Environmental Science & Health	2468-5844	2018
Current Opinion in Environmental Sustainability	1877-3435	2009
Current Opinion in Food Science	2214-7993	2015
Current Opinion in Genetics & Development	0959-437X	1991
Current Opinion in Green and Sustainable Chemistry	2452-2236	2016
Current Opinion in Immunology	0952-7915	1988
Current Opinion in Insect Science	2214-5745	2014
Current Opinion in Microbiology	1369-5274	1998
Current Opinion in Neurobiology	0959-4388	1991
Current Opinion in Pharmacology	1471-4892	2001
Current Opinion in Physiology	2468-8673	2018
Current Opinion in Plant Biology	1369-5266	1998
Current Opinion in Psychology	2352-250X	2015
Current Opinion in Solid State and Materials Science	1359-0286	1996
Current Opinion in Structural Biology	0959-440X	1991
Current Opinion in Systems Biology	2452-3100	2017
Current Opinion in Toxicology	2468-2020	2016
Current Opinion in Virology	1879-6257	2011

== See also ==
- Current Opinion (Lippincott Williams & Wilkins)
