= Megagametogenesis =

Process of formation of megaspore mother cell (MMC) is called megasporogenesis

Megagametogenesis is the process of maturation of the female gametophyte, or megagametophyte, in plants. During the process of megagametogenesis, the megaspore, which arises from megasporogenesis, develops into the embryonic sac, in which the female gamete is housed. These megaspores then develop into the haploid female gametophytes. This occurs within the ovule, which is housed inside the ovary.

== Process ==
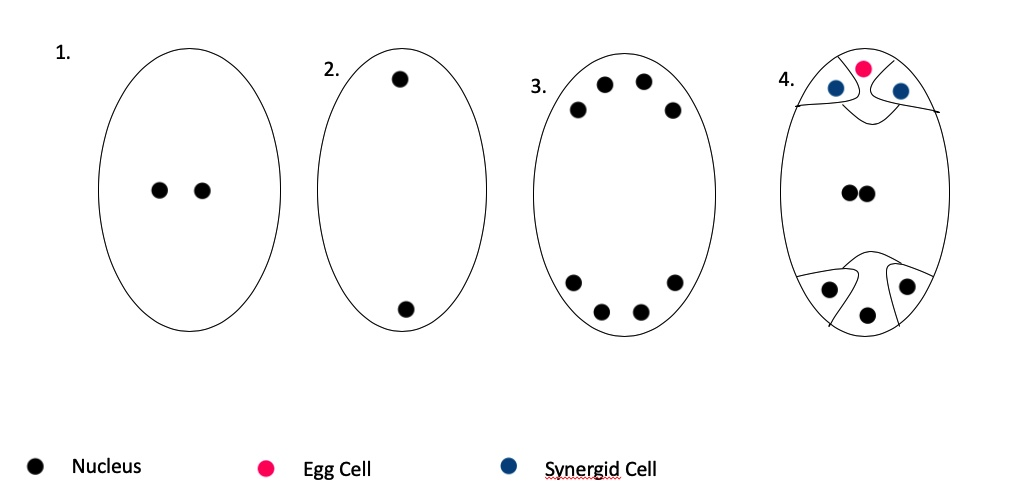
Refer to the figure above to observe the process of megagametogenesis, which is detailed below.

Prior to megagametogenesis, a developing embryo undergoes meiosis during a process called megasporogenesis. Next, three out of four megaspores disintegrate, leaving only the megaspore that will undergo the megagametogenesis. The following steps are shown in Figure 1, and detailed below.

1. The remaining megaspore undergoes a round of mitosis. This results in a structure with two nuclei, also called a binucleate embryonic sac.
2. The two nuclei migrate to opposite sides of the embryonic sac.
3. Each haploid nucleus then undergoes two rounds of mitosis which creates 4 haploid nuclei on each end of the embryonic sac.
4. One nucleus from each set of 4 migrates to the center of the embryonic sac. These form the binucleate endosperm mother cell. This leaves three remaining nuclei on the micropylar end and three remaining nuclei on the antipodal end. The nuclei on the micropylar end are composed of an egg cell, two synergid cells, and the micropyle, an opening that allows the pollen tube to enter the structure. The nuclei on the antipodal end are simply known as the antipodal cells. These cells are involved with nourishing the embryo, but often undergo programmed cell death before fertilization occurs.
5. Cell plates form around the antipodal nuclei, egg cell, and synergid cells.

== Variations ==
Plants exhibit three main types of megagametogenesis. The number of haploid nuclei in the functional megaspore that is involved in megagametogenesis is the main difference between these three types.

=== Monosporic ===
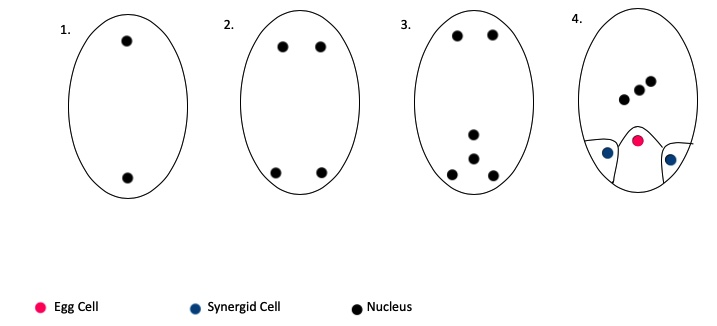
Bisporic megagametogenesis is shown in the figure and outlined below.

The most common type of megagametogenesis, monosporic megagametogenesis, is outlined above. This type of megagemetogenesis only allows one megaspore to undergo megagametogenesis, while the other three undergo programmed cell death.

=== Bisporic ===
As the name implies, bisporic megagametogenesis involves two genetically different haploid nuclei.

1. These two nuclei undergo a round of mitosis.
2. Then, the nuclei on the micropylar end of the structure undergo a second round of mitosis.
3. Next, the nuclei rearrange to form a trinucleate endosperm mother cell and the characteristic arrangement of the micropylar end, with an egg cell and two synergid cells.
4. Cell plates form around the egg cell and synergid cells.

== Eudicots ==
In eudicot plants, the entire process happens inside the ovule of a plant. The details of the process vary by species, but the process described here is common. This process starts with a single diploid megasporocyte in the nucleus. This megasporocyte undergoes meiotic cell division to form four cells that are haploid. Three cells die and one that is most distant from the micropyle develops into the megaspore. This megaspore becomes larger and the nucleus of it undergoes mitosis three times until there are eight nuclei. These eight nuclei are then arranged into two groups of four. These groups both send a nucleus to the center of the cell which then becomes the polar nuclei. The three cells left at the end of the cell near the micropylar become the egg apparatus with an egg cell in the center and two synergids. A cell wall forms around the other set of nuclei and forms the antipodals. The cells in the center develop into the central cell. This entire structure with its eight nuclei is called the embryonic sac.

== Post-megagametogenesis ==
Megagametogenesis creates the female gametophyte, which is an integral part of pollination, a very prominent process in plants. The male counterpart to megagametogenesis is called microgametogenesis. Microgametogenesis is the process of the formation of the male gametophyte. During pollination, the female gametophyte communicates with the pollen tube to ensure that it comes in contact with the ovule. When contact is made, the pollen tube grows through the micropyle opening into a synergid cell, that dies when this occurs. The death of the synergid cell signals to the pollen tube to release the sperm. This process creates the embryo, seed coat, and endosperm which, after pollination, will become crucial parts of the seed.

== Implications ==
Pollination is an essential process of global crop production. Its success is economically crucial for farmers. Additionally, pollination success is required for global food security. Cereals, or the seeds of grain crops, are most important staple food to humans around the world. They make up 48% of the calories consumed by humans.

== See also ==
- Megaspore — it is the female part of the flower in which seeds are formed. it consists of 7 parts: funicle, hilam, integuments, micropyle, chalaza, nucellus, embryosac
- Microspore — it is the male part of the flower in which pollen grains are stored.
- Gametophyte
