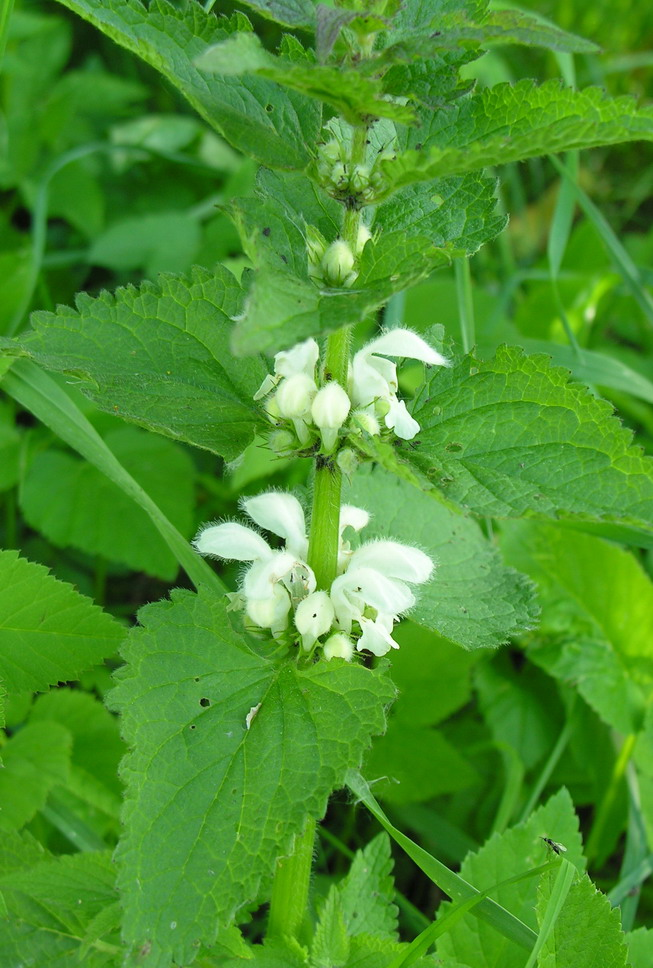
- Lamium album (white dead nettle)

Scientific classification
- Kingdom: Plantae
- Clade: Tracheophytes
- Clade: Spermatophytes
- Clade: Angiosperms

Groups included
- Eudicots; Magnoliids; Amborella; Nymphaeales; Austrobaileyales; Chloranthales; Ceratophyllum

Cladistically included but traditionally excluded taxa
- Monocots

Synonyms
- Dicotyledoneae; Magnoliatae Takht.

= Dicotyledon =

Historical grouping of flowering plants

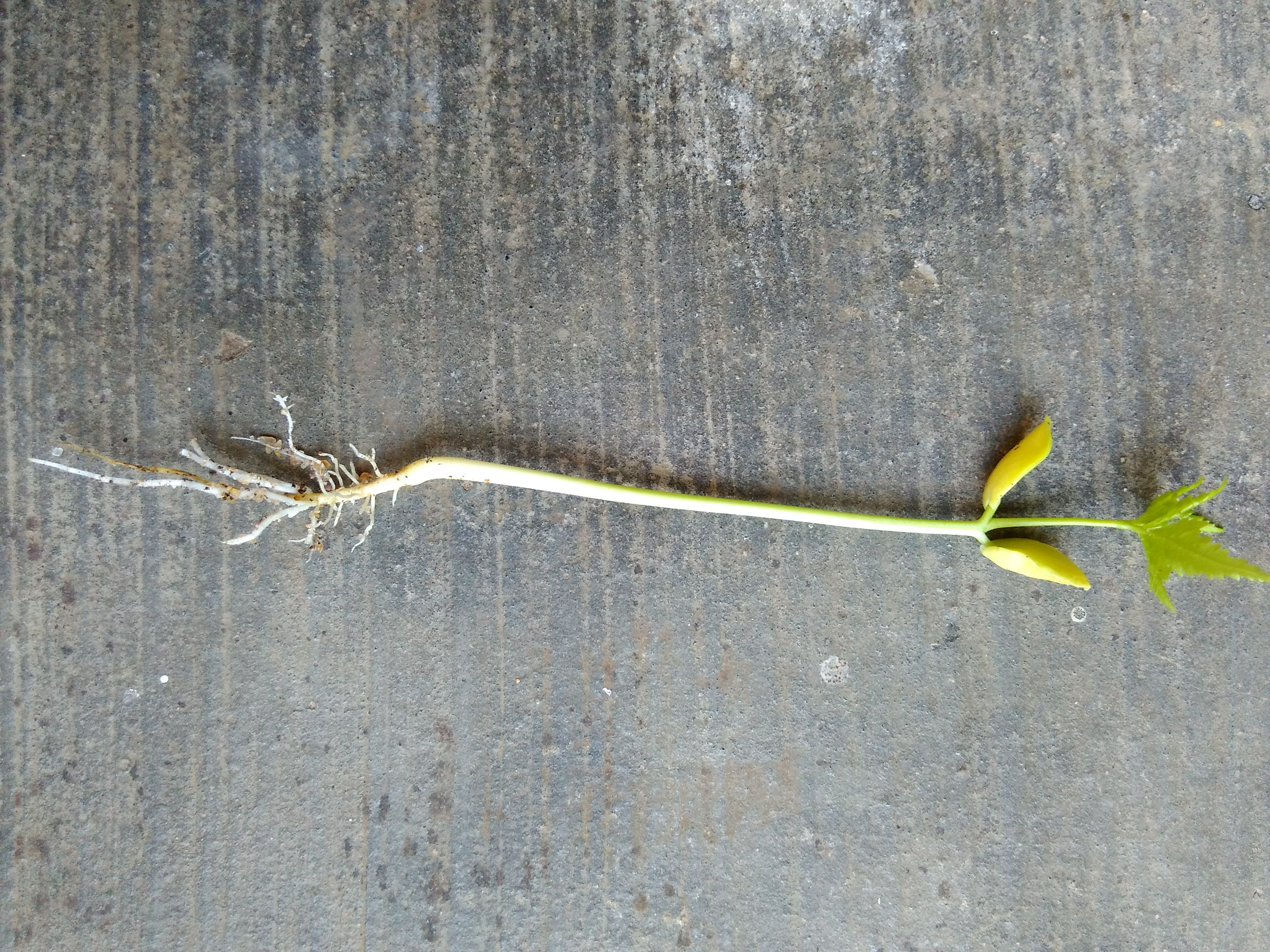
Dicotyledon plantlet

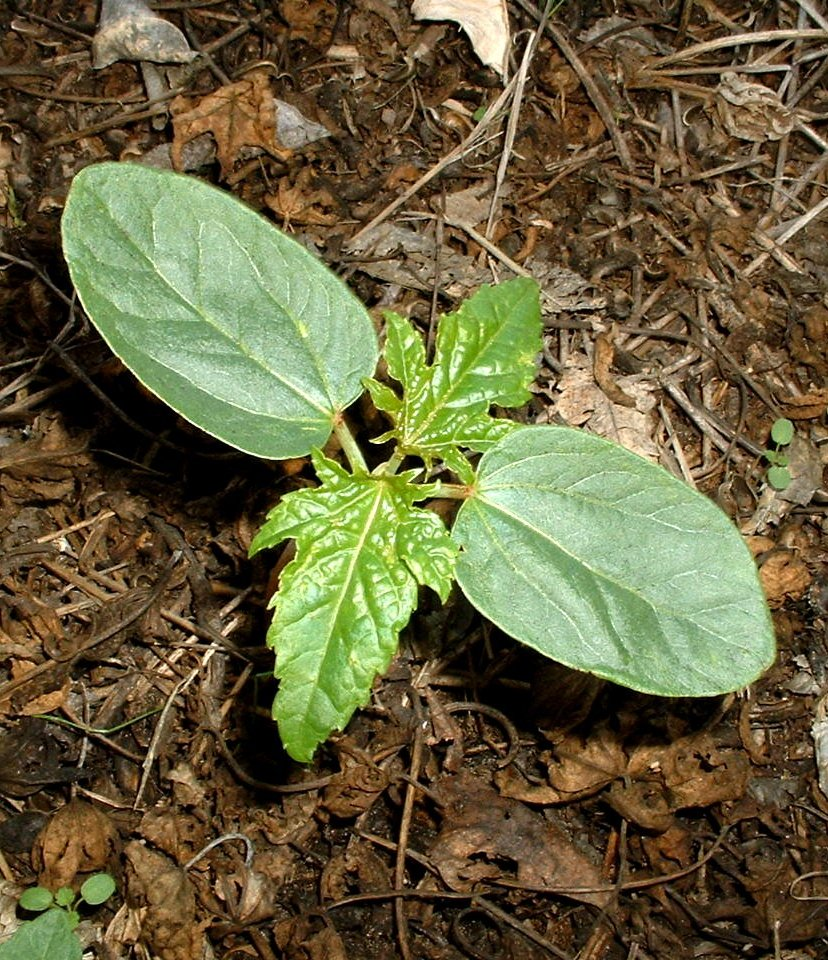
Young castor oil plant showing its prominent two embryonic leaves (cotyledons), which differ from the adult leaves

The dicotyledons, also known as dicots (or, more rarely, dicotyls), are one of the two groups into which all the flowering plants (angiosperms) were formerly divided. The name refers to one of the typical characteristics of the group: namely, that the seed has two embryonic leaves or cotyledons. There are around 200,000 species within this group. The other group of flowering plants were called monocotyledons (or monocots), typically each having one cotyledon. Historically, these two groups formed the two divisions of the flowering plants.

Largely from the 1990s onwards, molecular phylogenetic research confirmed what had already been suspected: that dicotyledons are not a group made up of all the descendants of a common ancestor (i.e., they are not a monophyletic group). Rather, a number of lineages, such as the magnoliids and groups now collectively known as the basal angiosperms, diverged earlier than the monocots did; in other words, monocots evolved from within the dicots, as traditionally defined. The traditional dicots are thus a paraphyletic group.

The eudicots are the largest monophyletic group within the dicotyledons. They are distinguished from all other flowering plants by the structure of their pollen. Other dicotyledons and the monocotyledons have monosulcate pollen (or derived forms): grains with a single sulcus. Contrastingly, eudicots have tricolpate pollen (or derived forms): grains with three or more pores set in furrows called colpi.

== Comparison with monocotyledons ==
Aside from cotyledon number, other broad differences have been noted between monocots and dicots, although these have proven to be differences primarily between monocots and eudicots. Many early-diverging dicot groups have monocot characteristics such as scattered vascular bundles, trimerous flowers, and non-tricolpate pollen. In addition, some monocots have dicot characteristics such as reticulated leaf veins.

Feature	In monocots	In dicots
Number of parts of each flower	In threes (flowers are trimerous)	In fours or fives (tetramerous or pentamerous)
Number of furrows or pores in pollen	One	Three
Number of cotyledons (leaves in the seed)	One (Many orchids are acotyledonous, with none).	Two (Some exceptions, including Psittacanthus schiedeanus with twelve.)
Arrangement of vascular bundles in the stem	Scattered	In concentric circles
Roots	Are adventitious	Develop from the radicle
Arrangement of major leaf veins	Parallel	Reticulate
Secondary growth	Absent	Often present
Stomata	Present on both the upper and lower epidermis of leaves	More common on the lower epidermis of leaves

Comparison of monocots and dicots

== Classification ==
=== Phylogeny ===
The consensus phylogenetic tree used in the APG IV system shows that the group traditionally treated as the dicots is paraphyletic to the monocots:

- angiosperms
  - Amborellales
  - - Nymphaeales
    - - Austrobaileyales
      - core angiosperms
        - Chloranthales
        - magnoliids
        - - - Ceratophyllales
            - eudicots
          - monocots

=== Historical ===
Traditionally, the dicots have been called the Dicotyledones (or Dicotyledoneae), at any rank. If treated as a class, as they are within the Cronquist system, they could be called the Magnoliopsida after the type genus Magnolia. In some schemes, the eudicots were either treated as a separate class, the Rosopsida (type genus Rosa), or as several separate classes. The remaining dicots (palaeodicots or basal angiosperms) may be kept in a single paraphyletic class, called Magnoliopsida, or further divided. Some botanists prefer to retain the dicotyledons as a valid class, arguing its practicality and that it makes evolutionary sense.

=== APG vs. Cronquist ===
The following lists show the orders in the Angiosperm Phylogeny Group APG IV system traditionally called dicots, together with the older Cronquist system.

APG IV (paraphyletic)	Cronquist system (classis Magnoliopsida)
Amborellales; Austrobaileyales; Nymphaeales; magnoliids: Canellales; Laurales; Magnoliales; Piperales; unplaced independent lineage: Chloranthales; probable sister of eudicots: Ceratophyllales; eudicots: Buxales; Proteales; Ranunculales; Trochodendrales; core eudicots: Dilleniales; Gunnerales; superrosids: Brassicales; Celastrales; Crossosomatales; Cucurbitales; Fabales; Fagales; Geraniales; Huerteales; Malpighiales; Malvales; Myrtales; Oxalidales; Picramniales; Rosales; Sapindales; Saxifragales; Vitales; Zygophyllales; superasterids: Apiales; Aquifoliales; Asterales; Berberidopsidales; Boraginales; Bruniales; Caryophyllales; Cornales; Dipsacales; Ericales; Escalloniales; Garryales; Gentianales; Icacinales; Lamiales; Metteniusales; Paracryphiales; Santalales; Solanales; Vahliales	Magnoliidae (mostly basal dicots): Magnoliales; Laurales; Piperales; Aristolochiales; Illiciales; Nymphaeales; Ranunculales; Papaverales; Hamamelidae: Trochodendrales; Hamamelidales; Daphniphyllales; Didymelales; Eucommiales; Urticales; Leitneriales; Juglandales; Myricales; Fagales; Casuarinales; Caryophyllidae: Caryophyllales; Polygonales; Plumbaginales; Dilleniidae: Dilleniales; Theales; Malvales; Lecythidales; Nepenthales; Violales; Salicales; Capparales; Batales; Ericales; Diapensiales; Ebenales; Primulales; Rosidae: Rosales; Fabales; Proteales; Podostemales; Haloragales; Myrtales; Rhizophorales; Cornales; Santalales; Rafflesiales; Celastrales; Euphorbiales; Rhamnales; Linales; Polygalales; Sapindales; Geraniales; Apiales; Asteridae: Gentianales; Solanales; Lamiales; Callitrichales; Plantaginales; Scrophulariales; Campanulales; Rubiales; Dipsacales; Calycerales; Asterales

=== Dahlgren and Thorne systems ===
Under the Dahlgren and Thorne systems, the subclass name Magnoliidae was used for the dicotyledons. This is also the case in some of the systems derived from the Cronquist system. These two systems are contrasted in the table below in terms of how each categorises by superorder; note that the sequence within each system has been altered in order to pair corresponding taxa.

The Thorne system (1992) as depicted by Reveal is:

Dahlgren system	Thorne system
Magnolianae Ranunculanae	Magnolianae Rafflesianae
Nymphaeanae	Nymphaeanae
Caryophyllanae	Caryophyllanae
Theanae Plumbaginanae; Polygonanae; Primulanae; Ericanae	Theanae
Malvanae	Malvanae
Violanae	Violanae
Rosanae	Rosanae
Proteanae	Proteanae
Myrtanae	Myrtanae
Rutanae	Rutanae Celastranae; Geranianae
Santalanae	Santalanae
Balanophoranae	Santalanae
Asteranae	Asteranae
Solananae	Solananae
Cornanae Vitanae	Cornanae Aralianae
Loasanae	Loasanae
Gentiananae Lamianae	Gentiananae

There exist variances between the superorders circumscribed from each system. Namely, although the systems share common names for many of the listed superorders, the specific list orders classified within each varies. For example, Thorne's Theanae corresponds to five distinct superorders under Dahlgren's system, only one of which is called Theanae.

== See also ==
- Calyciflorae
