= Goldberg system =

System of plant taxonomy

A system of plant taxonomy, the Goldberg system was published in:

- Goldberg (1986). "Classification, Evolution and Phylogeny of the Families of Dicotyledons". Smithsonian Contributions to Botany. 58: 1–314.
- Goldberg (1989). "Classification, Evolution and Phylogeny of the Families of Monocotyledons". Smithsonian Contributions to Botany. 71: 1–73.

Aaron Goldberg treats the Angiosperms, in which he recognizes 334 families and 59 orders of dicotyledons and accept 57 families and 18 orders of monocotyledons:

== Dicotyledoneae ==
- Classis Dicotyledoneae
  Ordo Trochodendrales
  Tetracentraceae
  Trochodendraceae
  Eupteleaceae
  Cercidiphyllaceae
  Ordo Hamamelidales
  Platanaceae
  Hamamelidaceae
  Buxaceae
  Myrothamnaceae
  Daphniphyllaceae
  Didymelaceae
  Ordo Magnoliales
  Magnoliaceae
  Degeneriaceae
  Himantandraceae
  Winteraceae
  Annonaceae
  Eupomatiaceae
  Myristicaceae
  Canellaceae
  Schisandraceae
  Illiciaceae
  Austrobaileyaceae
  Trimeniaceae
  Amborellaceae
  Monimiaceae
  Calycanthaceae
  Idiospermaceae (now part of Calycanthaceae)
  Ordo Laurales
  Gomortegaceae
  Lauraceae
  Hernandiaceae
  Ordo Aristolochiales
  Aristolochiaceae
  Ordo Ranunculales
  Ranunculaceae
  Berberidaceae
  Sargentodoxaceae
  Lardizabalaceae
  Menispermaceae
  Nandinaceae
  Podophyllaceae
  Paeoniaceae
  Circaeasteraceae
  Ordo Haloragales
  Haloragaceae
  Gunneraceae
  Hippuridaceae
  Callitrichaceae
  Ordo Sarraceniales
  Sarraceniaceae
  Ordo Nepenthales
  Nepenthaceae
  Ordo Piperales
  Saururaceae
  Piperaceae
  Chloranthaceae
  Lactoridaceae
  Ordo Nymphaeales
  Nymphaeaceae
  Ceratophyllaceae
  Cabombaceae
  Nelumbonaceae
  Ordo Proteales
  Proteaceae
  Ordo Balanopales
  Balanopaceae
  Ordo Fagales
  Betulaceae
  Fagaceae
  Simmondsiaceae
  Leitneriaceae
  Myricaceae
  Juglandaceae
  Rhoipteleaceae
  Ordo Salicales
  Salicaceae
  Ordo Casuarinales
  Casuarinaceae
  Ordo Urticales
  Ulmaceae
  Moraceae
  Urticaceae
  Eucommiaceae
  Barbeyaceae
  Cannabaceae
  Ordo Fabales
  Fabaceae
  Mimosaceae
  Caesalpiniaceae
  Ordo Papaverales
  Papaveraceae
  Fumariaceae
  Capparaceae
  Brassicaceae
  Tovariaceae
  Resedaceae
  Moringaceae
  Pentadiplandraceae
  Bretschneideraceae
  Ordo Batales
  Bataceae
  Ordo Dilleniales
  Dilleniaceae
  Actinidiaceae
  Saurauiaceae
  Ordo Theales
  Theaceae
  Pentaphylacaceae
  Bonnetiaceae
  Pellicieraceae
  Medusagynaceae
  Eucryphiaceae
  Paracryphiaceae
  Symplocaceae
  Clusiaceae
  Tetrameristaceae
  Quiinaceae
  Hypericaceae
  Elatinaceae
  Dipterocarpaceae
  Ancistrocladaceae
  Caryocaraceae
  Marcgraviaceae
  Ochnaceae
  Strasburgeriaceae
  Diegodendraceae
  Sphaerosepalaceae
  Scytopetalaceae
  Sarcolaenaceae
  Ordo Ebenales
  Sapotaceae
  Ebenaceae
  Ordo Styracales
  Styracaceae
  Lissocarpaceae
  Alangiaceae
  Ordo Violales
  Flacourtiaceae
  Lacistemataceae
  Malesherbiaceae
  Passifloraceae
  Turneraceae
  Achariaceae
  Caricaceae
  Violaceae
  Stachyuraceae
  Scyphostegiaceae
  Peridiscaceae
  Hoplestigmataceae
  Loasaceae
  Cucurbitaceae
  Ordo Cistales
  Cistaceae
  Bixaceae
  Cochlospermaceae
  Ordo Ericales
  Clethraceae
  Pyrolaceae
  Ericaceae
  Empetraceae
  Monotropaceae
  Epacridaceae
  Diapensiaceae
  Cyrillaceae
  Lennoaceae
  Ordo Rafflesiales
  Rafflesiaceae
  Hydnoraceae
  Ordo Balanophorales
  Balanophoraceae
  Ordo Celastrales
  Ctenolophonaceae
  Ixonanthaceae
  Irvingiaceae
  Dichapetalaceae
  Celastraceae
  Goupiaceae
  Siphonodontaceae
  Ordo Rhamnales
  Rhamnaceae
  Vitaceae
  Leeaceae
  Erythropalaceae
  Aquifoliaceae
  Icacinaceae
  Ordo Caryophyllales
  Cactaceae
  Aizoaceae
  Portulacaceae
  Theligonaceae
  Didiereaceae
  Gyrostemonaceae
  Phytolaccaceae
  Barbeuiaceae
  Achatocarpaceae
  Petiveriaceae
  Agdestidaceae
  Nyctaginaceae
  Stegnospermaceae
  Caryophyllaceae
  Molluginaceae
  Illecebraceae
  Basellaceae
  Chenopodiaceae
  Amaranthaceae
  Ordo Primulales
  Theophrastaceae
  Myrsinaceae
  Primulaceae
  Plumbaginaceae
  Tamaricaceae
  Frankeniaceae
  Ordo Polygonales
  Polygonaceae
  Ordo Plantaginales
  Plantaginaceae
  Ordo Euphorbiales
  Euphorbiaceae
  Aextoxicaceae
  Pandaceae
  Ordo Malvales
  Elaeocarpaceae
  Tiliaceae
  Malvaceae
  Bombacaceae
  Sterculiaceae
  Ordo Rosales
  Rosaceae
  Corynocarpaceae
  Crossosomataceae
  Neuradaceae
  Coriariaceae
  Ordo Myrtales
  Myrtaceae
  Lecythidaceae
  Barringtoniaceae
  Asteranthaceae
  Dialypetalanthaceae
  Sonneratiaceae
  Punicaceae
  Rhizophoraceae
  Lythraceae
  Crypteroniaceae
  Oliniaceae
  Melastomataceae
  Trapaceae
  Combretaceae
  Onagraceae
  Penaeaceae
  Ordo Saxifragales
  Saxifragaceae
  Crassulaceae
  Parnassiaceae
  Eremosynaceae
  Francoaceae
  Davidsoniaceae
  Hydrangeaceae
  Philadelphaceae
  Pterostemonaceae
  Iteaceae
  Baueraceae
  Bruniaceae
  Vahliaceae
  Donatiaceae
  Tetracarpaeaceae
  Escalloniaceae
  Grossulariaceae
  Brunelliaceae
  Cunoniaceae
  Greyiaceae
  Cephalotaceae
  Ordo Droserales
  Dioncophyllaceae
  Droseraceae
  Byblidaceae
  Podostemaceae
  Hydrostachyaceae
  Ordo Begoniales
  Datiscaceae
  Begoniaceae
  Ordo Apiales
  Araliaceae
  Apiaceae
  Ordo Cornales
  Nyssaceae
  Davidiaceae
  Cornaceae
  Garryaceae
  Ordo Dipsacales
  Caprifoliaceae
  Adoxaceae
  Valerianaceae
  Dipsacaceae
  Ordo Rutales
  Rutaceae
  Cneoraceae
  Simaroubaceae
  Burseraceae
  Meliaceae
  Anacardiaceae
  Ordo Sapindales
  Akaniaceae
  Aceraceae
  Sapindaceae
  Hippocastanaceae
  Staphyleaceae
  Sabiaceae
  Melianthaceae
  Ordo Geraniales
  Geraniaceae
  Vivianiaceae
  Limnanthaceae
  Oxalidaceae
  Tropaeolaceae
  Connaraceae
  Balsaminaceae
  Stackhousiaceae
  Zygophyllaceae
  Linaceae
  Erythroxylaceae
  Balanitaceae
  Malpighiaceae
  Ordo Polygalales
  Polygalaceae
  Krameriaceae
  Trigoniaceae
  Vochysiaceae
  Ordo Oleales
  Oleaceae
  Salvadoraceae
  Ordo Gentianales
  Loganiaceae
  Plocospermataceae
  Apocynaceae
  Asclepiadaceae
  Convolvulaceae
  Cuscutaceae
  Rubiaceae
  Columelliaceae
  Gentianaceae
  Menyanthaceae
  Ordo Santalales
  Olacaceae
  Aptandraceae
  Octoknemaceae
  Opiliaceae
  Medusandraceae
  Cardiopteridaceae
  Santalaceae
  Misodendraceae
  Loranthaceae
  Grubbiaceae
  Ordo Thymelaeales
  Geissolomataceae
  Gonystylaceae
  Thymelaeaceae
  Ordo Polemoniales
  Polemoniaceae
  Fouquieriaceae
  Hydrophyllaceae
  Boraginaceae
  Ordo Scrophulariales
  Nolanaceae
  Solanaceae
  Scrophulariaceae
  Buddlejaceae
  Globulariaceae
  Lentibulariaceae
  Orobanchaceae
  Acanthaceae
  Bignoniaceae
  Gesneriaceae
  Pedaliaceae
  Ordo Lamiales
  Myoporaceae
  Verbenaceae
  Phrymaceae
  Lamiaceae
  Ordo Campanulales
  Campanulaceae
  Goodeniaceae
  Brunoniaceae
  Calyceraceae
  Stylidiaceae
  Ordo Asterales
  Asteraceae
  Incertae sedis
  Tremandraceae
  Elaeagnaceae
  Pittosporaceae

== Monocotyledoneae ==
- Classis Monocotyledoneae
  Ordo Pandanales
  Pandanaceae
  Ordo Alismatales
  Alismataceae
  Butomaceae
  Hydrocharitaceae
  Ordo Triuridales
  Triuridaceae
  Ordo Juncaginales
  Scheuchzeriaceae
  Juncaginaceae
  Lilaeaceae (syn. of Juncaginaceae)
  Ordo Najadales
  Aponogetonaceae
  Zosteraceae
  Potamogetonaceae
  Zannichelliaceae
  Najadaceae
  Posidoniaceae
  Ordo Typhales
  Sparganiaceae
  Typhaceae
  Ordo Juncales
  Juncaceae
  Thurniaceae
  Centrolepidaceae
  Restionaceae
  Flagellariaceae
  Ordo Cyperales
  Cyperaceae
  Ordo Poales
  Poaceae
  Ordo Arecales
  Arecaceae
  Ordo Cyclanthales
  Cyclanthaceae
  Ordo Arales
  Araceae
  Lemnaceae
  Ordo Liliales
  Trilliaceae
  Liliaceae
  Smilacaceae
  Agavaceae
  Xanthorrhoeaceae
  Philesiaceae
  Dioscoreaceae
  Taccaceae
  Pontederiaceae
  Amaryllidaceae
  Velloziaceae
  Ordo Bromeliales
  Bromeliaceae
  Ordo Commelinales
  Commelinaceae
  Mayacaceae
  Xyridaceae
  Rapateaceae
  Eriocaulaceae
  Ordo Zingiberales
  Musaceae
  Strelitziaceae
  Lowiaceae
  Zingiberaceae
  Cannaceae
  Marantaceae
  Ordo Iridales
  Haemodoraceae
  Philydraceae
  Iridaceae
  Burmanniaceae
  Ordo Orchidales
  Corsiaceae
  Orchidaceae
