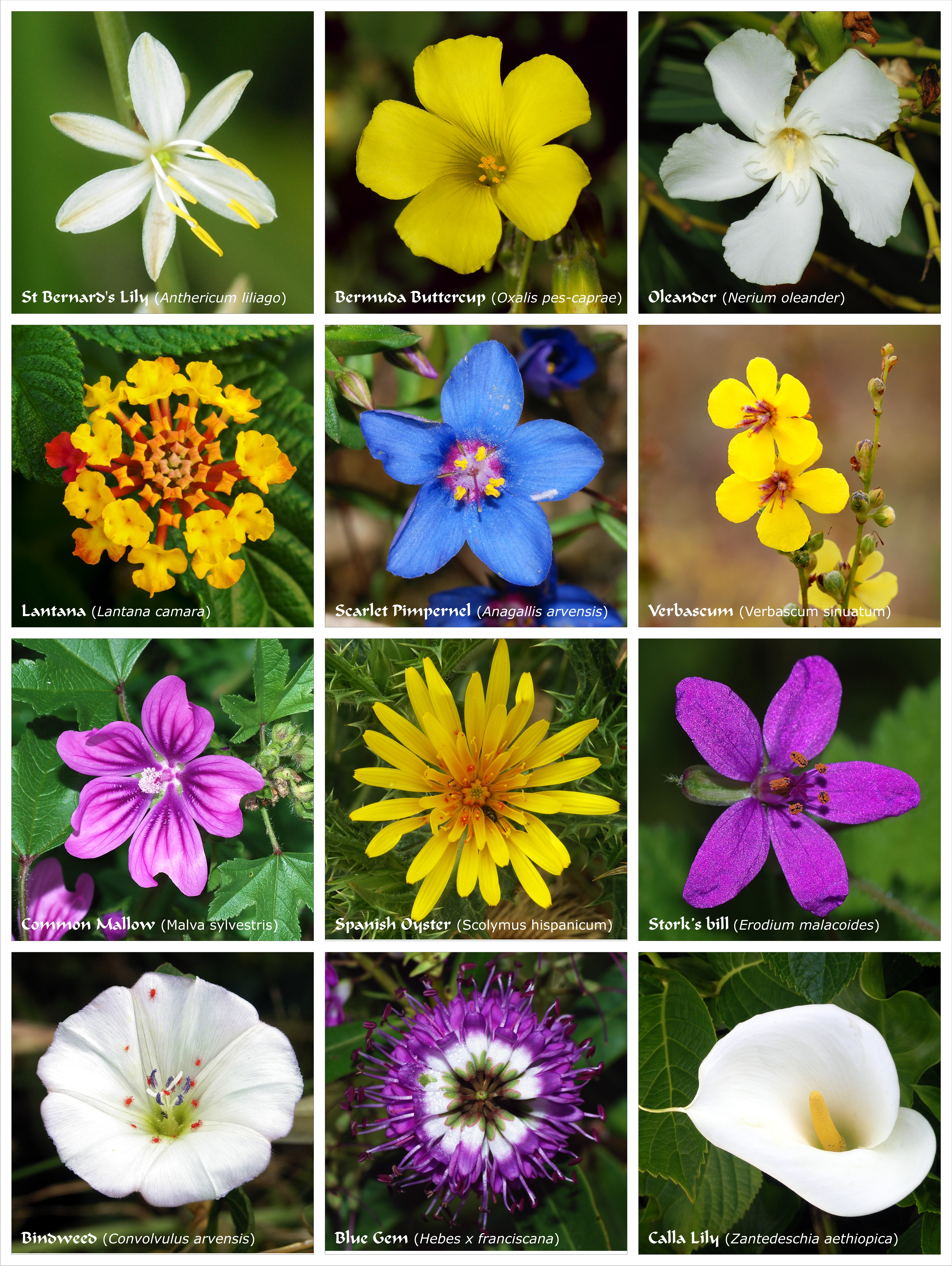
- Diversity of Mesangiosperms

Scientific classification
- Kingdom: Plantae
- Clade: Embryophytes
- Clade: Tracheophytes
- Clade: Angiosperms
- Clade: Mesangiosperms

Groups
- Magnoliids; Chloranthales; Monocots; Ceratophyllales; Eudicots

Synonyms
- Core angiosperms

= Mesangiospermae =

One of two clades of flowering plants

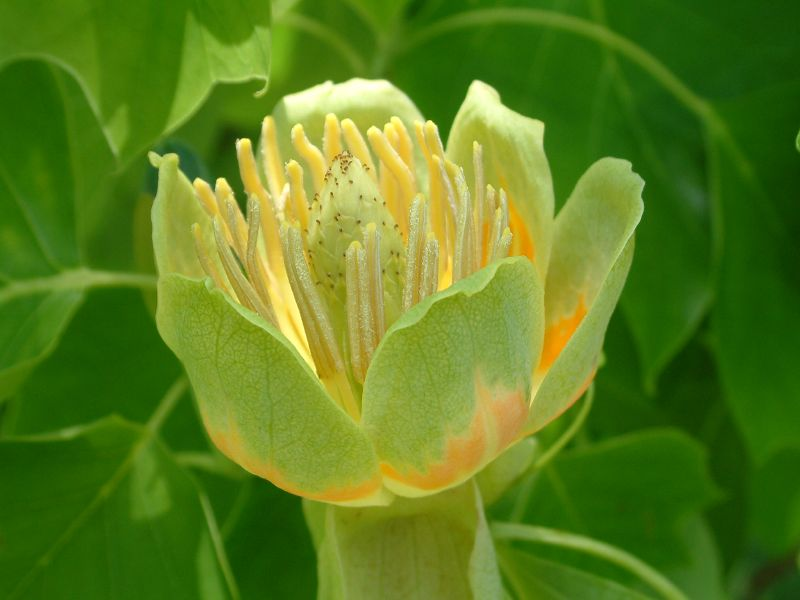
Flower of Liriodendron tulipifera, a Mesangiosperm

Mesangiospermae is a clade that contains the majority of flowering plants (angiosperms). Mesangiosperms are therefore known as the core angiosperms, in contrast to the three orders of earlier-diverging species known as the basal angiosperms: Nymphaeales (including water lilies), Austrobaileyales (including star anise), and Amborellales. Mesangiospermae includes about 350,000 species, while there are about 175 extant species of basal angiosperms.

It is a name created under the rules of the PhyloCode system of phylogenetic nomenclature. While such a clade with a similar circumscription exists in the APG III system, it was not given a name.

== Phylogeny ==
Besides the mesangiosperms, the other groups of flowering plants are Amborellales, Nymphaeales, and Austrobaileyales. These constitute a paraphyletic grade called basal angiosperms. The order names, ending in -ales are used here without reference to taxonomic rank because these groups contain only one order.

Mesangiospermae includes the following clades:

- Ceratophyllales
- Chloranthales
- eudicots
- magnoliidae
- monocots

Cladogram: The phylogenetic position of the Mesangiospermae within the angiosperms, as of APG IV (2016)

- angiosperms
  - Amborellales
  - - Nymphaeales
    - - Austrobaileyales
      - - Mesangiospermae
          - magnoliids
          - Chloranthales
          - - monocots
            - - Ceratophyllales
              - eudicots

== Name ==
The mesangiosperms are usually recognized in classification systems that do not assign groups to taxonomic rank. The name Mesangiospermae is a branch-modified node-based name in phylogenetic nomenclature. It is defined as the most inclusive crown clade containing Platanus occidentalis, but not Amborella trichopoda, Nymphaea odorata, or Austrobaileya scandens. It is sometimes written as /Mesangiospermae even though this is not required by the PhyloCode. The "clademark" slash indicates that the term is intended as phylogenetically defined.

== Description ==
In molecular phylogenetic studies, the mesangiosperms are always strongly supported as a monophyletic group. There is no distinguishing characteristic which is found in all mature mesangiosperms but which is not found in any of the basal angiosperms. Nevertheless, the mesangiosperms are recognizable in the earliest stage of embryonic development. The ovule contains a megagametophyte, also known as an embryo sac, that is bipolar in structure and contains 8 cell nuclei. The antipodal cells are persistent, and the endosperm is triploid.

== History ==
The oldest known fossils of flowering plants are fossil mesangiosperms from the Hauterivian stage of the Cretaceous period.

Molecular clock comparisons of DNA sequences indicate that the mesangiosperms originated between 140 and 150 Mya (million years ago) near the beginning of the Cretaceous period. This was about 25 Ma (million years) after the origin of the angiosperms in the mid-Jurassic.

By 135Mya, the mesangiosperms had radiated into 5 groups: Chloranthales, Magnoliids, Monocots, Ceratophyllales, and Eudicots. The radiation into 5 groups probably occurred in about 4 million years.

Because the interval of this radiation (about 4 million years) is short in proportion to its age (about 145 million years), it had long appeared that the 5 groups of mesangiosperms had arisen simultaneously. The mesangiosperms were shown as an unresolved pentatomy in phylogenetic trees. In 2007, two studies attempted to resolve the phylogenetic relationships among these 5 groups by comparing large portions of their chloroplast genomes. These studies agreed on the most likely phylogeny for the mesangiosperms. In this phylogeny, the monocots are sister to the clade [Ceratophyllales + eudicots]. However, this result is not strongly supported. The approximately unbiased topology test showed that some of the other possible positions of the monocots had more than 5% probability of being correct. The major weakness of these 2 studies was the small number of species whose DNA was being used in the phylogenetic analysis, 45 in one study and 64 in the other. This was unavoidable, because complete chloroplast genome sequences are known for only a few plants.

== Bibliography ==
- APG IV (2016). "An update of the Angiosperm Phylogeny Group classification for the orders and families of flowering plants: APG IV". Botanical Journal of the Linnean Society. 181 (1): 1–20. doi:10.1111/boj.12385.
- Soltis, Pamela S; Soltis, Douglas E (April 2016). "Ancient WGD events as drivers of key innovations in angiosperms". Current Opinion in Plant Biology. 30: 159–165. doi:10.1016/j.pbi.2016.03.015. PMID 27064530.
- Zeng, Liping; Zhang, Qiang; Sun, Renran; Kong, Hongzhi; Zhang, Ning; Ma, Hong (24 September 2014). "Resolution of deep angiosperm phylogeny using conserved nuclear genes and estimates of early divergence times". Nature Communications. 5 (4956): 4956. Bibcode:2014NatCo...5.4956Z. doi:10.1038/ncomms5956. PMC 4200517. PMID 25249442.
