= Acacia argyrotricha =

Conservation status
- Vulnerable (NCA)

Scientific classification
- Kingdom: Plantae
- Clade: Tracheophytes
- Clade: Angiosperms
- Clade: Eudicots
- Clade: Rosids
- Order: Fabales
- Family: Fabaceae
- Subfamily: Caesalpinioideae
- Clade: Mimosoid clade
- Genus: Acacia
- Species: A. argyrotricha

Binomial name
- Acacia argyrotricha Leslie Pedley

Synonyms
- Acacia sp. (Inglewood A.R.Bean 1115); Racosperma argyrotrichum (Pedley) Pedley

Species of legume

Acacia argyrotricha, commonly known as Bracker wattle, is a species of flowering plant in the family Fabaceae and is endemic to Queensland. It is a shrub with hairy branchlets, linear, flattened phyllodes, deep yellow flowers arranged in head of 30 to 40, and linear pods up to 750 mm (30 in) long.

== Description ==
Acacia argyrotricha is a shrub that typically grows to a height of 1–2 m (3 ft 3 in – 6 ft 7 in) and has branchlets covered with long, white hairs, pressed against the surface. Its phyllodes are linear, flattened and thick, 100–150 mm (3.9–5.9 in) long and 1.0–1.8 mm (0.039–0.071 in) wide with a dark brown point on the tip. The flowers are borne in pairs of heads on a peduncle 1.0–2.5 mm (0.039–0.098 in) long with 30 to 40 deep yellow flowers in each head. Flowering occurs in September and October and the pods are leathery, linear and raised over the seeds, up to 75 mm (3.0 in) long and about 2.5 mm (0.098 in) wide containing broadly oblong seeds 3–4 mm (0.12–0.16 in) long and 1.7–2.0 mm (0.067–0.079 in) wide.

== Taxonomy ==
Acacia argyrotricha was first formally described in 1999 by the botanist Leslie Pedley in the journal Austrobaileya from specimens collected in the Bracker State Forest, south of Inglewood in 1989. The specific epithet (argyrotricha) means 'having silvery hairs', especially on the pods.

== Distribution ==
This species of wattle is only known from the type location where it grows in sandy soil in eucalypt woodland.

== Conservation status ==
Acacia argyrotricha is listed as "vulnerable", under the Queensland Government Nature Conservation Act 1992.

== See also ==
- List of Acacia species
