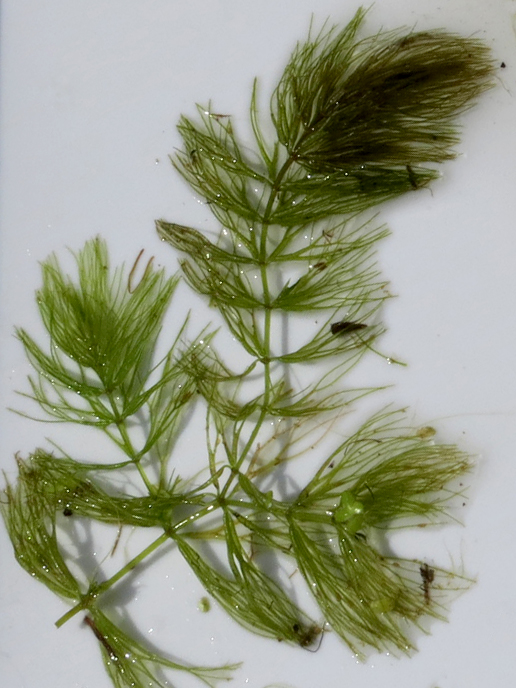

Scientific classification
- Kingdom: Plantae
- Clade: Embryophytes
- Clade: Tracheophytes
- Clade: Spermatophytes
- Clade: Angiosperms
- Order: Ceratophyllales
- Family: Ceratophyllaceae
- Genus: Ceratophyllum
- Species: C. echinatum

Binomial name
- Ceratophyllum echinatum A.Gray

= Ceratophyllum echinatum =

Species of aquatic flowering plant

Ceratophyllum echinatum, known as prickly coontail or spiny coontail, is an aquatic, perennial plant found in North America. Its name comes from fruits, which have a warty surface and long spines. Spiny coontail can be found in ponds and lakes, principally in eastern North America. It is the only species of its genus endemic to North America.

Ceratophyllum comes from the Greek keras, "a horn" and phyllon, "leaf", which is alluding to the stiff and narrow leaf divisions. The specific epithet echinatum comes from echinus which means sea urchin or hedgehog.

== Description ==
Ceratophyllum echinatum is an aquatic herb. It does not typically have any roots with stems that are freely branching and up to 4 m (13 ft) in length. The leaves are submerged and they are usually in whorls of 5 to 12. Its flowers do not have any petals but have sepals (3 to 15) that are sometimes mistaken for petals. The flower is tiny, may be male or female, and contains about 12 to 16 stamens. It blooms from February to July. The fruits have dry seeds with spines and a rough surface.

== Threatened and endangered status ==
Several states list this species as special concern (Maine, Tennessee), threatened (New York), or endangered (Maryland, New Jersey).
