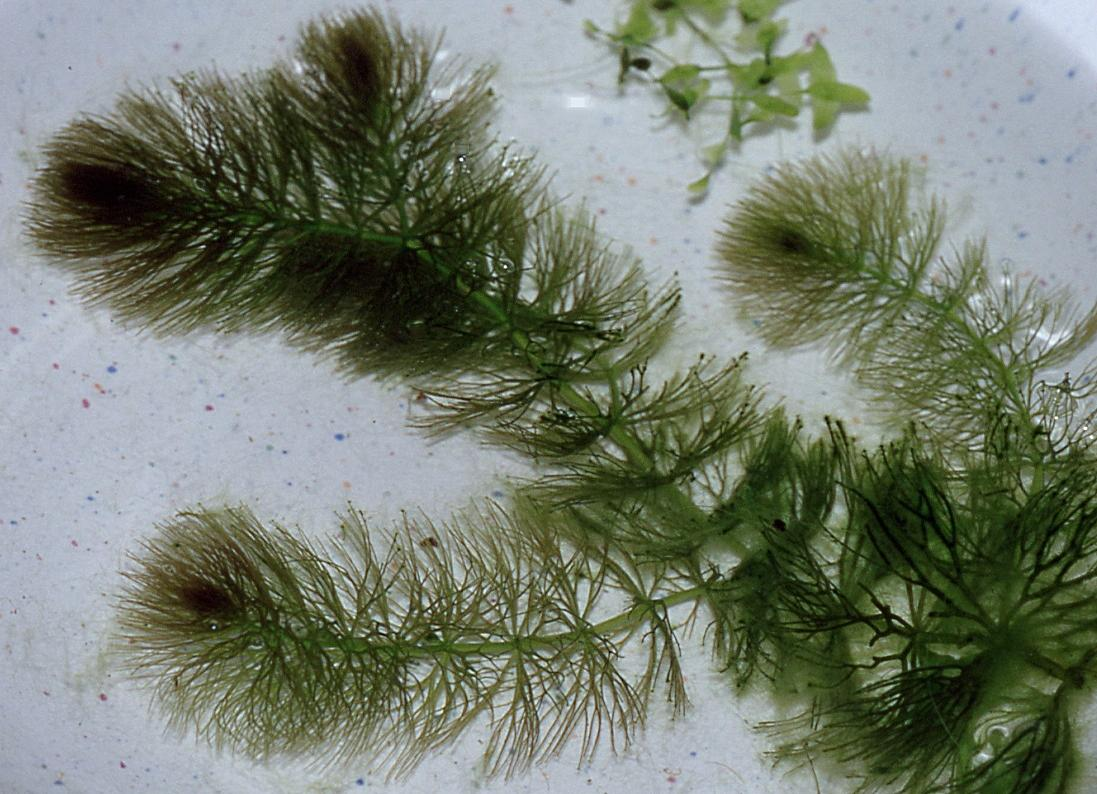

Conservation status
- Least Concern (IUCN 3.1)

Scientific classification
- Kingdom: Plantae
- Clade: Embryophytes
- Clade: Tracheophytes
- Clade: Angiosperms
- Order: Ceratophyllales
- Family: Ceratophyllaceae
- Genus: Ceratophyllum
- Species: C. submersum

Binomial name
- Ceratophyllum submersum L.

= Ceratophyllum submersum =

Aquatic species of flowering plant

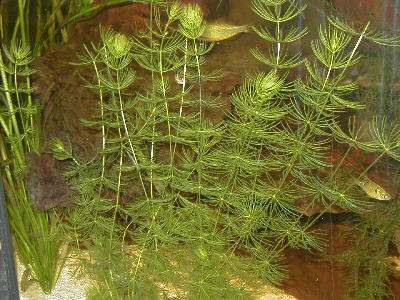
Ceratophyllum submersum

Ceratophyllum submersum, commonly known as the soft hornwort or tropical hornwort, is a species of Ceratophyllum. It is a submerged, free-floating aquatic plant. It has been reported from Europe, Central Asia, northern Africa, scattered places in tropical Africa, Turkey, Oman, Florida, and the Dominican Republic. It is similar to the submerged macrophyte Ceratophyllum demersum, a congeneric plant that is found in most regions of the world.

== Description ==
The C. submersum, is a free floating aquatic plant which forks from stem three to four times and ends have 6 to 8 threadlike tips. The temperature tolerance is suggested to be between 4 to 30 °C (39 to 86 °F), the optimal temperature is noted to be 15 to 30 °C (59 to 86 °F). The height of the plant is often 6–12 in. (15–30 cm) or 12–18 in. (30–45 cm).

== Identification ==
Soft hornwort and rigid hornwort (Ceratophyllum demersum) can look very similar, despite the difference in texture that is apparent in mature plants. To confirm which species is present, one should check the number of times the leaves divide: just one or two times in rigid hornwort, versus three or four times in soft hornwort.

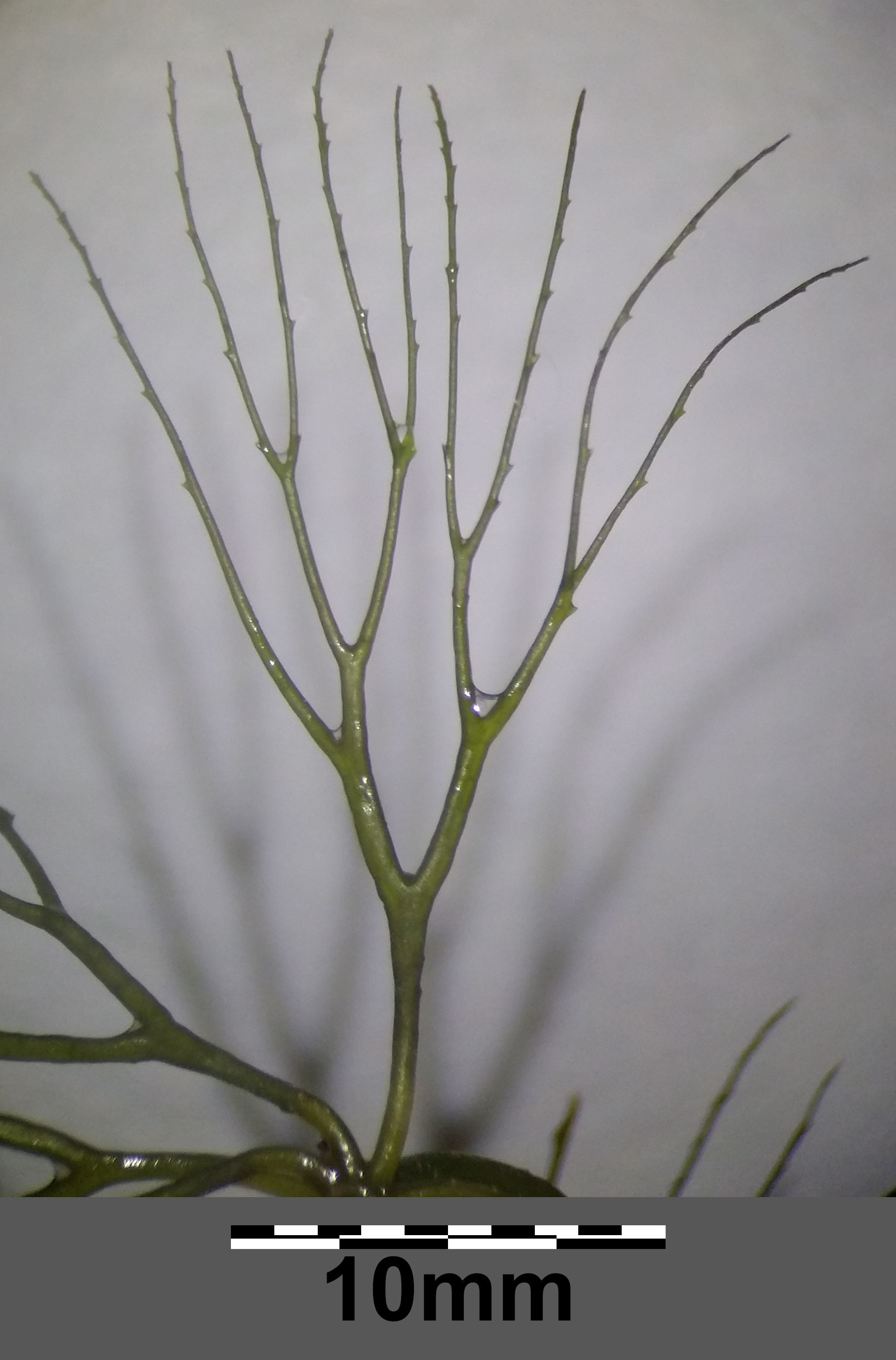
The leaves of soft hornwort are usually branched three or four times, resulting in 8–16 terminal segments.

== Habitat ==
C. submersum prefers to colonize eutrophic waters around agricultural systems. C. submersum is a self-regulating rapid grower like Ceratophyllum demersum. It strives in a moderately lit environment. In a strong lighted environment C. submersum attains an auburn color tint. Since this aquatic plant has a fast growth it has to be trimmed often, or at least be provided a larger tank or environment to accommodate it for proper function. It is found submerged in freshwater in tropical regions of the world, with the species being introduced in newer areas around the world, such as Ireland. It has been found in the Rosetta branch of the Nile River of Egypt, where it thrives in either various locations at different times of the year.

=== Ecology ===
Its presence in waters have been associated with a decrease in nitrogen forms such NH_{4} and NO_{3} in water, but an increase in pH, conductivity and dissolved oxygen. While C. demersum has been negatively associated with all phytoplankton classes, C. submersum was positively associated with them, chlorophyll a and Cyanophyceae. C. submersum and C. demersum do not share the same habitat, with the cosmopolitan C. demersum being more distributed, indicating a similar niches. In some cases, C. submersum can overtake C. demersum in one vegetative season in a body of water.

== Human uses ==
C. submersum is often used in aquariums as a way to decrease nitrogen in artificial aquatic systems. However, it is not as common in usage as the C. demersum. It is propagated by cutting the stem of the plant and placing it in the aquatic system. After the organic matter is converted to soluble inorganic matter the C. submersum helps to oxygenates waste water.
