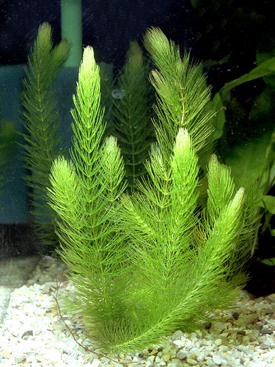

Conservation status
- Secure (NatureServe)

Scientific classification
- Kingdom: Plantae
- Clade: Embryophytes
- Clade: Tracheophytes
- Clade: Spermatophytes
- Clade: Angiosperms
- Order: Ceratophyllales
- Family: Ceratophyllaceae
- Genus: Ceratophyllum
- Species: C. demersum

Binomial name
- Ceratophyllum demersum L.

= Ceratophyllum demersum =

Species of aquatic flowering plant

Ceratophyllum demersum, commonly called hornwort or coontail, is a species of flowering plant in the genus Ceratophyllum. Ceratophyllum demersum is a submerged, free-floating aquatic plant, with a cosmopolitan distribution, native to all continents except Antarctica. It is a harmful weed introduced in New Zealand. It is also a popular aquarium plant. Its genome has been sequenced to study angiosperm evolution.

== Name ==
The genus name Ceratophyllum is latinized from Greek κέρας kéras (combining κέρατ- kerat-), "horn, antler", and φύλλον phúllon, "leaf", in allusion to the resemblance of the leaves to antlers. This name is directly mirrored in the German and Dutch common names, Hornblatt and hoornblad respectively.

In English the plant is most commonly called hornwort, a name shared with the unrelated Anthocerotophytes (which has a distinctive horn-like sporophyte); for this reason, the name coontail (or coon's tail) is sometimes preferred. Other common names include hornweed, morassweed, cornifle, and hornleaf.

== Description ==
An aquatic plant, Ceratophyllum demersum has stems that reach lengths of 1–3 m (3–10 ft), with numerous side shoots making a single specimen appear as a large, bushy mass. The leaves are produced in whorls of six to twelve, each leaf 8–40 mm long, simple, or forked into two to eight thread-like segments edged with spiny teeth; they are stiff and brittle. It is monoecious, with separate male and female flowers produced on the same plant. The flowers are small, 2 mm long, with eight or more greenish-brown petals; they are produced in the leaf axils. The fruit is a small nut 4–5 mm long, usually with three spines, two basal and one apical, 1–12 mm long. Plants with the two basal nut spines very short are sometimes distinguished as Ceratophyllum demersum var. apiculatum (Cham.) Asch., and those with no basal spines sometimes distinguished as Ceratophyllum demersum var. inerme Gay ex Radcl.-Sm. It can form turions: buds that sink to the bottom of the water and stay there during the winter before forming new plants in spring.

== Identification ==
Rigid coontails can be easily confused with soft coontails (Ceratophyllum submersum), especially when there is young growth with less stiff leaves. A key feature to look out for is the number of times a leaf is branched: the leaves are only forked once or twice, rather than three to four times in soft coontails. They are also rather more roughly toothed.

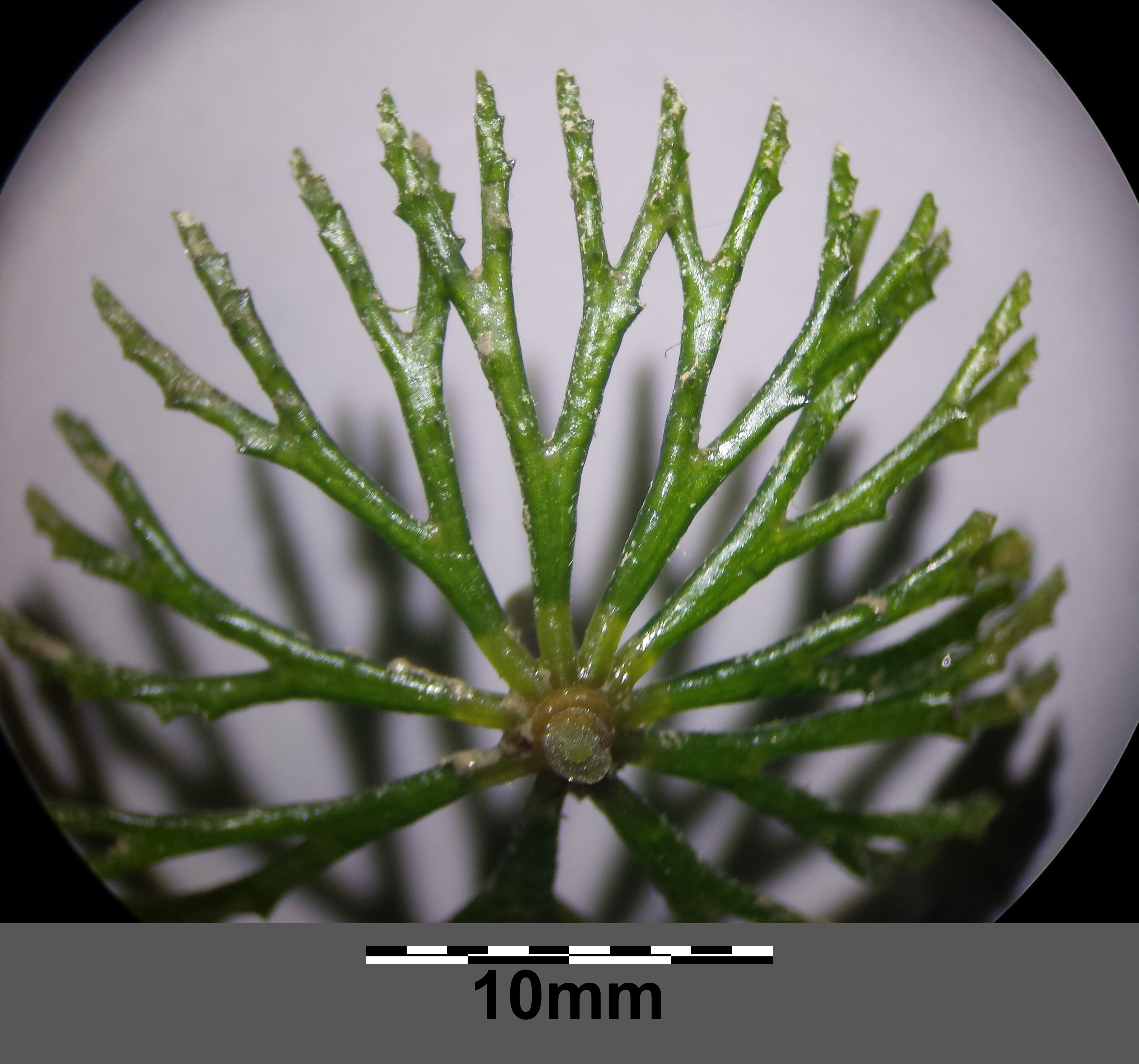
The leaves are forked only twice in rigid coontails.

== Distribution and habitat ==
Ceratophyllum demersum grows in lakes, ponds, and quiet streams with summer water temperatures of 15–30 °C and a rich nutrient status. In North America, it occurs in the entire US and Canada, except Newfoundland. In Europe, it has been reported as far north as at a latitude of 66 degrees in Norway. Other reported occurrences include China, Siberia (at 66 degrees North), Burkina Faso and in the Volta River in Ghana (Africa), Vietnam, and New Zealand (introduced). Ceratophyllum demersum grows in still or very slow-moving water.

=== Invasive status ===
Coontails are a declared weed under the Tasmanian Weed Management Act 1999 in Tasmania, Australia, and is classed as an unwanted organism in New Zealand.

== Ecology ==
C. demersum has allelopathic qualities as it excretes substances that inhibit the growth of phytoplankton and cyanobacteria (blue-green algae). Its dense growth can outcompete other underwater vegetation, leading to loss of biodiversity. In New Zealand, it has caused problems with hydroelectric power plants.

== Cultivation and uses ==
This species is often used as a floating freshwater plant in both coldwater and tropical aquaria. Though without roots, it may attach itself to the substrate or objects in the aquarium. Its fluffy, filamentous, bright-green leaves provide excellent cover for newly hatched fish. It is propagated by cuttings. This plant appears to drop all its leaves when exposed to products designed to kill snails. The stems can recover relatively quickly, growing new leaves within a few weeks.

It is frequently used as a model organism for studies of plant physiology. One of the reasons for this is that it allows studies on shoot effects without influence of a root, which often makes interpretation of nutrition and toxicity experiments difficult in terrestrial plants. As it is free floating and therefore does not require a solid substrate, it has been used successfully in the biological life support systems "Aquarack/CEBAS" and "Omegahab" on space flights.

Coontail plants or the epiphytes they support have been shown to degrade the herbicide atrazine.
