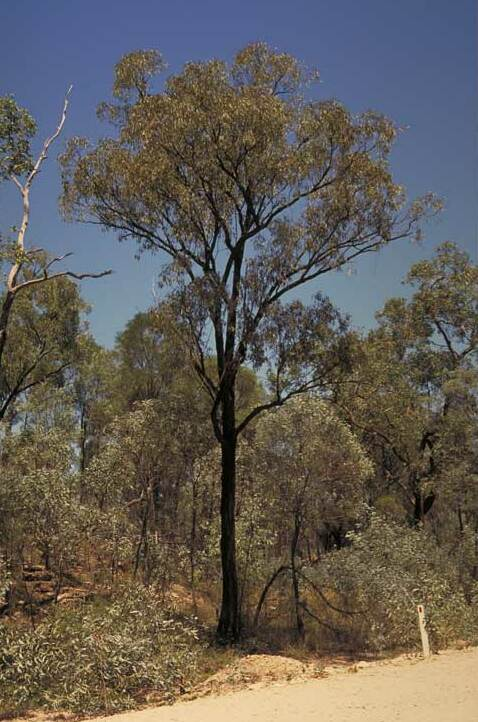

Scientific classification
- Kingdom: Plantae
- Clade: Tracheophytes
- Clade: Angiosperms
- Clade: Eudicots
- Clade: Rosids
- Order: Myrtales
- Family: Myrtaceae
- Genus: Eucalyptus
- Species: E. tholiformis

Binomial name
- Eucalyptus tholiformis A.R.Bean & Brooker

= Eucalyptus tholiformis =

Species of eucalyptus

Eucalyptus tholiformis is a species of tree that is endemic to a small area in Queensland. It has rough, deeply furrowed iron bark on the trunk and larger branches, lance-shaped adult leaves, flower buds in groups of seven, white flowers and cup-shaped to funnel-shaped fruit.

== Description ==
Eucalyptus tholiformis is a tree that typically grows to a height of 15 m (49 ft) and forms a lignotuber. It has thick, furrowed dark grey to black bark on the trunk and larger branches, sometimes smooth white bark on the thinner branches. Young plants and coppice regrowth have dull bluish grey leaves that are 40–70 mm (1.6–2.8 in) long and 22–40 mm (0.87–1.57 in) wide. Adult leaves are the same shade of dull bluish green on both sides, lance-shaped, 75–140 mm (3.0–5.5 in) long and 12–30 mm (0.47–1.18 in) wide, tapering to a petiole 12–20 mm (0.47–0.79 in) long. The flower buds are mostly arranged on the ends of branchlets in groups of seven on a branching peduncle 5–15 mm (0.20–0.59 in) long, the individual buds sessile or on pedicels up to 5 mm (0.20 in) long. Mature buds are oval to cylindrical, 5–8 mm (0.20–0.31 in) long and 2–5 mm (0.079–0.197 in) wide with a rounded operculum. Flowering occurs between May and October and the flowers are white. The fruit is a sessile, woody, cup-shaped to funnel-shaped capsule 5–7 mm (0.20–0.28 in) long and 4–7 mm (0.16–0.28 in) wide with the valves protruding above the rim.

== Taxonomy and naming ==
Eucalyptus tholiformis was first formally described in 1994 by Anthony Bean and Ian Brooker in the journal Austrobaileya from specimens collected by Bean in the Salvator Rosa section of Carnarvon National Park in 1986. The specific epithet (tholiformis) is a Latin word meaning "dome-shaped", referring to the shape of the disc around the fruit.

== Distribution and habitat ==
This tree grows on shallow soil on sandstone hills in Carnarvon National Park from west of Alpha to east of Tambo in Queensland.

== Conservation status ==
This eucalypt is classified as "least concern" under the Queensland Government Nature Conservation Act 1992.

== See also ==
- List of Eucalyptus species
