= Coon tail =

Coon tail, coontail, or coon's tail may refer to:

- Ceratophyllum, aquatic plant
- Crotalus atrox, Western diamondback rattlesnake
