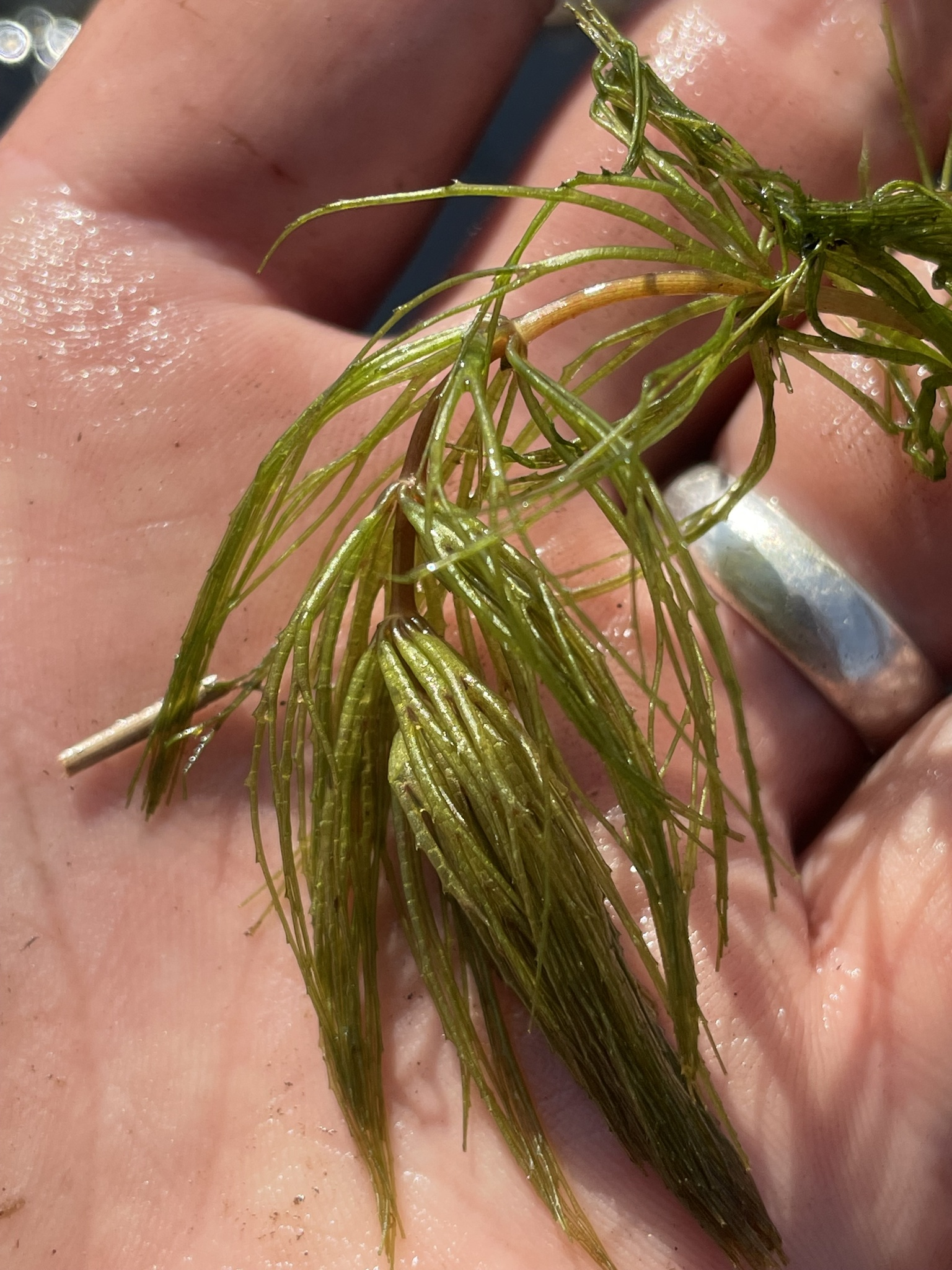

Conservation status
- Least Concern (IUCN 3.1)

Scientific classification
- Kingdom: Plantae
- Clade: Embryophytes
- Clade: Tracheophytes
- Clade: Spermatophytes
- Clade: Angiosperms
- Order: Ceratophyllales
- Family: Ceratophyllaceae
- Genus: Ceratophyllum
- Species: C. muricatum

Binomial name
- Ceratophyllum muricatum Cham.

Subspecies
- †C. muricatum incertum; C. muricatum muricatum

Synonyms
- C. demersum muricatum (Cham.) K.Schum. C. submersum muricatum (Cham.)

= Ceratophyllum muricatum =

Species of aquatic flowering plant

Ceratophyllum muricatum, commonly known as the prickly coontail, is a species of Ceratophyllum native to much of Europe, Asia, Africa, and the Americas.

In the US it has been observed specifically in the states of Florida, Georgia and North Carolina. It has also been observed in Cuba and Jamaica. This species is only able to thrive in inland areas, however, due to being a low-salinity tolerant species. It is rarely observed in coastal tropical areas for these reasons.

One fossil subspecies, Ceratophyllum muricatum incertum has been named from Early Eocene fossils found in the Green River Formation and the Wilcox Group.
