= Aristolochiales =

Order of flowering plants

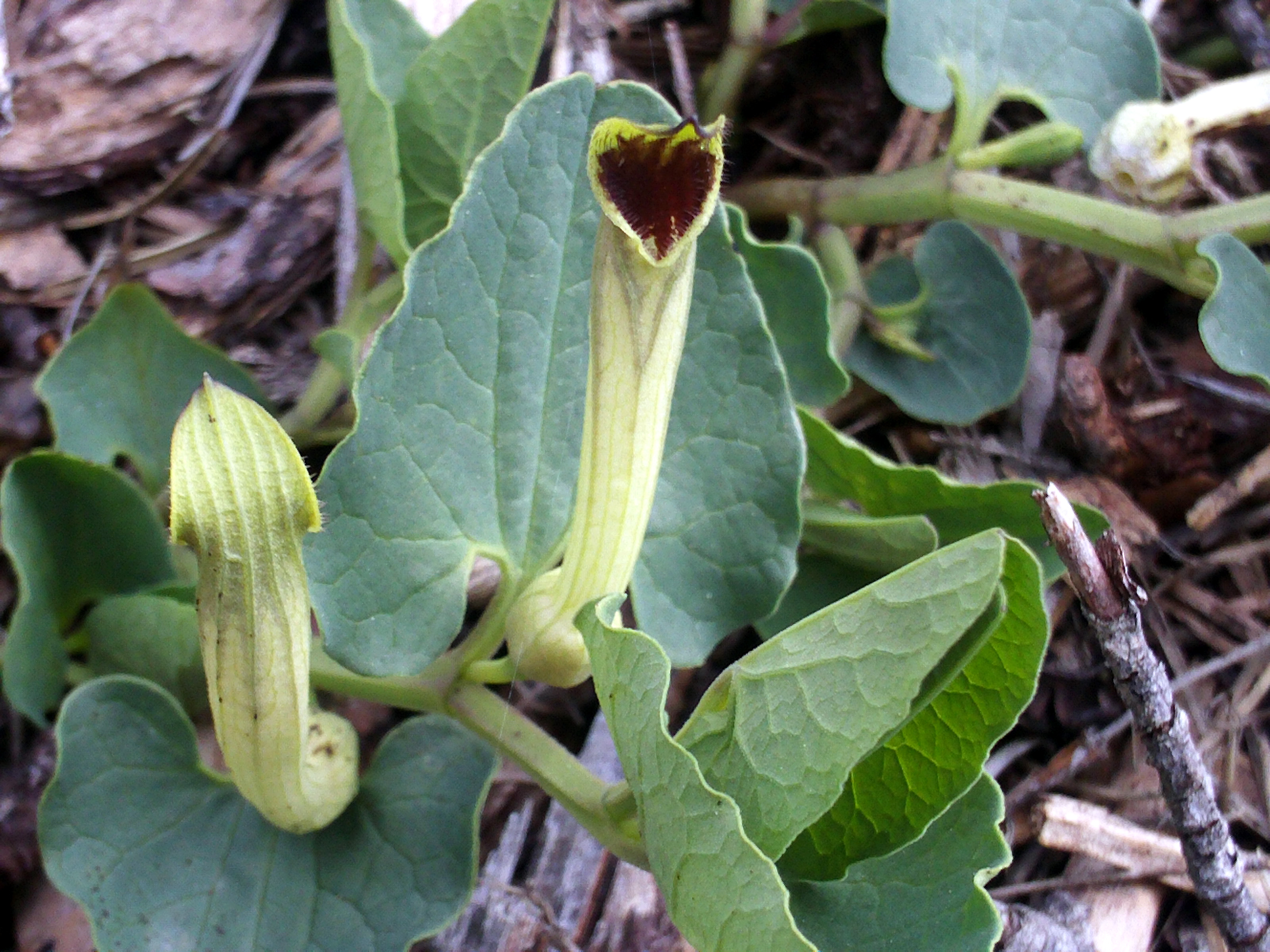
Aristolochia paucinervis

Aristolochiales is an order of flowering plants. It is not recognised in the APG or APG II systems, in which it is considered a synonym of Piperales. It also is not recognized in the Thorne system.

In the Cronquist, Dahlgren, Goldberg and Reveal systems it is composed of a single family, the Aristolochiaceae. In the Hutchinson system the carnivorous Nepenthaceae (now placed in Caryophyllales) and the parasitic Cytinaceae (now placed in Malvales) and Hydnoraceae (now placed in Piperales) are also included. In the Melchior (a.k.a. Engler) system Hydnoraceae and Rafflesiaceae (including Cytinaceae) are included in addition to Aristolochiaceae.
