= Basal angiosperms =

Descendants of most extant flowering plants

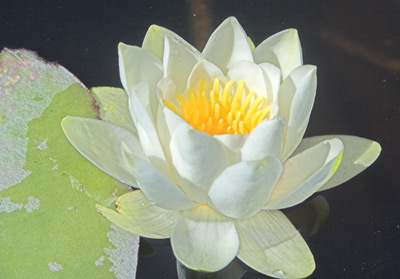
Nymphaea alba, from the Nymphaeales

The basal angiosperms are the flowering plants which diverged from the lineage leading to most flowering plants. In particular, the most basal angiosperms were called the ANITA grade, which is made up of Amborella (a single species of shrub from New Caledonia), Nymphaeales (water lilies, together with some other aquatic plants) and Austrobaileyales (woody aromatic plants including star anise). The group may be expanded to include the Chloranthales and the Ceratophyllales.

ANITA stands for Amborella, Nymphaeales, I lliciales, Trimeniaceae, and Austrobaileya. Some authors have shortened this to ANA-grade for the three orders, Amborellales, Nymphaeales, and Austrobaileyales, since the order Iliciales was reduced to the family Illiciaceae and placed, along with the family Trimeniaceae, within the Austrobaileyales.

The basal angiosperms are only a few hundred species, compared with hundreds of thousands of species of eudicots, monocots, and magnoliids. They diverged from the ancestral angiosperm lineage before the five groups comprising the mesangiosperms diverged from each other.

== Phylogeny ==
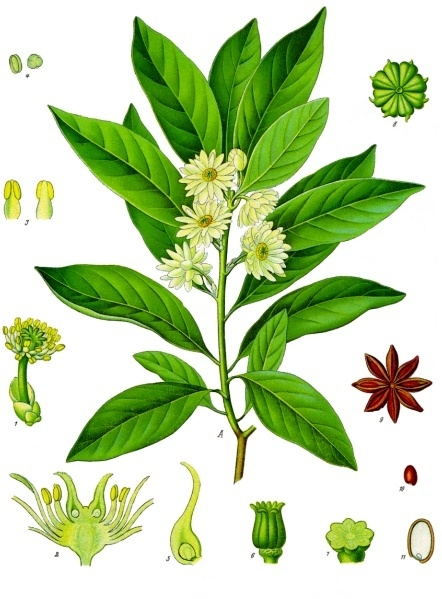
Japanese star anise (Illicium anisatum), from the Austrobaileyales

Amborella, Nymphaeales and Austrobaileyales, in that order, are basal to all other angiosperms. Amborella is understood to be the most basal extant flowering plant.

- Angiospermae
  - Amborella
  - - Nymphaeales
    - - Austrobaileyales
      - Mesangiospermae

== Older terms ==
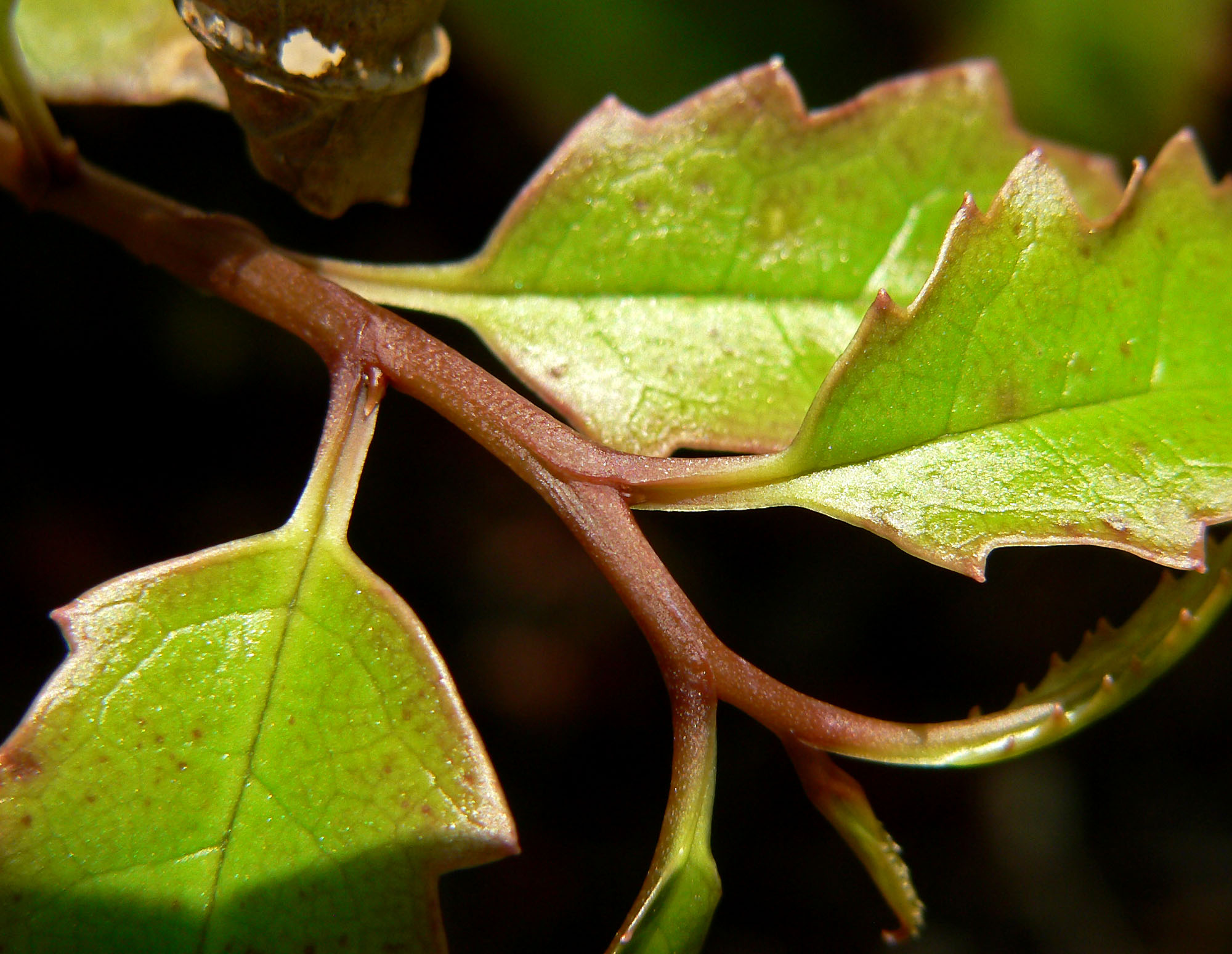
Amborella

Paleodicots (sometimes spelled "palaeodicots") is an informal name used by botanists (Spichiger & Savolainen 1997, Leitch et al. 1998) to refer to angiosperms which are not monocots or eudicots.

The paleodicots correspond to Magnoliidae sensu Cronquist 1981 (minus Ranunculales and Papaverales) and to Magnoliidae sensu Takhtajan 1980 (Spichiger & Savolainen 1997). Some of the paleodicots share apparently plesiomorphic characters with monocots, e.g., scattered vascular bundles, trimerous flowers, and non-tricolpate pollen.

The "paleodicots" are not a monophyletic group and the term has not been widely adopted. The APG II system does not recognize a group called "paleodicots" but assigns these early-diverging dicots to several orders and unplaced families: Amborellaceae, Nymphaeaceae (including Cabombaceae), Austrobaileyales, Ceratophyllales (not included among the "paleodicots" by Leitch et al. 1998), Chloranthaceae, and the magnoliid clade (orders Canellales, Piperales, Laurales, and Magnoliales). Subsequent research has added Hydatellaceae to the paleodicots.

The term paleoherb is another older term for flowering plants which are neither eudicots nor monocots.
