= Calyciflorae =

Historical grouping of plants

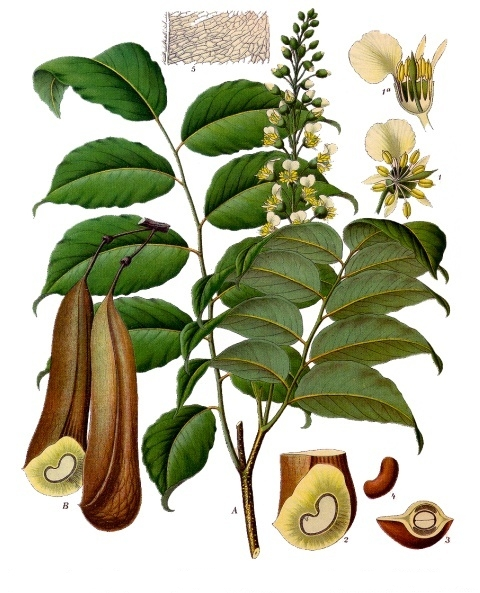
Myroxylon balsamum, a member of the family Fabaceae

Calyciflorae is a grouping of plants that is no longer used by botanists. Augustin Pyramus de Candolle defined it as a subclass within the class Dicotyledoneae. It overlapped largely with the modern Rosids group. The group Calyciflorae was defined as:

- Flowers with sepals united at least at the base (gamosepalous), a "torus" (disc) at the base of the calyx from which the petals and stamens appear to emerge, the ovary either free or attached to the calyx.

== See also ==
- De Candolle system
