= Dilleniidae =

Subclass of flowering plants

Dilleniidae is a botanical name at the rank of subclass. Circumscription of the subclass will vary with the taxonomic system being used; the only requirement being that it includes the family Dilleniaceae. A well-known system that uses this name is the Cronquist system, and in the original 1981 version of the system the circumscription was:

- subclass Dilleniidae
  order Dilleniales
  order Theales
  order Malvales
  order Lecythidales
  order Nepenthales
  order Violales
  order Salicales
  order Capparales
  order Batales
  order Ericales
  order Diapensiales
  order Ebenales
  order Primulales

Recent molecular systematic studies have shown that this group is polyphyletic. The APG II system does not use formal botanical names above the rank of order but assigns the plants involved to various orders in the asterids and rosids clades.
