= Aaron Goldberg (botanist) =

American botanist and parasitologist

- Born: November 4, 1917; Brooklyn, New York
- Died: December 13, 2014 (aged 97)
- Education: George Washington University
- Known for: Goldberg system, Spermatophytes
- Scientific career
- Fields: Botany
- Workplaces: US Department of Agriculture, National Museum of Natural History
- Author abbrev. (botany): Goldberg

Aaron Goldberg (November 4, 1917 – December 13, 2014) was an American botanist and parasitologist. He died in December 2014 at the Holy Cross Hospital in Silver Spring, Maryland, at the age of 97.

== Career ==
Ph.D. (1962) George Washington University He received his B.A. in 1939 from Brooklyn College, an M.S. in 1954 from De Paul University, and a Ph.D. from George Washington University in 1962. He worked for the US Department of Agriculture as a parasitologist till 1972. Since then he has been a Research Associate in Botany with the National Museum of Natural History (Smithsonian Institution) in Washington, D.C. Member of the Botanical Society of America.

== Achievements ==
He is best known for the Goldberg system, a treatise on the classification, evolution, and phylogeny of the Monocotyledon and Dicotyledons.

== Work ==
- Aaron Goldberg (1967). "The genus Melochia L. (Sterculiaceae)". Contributions from the United States National Herbarium, Vol. 34, pt. 5.
- Aaron Goldberg (1986). "Classification, Evolution and Phylogeny of the Families of Dicotyledons" (PDF). Smithsonian Contributions to Botany. 58: 1–314.
- Aaron Goldberg (1989). "Classification, Evolution and Phylogeny of the Families of Monocotyledons" (PDF). Smithsonian Contributions to Botany. 71: 1–73.
- Aaron Goldberg (2003). "Character Variation in Angiosperm Families" (PDF). Contributions from the United States National Herbarium. 47: 1–185.
- Aaron Goldberg and Harry A. Alden (2005). Taxonomy of Haptanthus Goldberg & C. Nelson, Systematic Botany, 30(4): pp. 773–778
- Aaron Goldberg. "Genus Melochia (Sterculiaceae)", Flora North America in press
