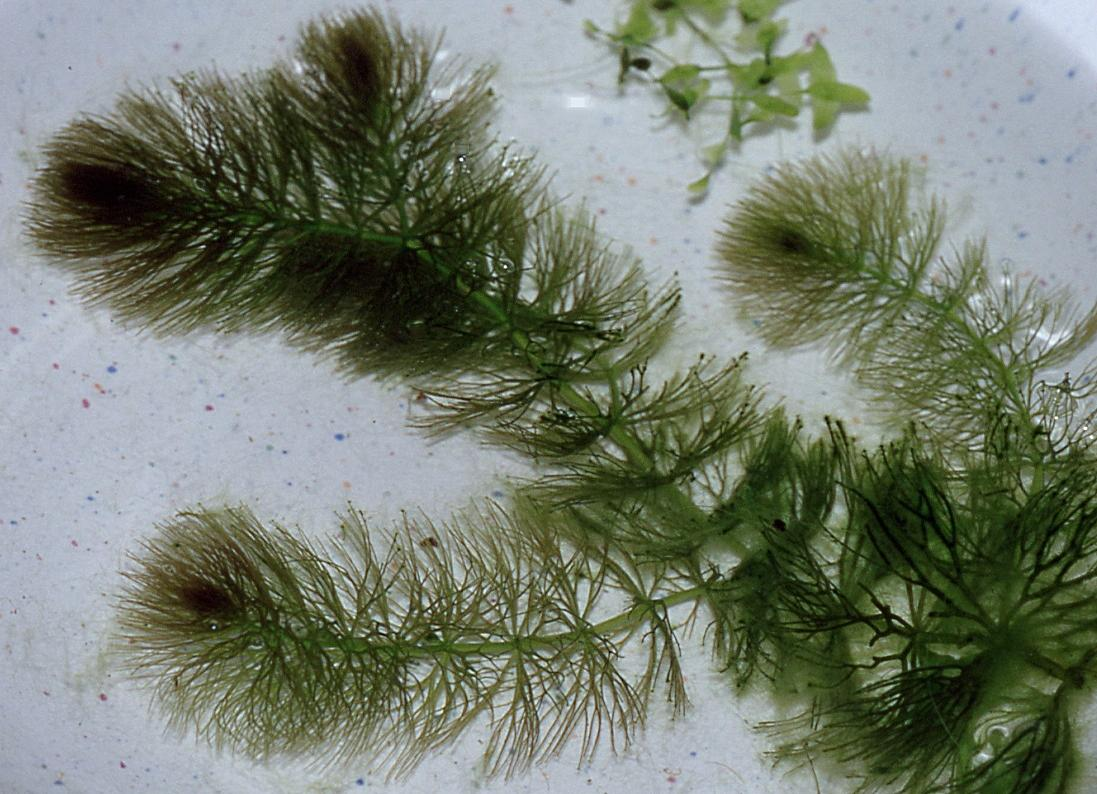
- Ceratophyllum submersum

Scientific classification
- Kingdom: Plantae
- Clade: Tracheophytes
- Clade: Angiosperms
- Order: Ceratophyllales
- Family: Ceratophyllaceae
- Genus: Ceratophyllum; L.

Type species
- Ceratophyllum demersum L.

Species
- See text

Synonyms
- Hydroceratophyllon Ség.; Dichotophyllum Moench; Revatophyllum Röhl.; Fassettia Mavrodiev

= Ceratophyllum =

Genus of aquatic flowering plants

Ceratophyllum (commonly known as coontails) are a cosmopolitan genus of flowering plants commonly found in ponds, marshes, and quiet streams in tropical and in temperate regions. It is the only extant genus in the family Ceratophyllaceae, itself the only extant family in the order Ceratophyllales. They are often called "hornworts", although the second name is also used for Anthocerotophytes (which have a distinctive horn-like sporophyte). Coontails lack anything resembling a horn, so to avoid confusion, calling them "hornworts" is strongly discouraged.

== Description ==
Ceratophyllum grows completely submerged, usually, though not always, floating on the surface of the water. The plant stems can reach 1–3 m in length. At intervals along nodes of the stem they produce rings of bright green leaves, which are narrow and often much-branched. The forked leaves are brittle and stiff to the touch in some species, softer in others. Roots are completely absent and are missing even in the embryonic stage, but sometimes they develop modified leaves with a rootlike appearance, which anchor the plant to the bottom. Stomata are not present on any species. The flowers are small and inconspicuous, with the male and female flowers on the same plant. In ponds it forms thick buds (turions) in the autumn, which sink to the bottom and give the impression that the plant has been killed by the frost; but come spring, these will grow back into the long stems, slowly filling up the pond.

== Taxonomy ==
Coontails were first described by Carl Linnaeus in 1753 with Ceratophyllum demersum as the type species. Ceratophyllum is considered distinctive enough to warrant its own family, Ceratophyllaceae, but was considered a relative of Nymphaeaceae and included in Nymphaeales in the Cronquist system. Recent research has shown that the plant is not closely related to Nymphaeaceae or any other extant plant family. Some early molecular phylogenies suggested it was the sister group to all other angiosperms, but more recent research suggests that it is the sister group to the eudicots. This notion was supported upon sequencing of the C. demersum genome in 2020. The APG IV system placed the family in its own order, the Ceratophyllales, and gives the following cladogram.

- angiosperms
  - Amborellales
  - - Nymphaeales
    - - Austrobaileyales
      - - magnoliids
        - Chloranthales
        - - monocots
          - - Ceratophyllales
            - eudicots

=== Species ===
More than 30 species of coontail have been described, but the specifics of how many are valid is yet to be settled. A narrow interpretation rejected over 23 of these taxa as variants, accepting only 7 species. This lumping was so severe that even creating subspecies was rejected. Defined this broadly, the genus has the following species:

- Ceratophyllum australe Griseb.
- Ceratophyllum demersum L. (rigid/common coontail) – cosmopolitan
- Ceratophyllum echinatum A.Gray (spiny coontail) – North America
- Ceratophyllum muricatum Cham. (prickly coontail) – Near-cosmopolitan
- Ceratophyllum platyacanthum Cham. – Europe and Asia
- Ceratophyllum submersum L. (soft/tropical coontail) – Europe, Middle-East, Central Asia, northern and central Africa, Florida, and Dominican Republic
- Ceratophyllum tanaiticum Sapjegin

=== Phylogeny ===
A 2018 phylogenetic analysis of the above species gives the below cladogram. It finds support for 4 species being monophyletic, while 3 others are paraphyletic. It found C. australe to be a divergent lineage of C. tanaiticum, rendering C. tanaiticum paraphyletic. Nonetheless, it still regards C. australe as a separate species due to significant morphological differences and its geographic isolation from the rest of C. tanaiticum. C. demersum and C. platyacanthum were recovered as paraphyletic with respect to each other, and as such they could possibly be considered one species, although their morphologies and ecologies are distinct.

- Ceratophyllum
  - C. echinatum
  - - C. demersum
    - C. platyacanthum
  - - - C. muricatum
      - C. submersum
    - - C. australe
      - C. tanaiticum
