= Lecythidales =

Order of flowering plants

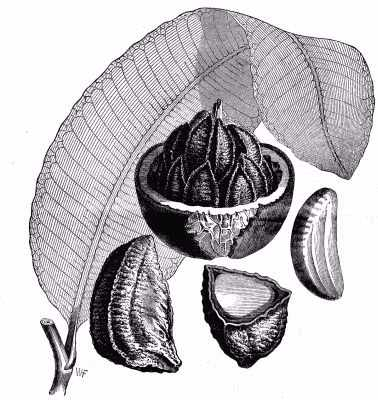

Lecythidales is a botanical name at the rank of order. The name was used by the Cronquist system for an order placed in subclass Dilleniidae. This order included only the family Lecythidaceae, which family now (in the APG II system) is placed in the order Ericales.
