= Capparales =

Order of plants

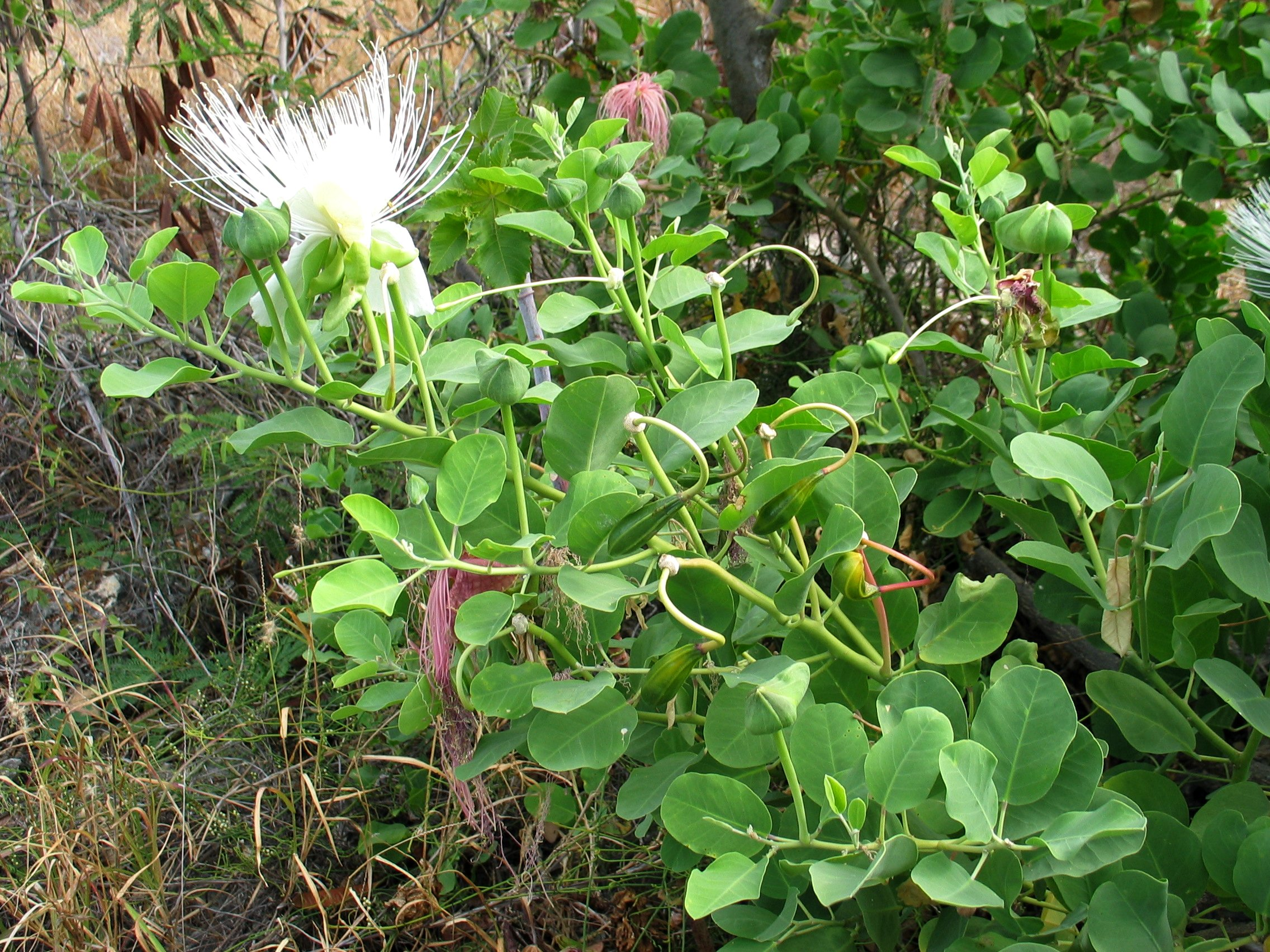
Capparis sandwichiana

Capparales is a botanical name of an order of flowering plants. It was used in the Cronquist system for an order in subclass Dilleniidae and in the Kubitzki system, nowadays. In the 1981 version of this system it included :

- order Capparales
  family Tovariaceae
  family Capparaceae
  family Brassicaceae
  family Moringaceae
  family Resedaceae

The APG II system includes all the plants involved in the (expanded) order Brassicales. For names above the rank of family the principle of priority is not obligatory, hence the difference between the two names.
