= Ebenales =

Order of flowering plants

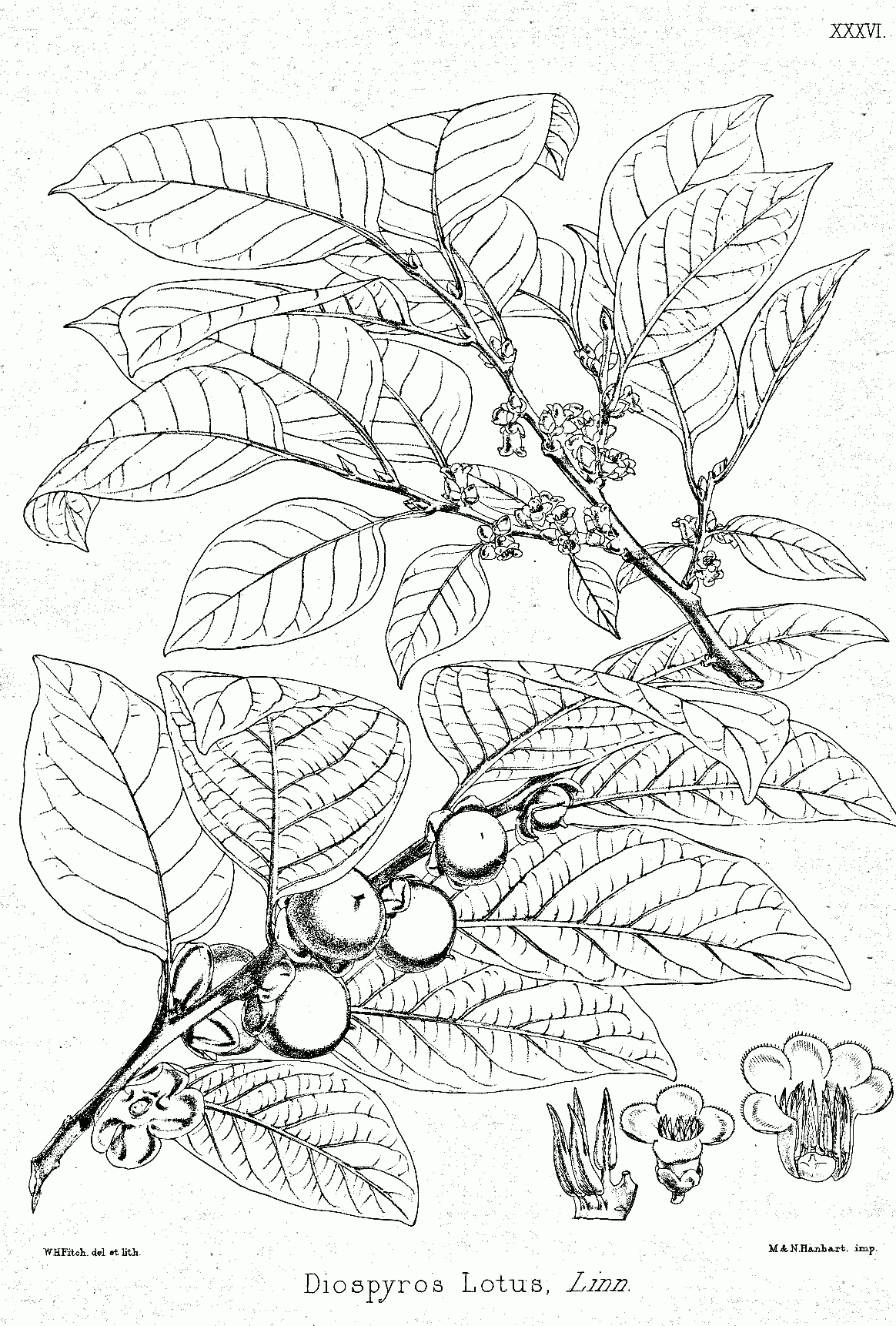
Diospyros lotus

Ebenales is an order of flowering plants. This order was recognized in several systems, for example the Bentham & Hooker system and the Engler system, although the Wettstein system preferred the name Diospyrales'. In the 1981 version of the Cronquist system it was an order placed in subclass Dilleniidae with the following circumscription:

- order Ebenales
  family Ebenaceae
  family Sapotaceae
  family Styracaceae
  family Symplocaceae

In the APG II system all the plants involved are assigned to the hugely expanded order Ericales.
