= Primulales =

Order of plants

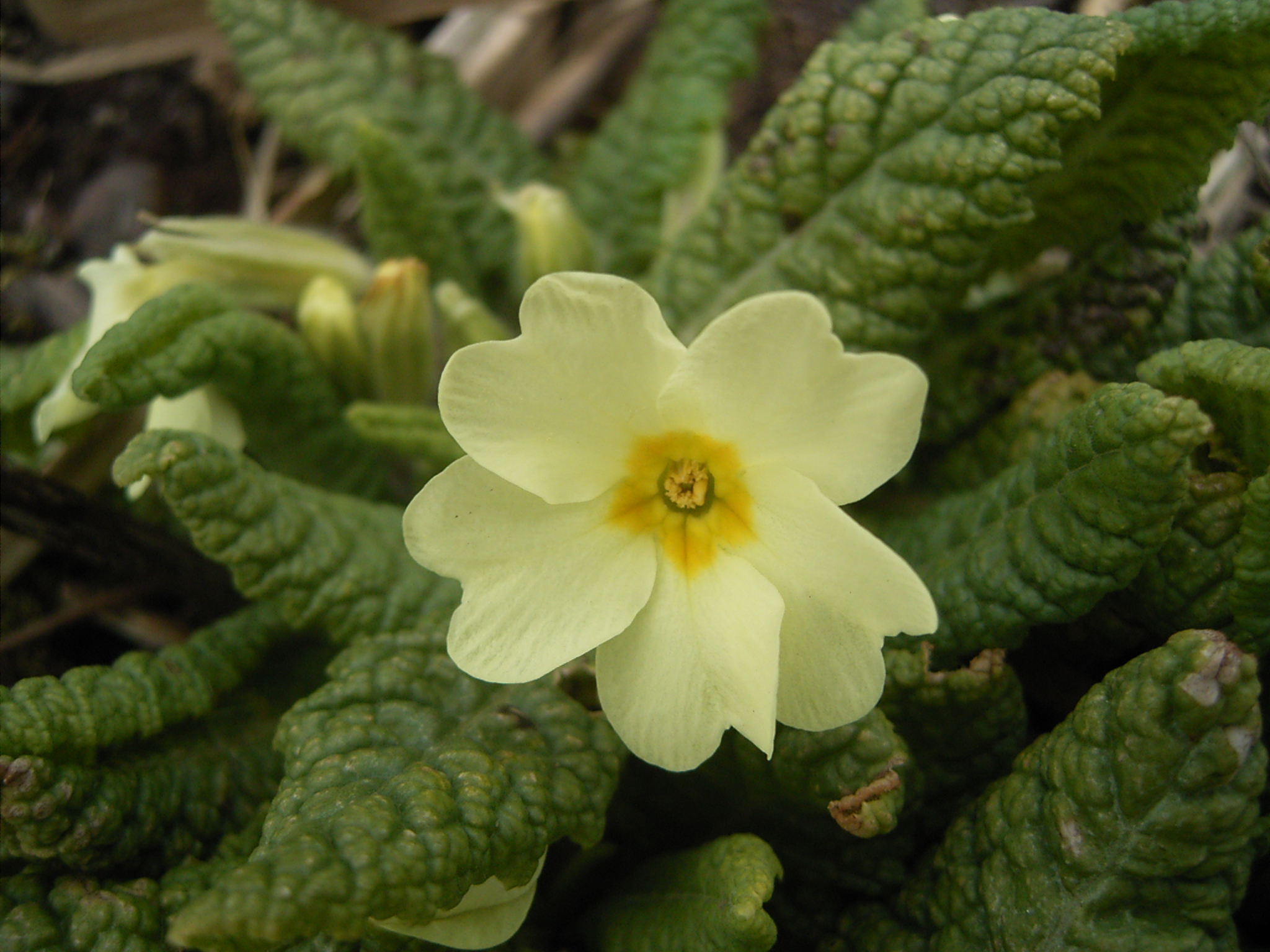
Primula vulgaris

Primulales was an order of flowering plants. This order was recognized in several systems with little variation in circumscription (see Bentham & Hooker, Engler and Wettstein system). In the classification system of Dahlgren the Primulales were in the superorder Primuliflorae (also called Primulanae). In the 1981 version of the Cronquist system it was an order placed in subclass Dilleniidae with the following circumscription:

- order Primulales
  family Myrsinaceae
  family Primulaceae
  family Theophrastaceae

The APG III system includes all the plants involved in the (expanded) order Ericales.
