= Theales =

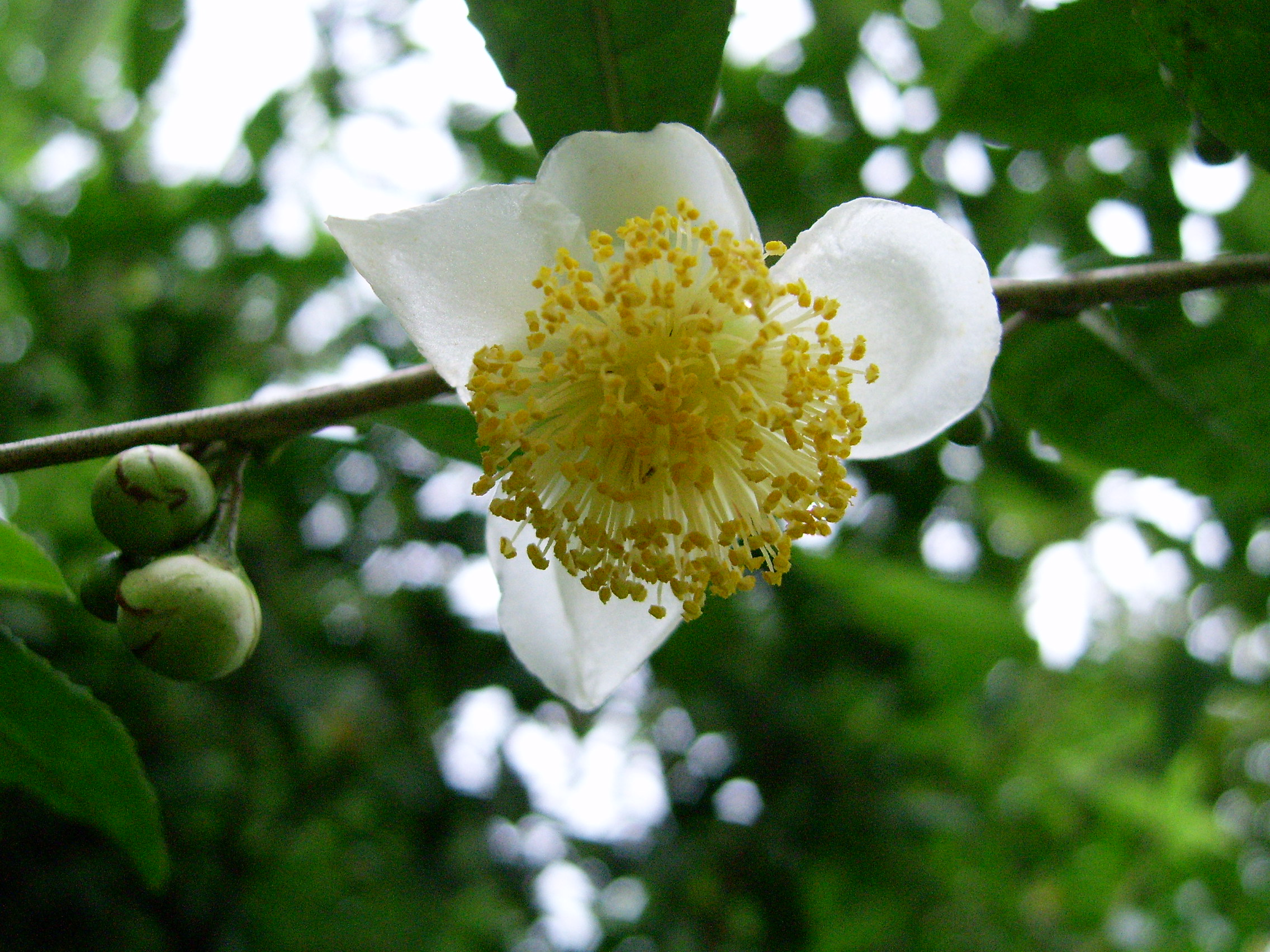

Theales is a botanical name at the rank of order. Early classifications such as that of Dahlgren placed the Theales in the superorder Theiflorae (also called Theanae). The name was used by the Cronquist system for an order placed in subclass Dilleniidae, in the 1981 version of the system the circumscription was:

- order Theales
  family Ochnaceae
  family Sphaerosepalaceae
  family Dipterocarpaceae
  family Caryocaraceae
  family Theaceae
  family Actinidiaceae
  family Scytopetalaceae
  family Pentaphylacaceae
  family Tetrameristaceae
  family Pellicieraceae
  family Oncothecaceae
  family Marcgraviaceae
  family Quiinaceae
  family Elatinaceae
  family Paracryphiaceae
  family Medusagynaceae
  family Clusiaceae

In the APG II system (used here) the taxa involved are assigned to many different orders, among which are Ericales, Malvales, and Malpighiales.
