= Batales =

Order of flowering plants

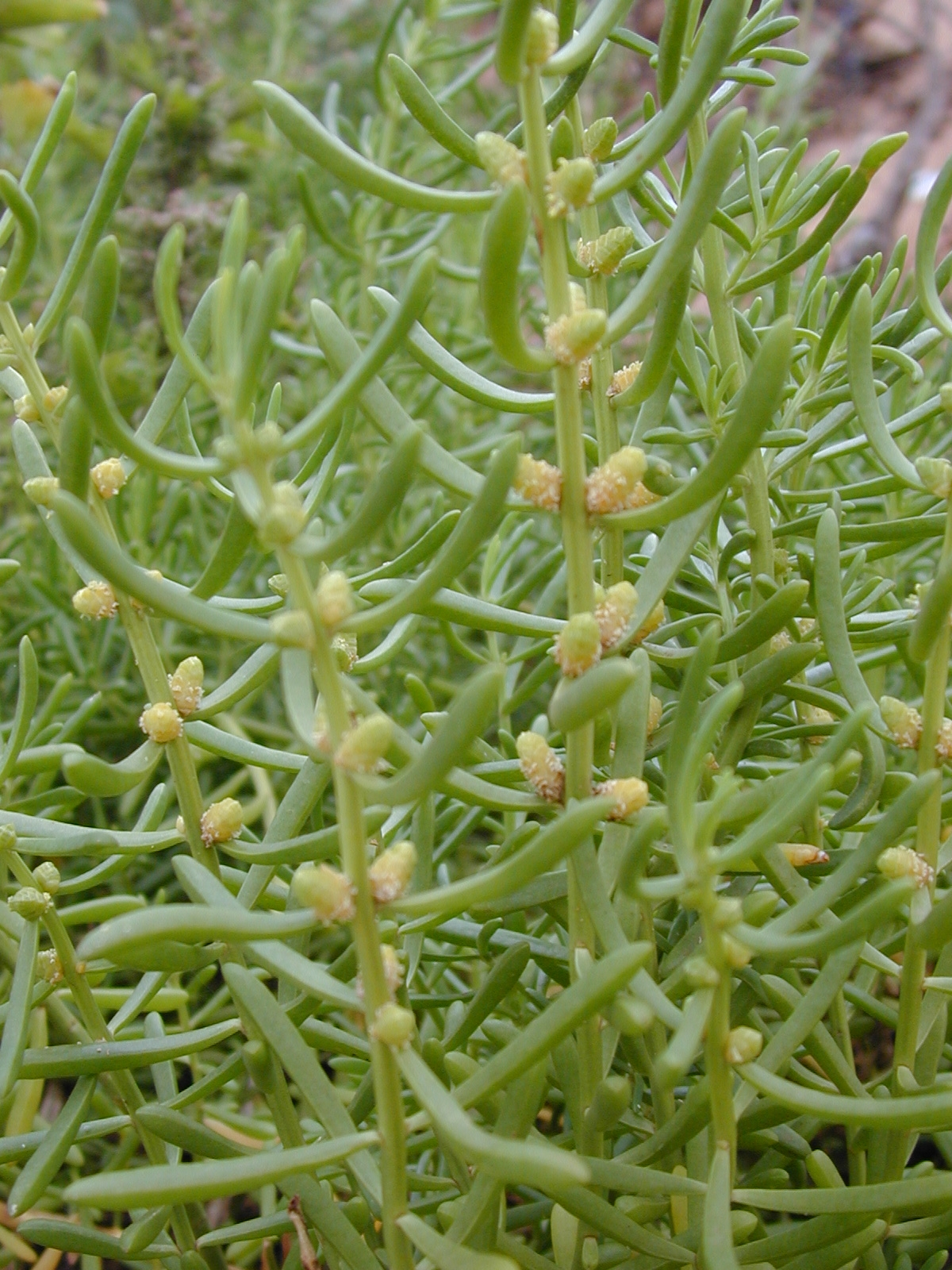
Batis maritima

Batales is a botanical name of an order of flowering plants. This name was used in several systems, sometimes in the spelling Batidales. Often this order consisted of the genus Batis only. In the 1981 version of the Cronquist system it was an order placed in subclass Dilleniidae with the following circumscription:

- order Batales
  family Gyrostemonaceae
  family Bataceae

The APG II system, used here, includes all the plants involved in the (expanded) order Brassicales.
