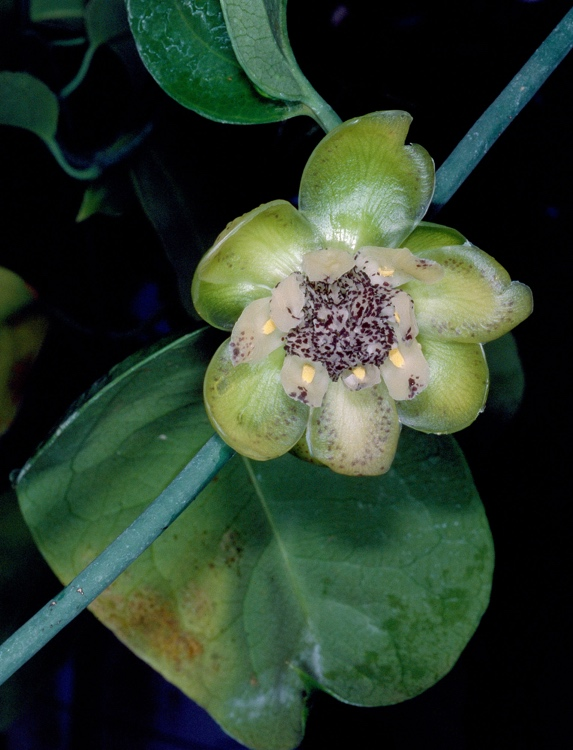

Conservation status
- Least Concern (NCA)

Scientific classification
- Kingdom: Plantae
- Clade: Tracheophytes
- Clade: Angiosperms
- Order: Austrobaileyales
- Family: Austrobaileyaceae; Croizat
- Genus: Austrobaileya; C.T.White
- Species: A. scandens

Binomial name
- Austrobaileya scandens C.T.White

Synonyms
- Austrobaileya maculata C.T.White

= Austrobaileya =

Genus of flowering plants

Austrobaileya is the sole genus in the plant family Austrobaileyaceae – the family is thus 'monotypic' as it includes a single child taxon. It is one of the basal angiosperm families, the most ancient group of flowering plants. The genus is also monotypic, containing the single species Austrobaileya scandens. The species is endemic to the Wet Tropics bioregion of Queensland, Australia, where it occurs in well-developed upland rainforest. It was first described in 1933.

== Description ==
Austrobaileya plants grow as woody lianas or vines. Their main growing stems loosely twine, with straight, extending, leafy branches. The leaves are leathery, veined and simple. The leaves produce essential oils in spherical ethereal oil cells. Their foliage is damaged by oxidation in direct sunlight, so it tends to grow beneath the rainforest canopy, in low-sunlight and very humid conditions. Like many other flowering plants growing in the understory of tropical rainforest, it does not have palisade mesophyll tissue or low leaf photosynthetic rates. It relies strongly on vegetative reproduction for continuation of the species.

== Austrobaileya scandens ==
Austrobaileya scandens is a rare species found only (endemic) in the Wet Tropics rainforests of Queensland. It is the oldest species of flowering plants in Australia that requires pollination. Austrobaileya is one of many ancient ('basal') plants found in Wet Tropics that have survived millions of years of climatic and geological changes.

The species is well adapted to rainforests, where it can wind around tall woody trees that form the canopy. It is evolved for fitness in the wet tropical rainforest’s conditions of dampness, humidity, high-light canopy and low-light understory.

It can grow up to 15 metres (49 ft) tall. The plant has a distinctive blue-green colour foliage. Austrobaileya has large and solitary flowers that are arranged in a spiral with pale green petals. The five or so large sepals are yellowish-green, and larger than the five or so green petals. Flowers are pollinated by flies. To attract pollinators, A. scandens’ flowers release a rotting fish smell.

Their fruits are apricot-coloured and contain tightly packed seeds, similar in shape to chestnuts. The fruit is shaped like a pear or eggplant. Fruits have been known to grow to sizes of 7 centimetres (2.8 in) in length by 5 centimetres (2.0 in).

== Family Austrobaileyaceae classification ==
The APG IV system, of 2016 (and the earlier 2009 APG III system and 2003 APG II system), recognise Austrobaileyaceae, placing it in the order Austrobaileyales. Austrobaileyales is accepted as being among the most basal lineages in the clade angiosperms.

The Cronquist system, of 1981, assigned the family to the order Magnoliales, in subclass Magnoliidae, in class Magnoliopsida [=dicotyledons] of division Magnoliophyta [=angiosperms].

The Thorne system (1992) placed it in the order Magnoliales, which was assigned to superorder Magnolianae, in subclass Magnoliideae [=dicotyledons], in class Magnoliopsida [=angiosperms].

The Dahlgren system assigned it to the order Annonales, which was placed in superorder Magnolianae, in subclass Magnoliideae [=dicotyledons], in class Magnoliopsida [=angiosperms].

The Engler system, in its update of 1964, assigned it to the order Magnoliales, which was placed in subclass Archychlamydeae in class Dicotyledoneae and in subdivision Angiospermae.
