= Nepenthales =

Order of carnivorous plants

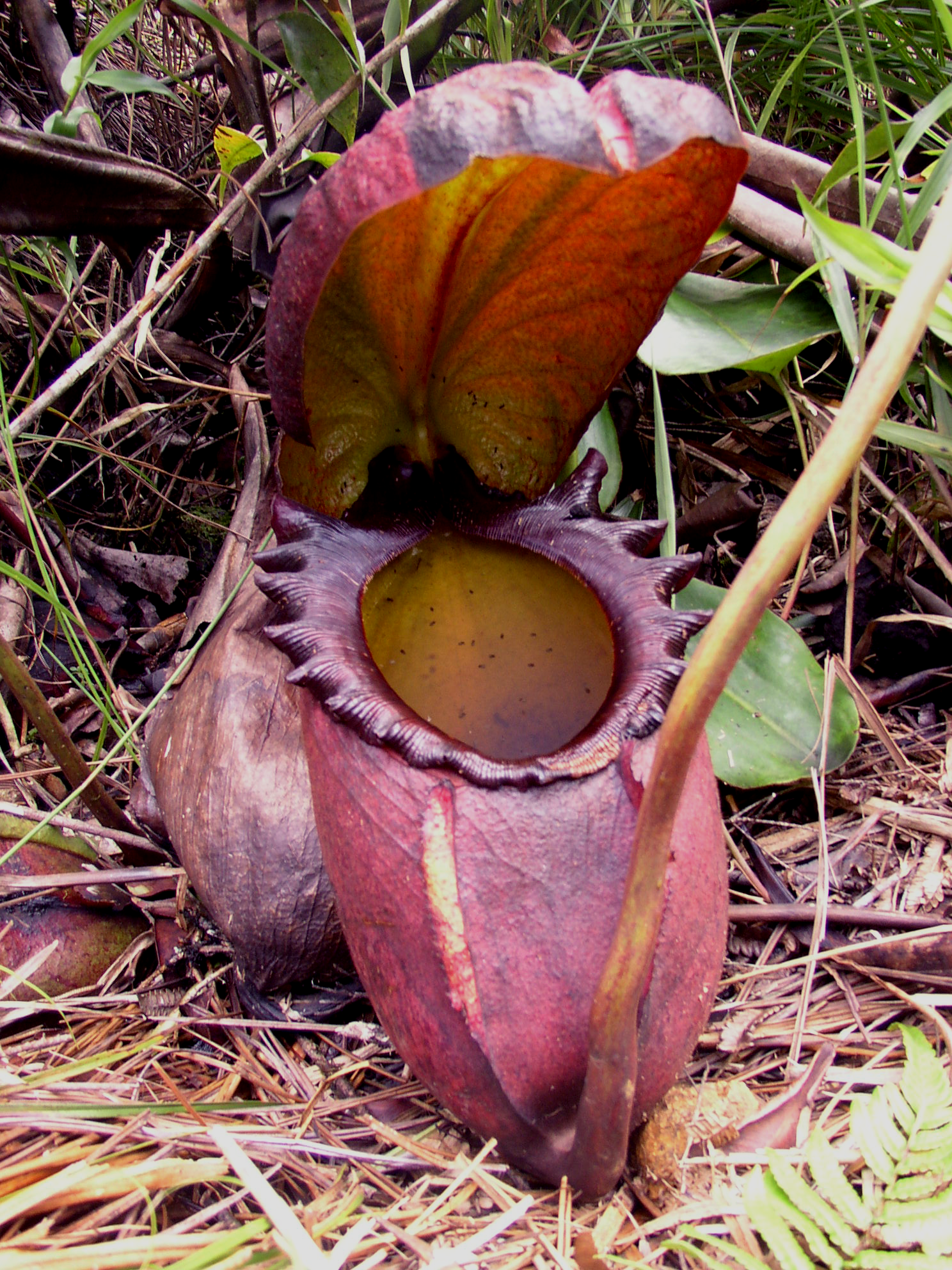
Nepenthes rajah

Nepenthales (Nepenthales Bercht. & J.Presl) is an order of carnivorous flowering plants in the Cronquist system of plant classification.

== Taxonomy ==
The order Nepenthales as of 2018 is a clade within Caryophyllales and contains the following families:

=== Carnivorous Nepenthales ===
- Droseraceae
- Nepenthaceae
- Ancistrocladaceae
- Drosophyllaceae
- Dioncophyllaceae

=== Non-carnivorous Nepenthales ===
- Polygonaceae
- Frankeniaceae
- Plumbaginaceae
- Tamaricaceae

== Evolution within Nepenthales ==
Common traits of the Nepenthales include the presence of glandular hairs or active secretory tissues. The presence of these glandular hairs and secretory tissues is believed to be important to the evolution of carnivory within Nepenthales. Carnivory within the Nepenthales is believed to have only evolved once with the carnivorous lineage diverging from the rest of the Nepenthales around 95.1Mya in the late Cretaceous.

== APG IV system ==
Plant taxonomy systematists currently favor the APG IV system of 2016 over the older Cronquist system for classifying flowering plants (Angiosperms).

The 2009 APG III system assigned the first two families to the order Caryophyllales and the last family to the order Ericales.
