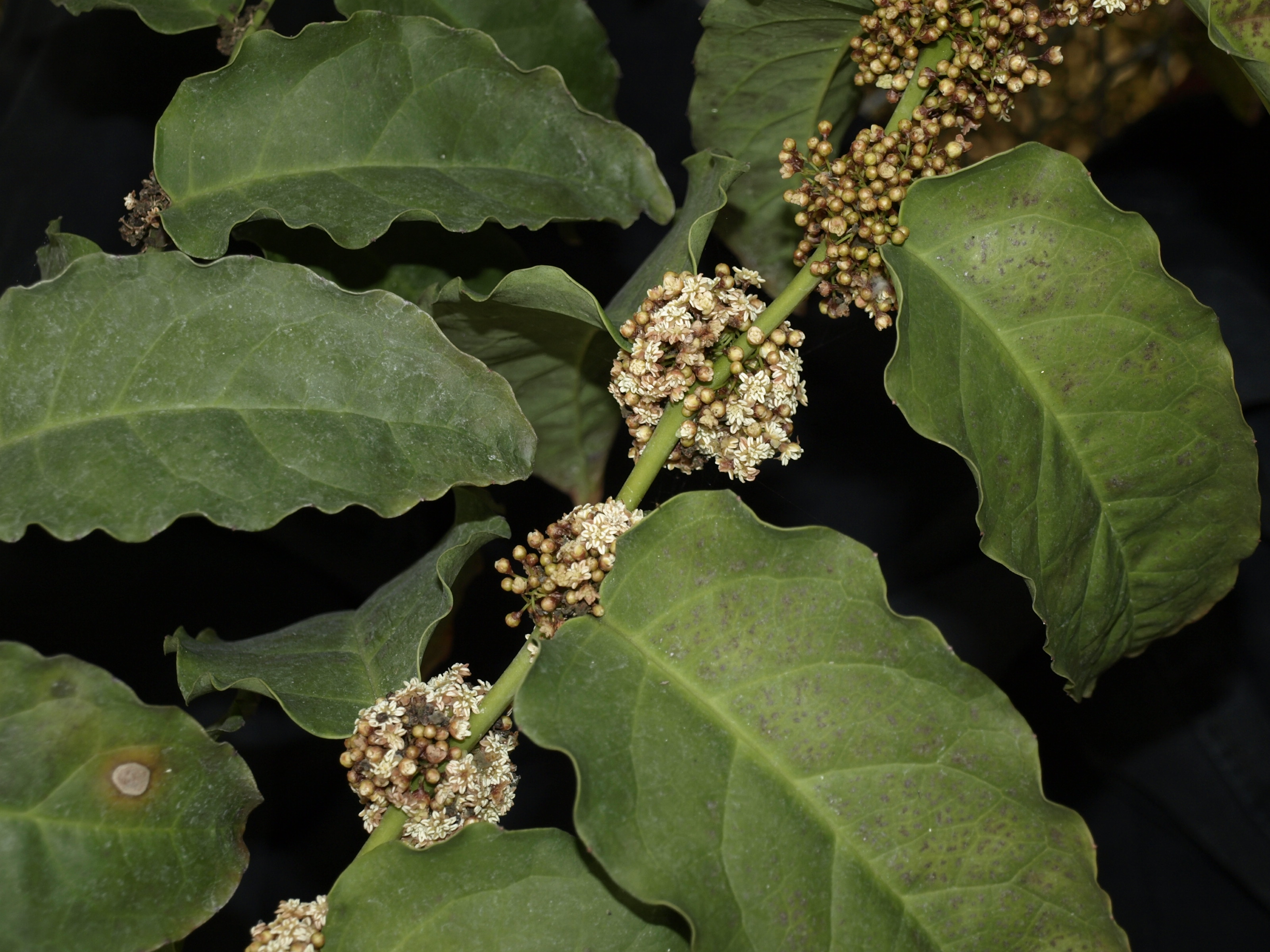
- Male specimen

Conservation status
- Least Concern (IUCN 3.1)

Scientific classification
- Kingdom: Plantae
- Clade: Tracheophytes
- Clade: Angiosperms
- Order: Amborellales; Melikyan, A.V.Bobrov, & Zaytzeva
- Family: Amborellaceae; Pichon
- Genus: Amborella; Baill.
- Species: A. trichopoda

Binomial name
- Amborella trichopoda Baill.
- It is endemic to New Caledonia

= Amborella =

Species of flowering plant

Amborella is a monotypic genus of understory shrubs or small trees endemic to the main island, Grande Terre, of New Caledonia in the southwest Pacific Ocean. The genus is the only member of the family Amborellaceae and the order Amborellales and contains a single species, Amborella trichopoda. Amborella is of great interest to plant systematists because molecular phylogenetic analyses consistently place it as the sister group to all other flowering plants; as a result, it is critical for understanding angiosperm evolution. It is understood to be the most basal extant flowering plant, and is one of several groups treated as "basal angiosperms".

== Description ==
Amborella is a sprawling shrub or small tree up to 8 metres (26 feet) high. It bears alternate, simple evergreen leaves without stipules. The leaves are two-ranked, with distinctly serrated or rippled margins, and about 8 to 10 centimetres (3 to 4 inches) long.

Amborella has xylem tissue that differs from that of most other flowering plants. The xylem of Amborella contains only tracheids; vessel elements are absent. Xylem of this form has long been regarded as a primitive feature of flowering plants.

The species is dioecious. This means that each plant produces either male flowers (meaning that they have functional stamens) or female flowers (flowers with functional carpels), but not both. At any one time, a dioecious plant produces only functionally staminate or functionally carpellate flowers. Staminate ("male") Amborella flowers do not have carpels, whereas the carpellate ("female") flowers have non-functional "staminodes", structures resembling stamens in which no pollen develops. Plants may change from one reproductive morphology to the other. In one study, seven cuttings from a staminate plant produced, as expected, staminate flowers at their first flowering, but three of the seven produced carpellate flowers at their second flowering.

The small, creamy white flowers are arranged in inflorescences borne in the axils of foliage leaves. The inflorescences have been described as cymes, with up to three orders of branching, each branch being terminated by a flower. Each flower is subtended by bracts. The bracts transition into a perianth of undifferentiated tepals. The tepals typically are arranged in a spiral, but sometimes are whorled at the periphery.

Carpellate flowers are roughly 3 to 4 millimetres (1/8 to 3/16 in) in diameter, with 7 or 8 tepals. There are 1 to 3 (or rarely 0) well-differentiated staminodes and a spiral of 4 to 8 free (apocarpous) carpels. Carpels bear green ovaries; they lack a style. They contain a single ovule with the micropyle directed downwards. Staminate flowers are approximately 4 to 5 mm in diameter, with 6 to 15 tepals. These flowers bear 10 to 21 spirally arranged stamens, which become progressively smaller toward the center. The innermost may be sterile, amounting to staminodes. The stamens bear triangular anthers on short broad filaments. An anther consists of four pollen sacs, two on each side, with a small sterile central connective. The anthers have connective tips with small bumps and may be covered with secretions. These features suggest that, as with other basal angiosperms, there is a high degree of developmental plasticity.

Typically, 1 to 3 carpels per flower develop into fruit. The fruit is an ovoid red drupe (approximately 5 to 7 mm long and 5 mm wide) borne on a short (1 to 2 mm) stalk. The remains of the stigma can be seen at the tip of the fruit. The skin is papery, surrounding a thin fleshy layer containing a red juice. The inner pericarp is lignified and surrounds the single seed. The embryo is small and surrounded by copious endosperm.

Amborella has a mixed pollination system, relying on both insect pollinators and wind.

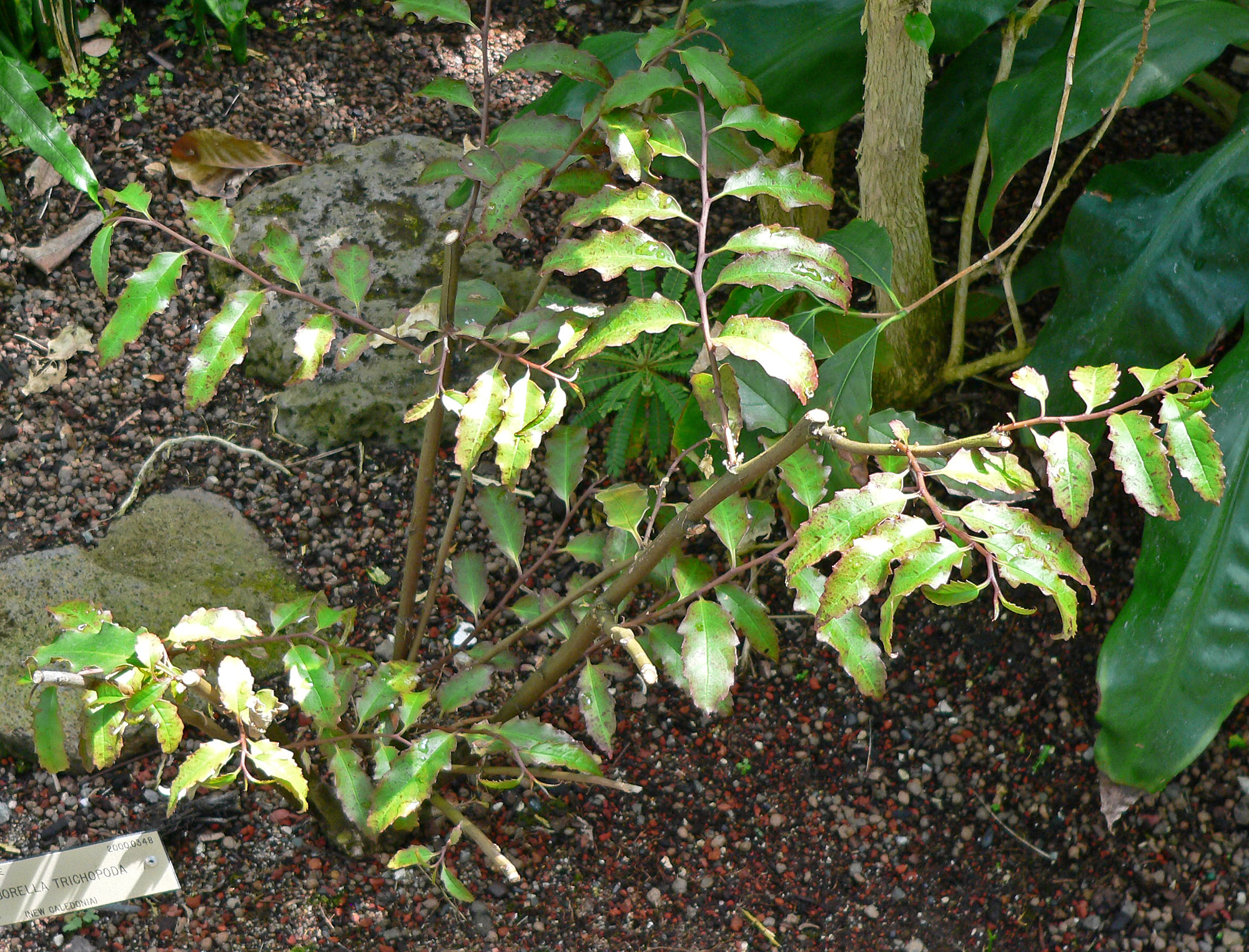
Specimen in Berkeley, California

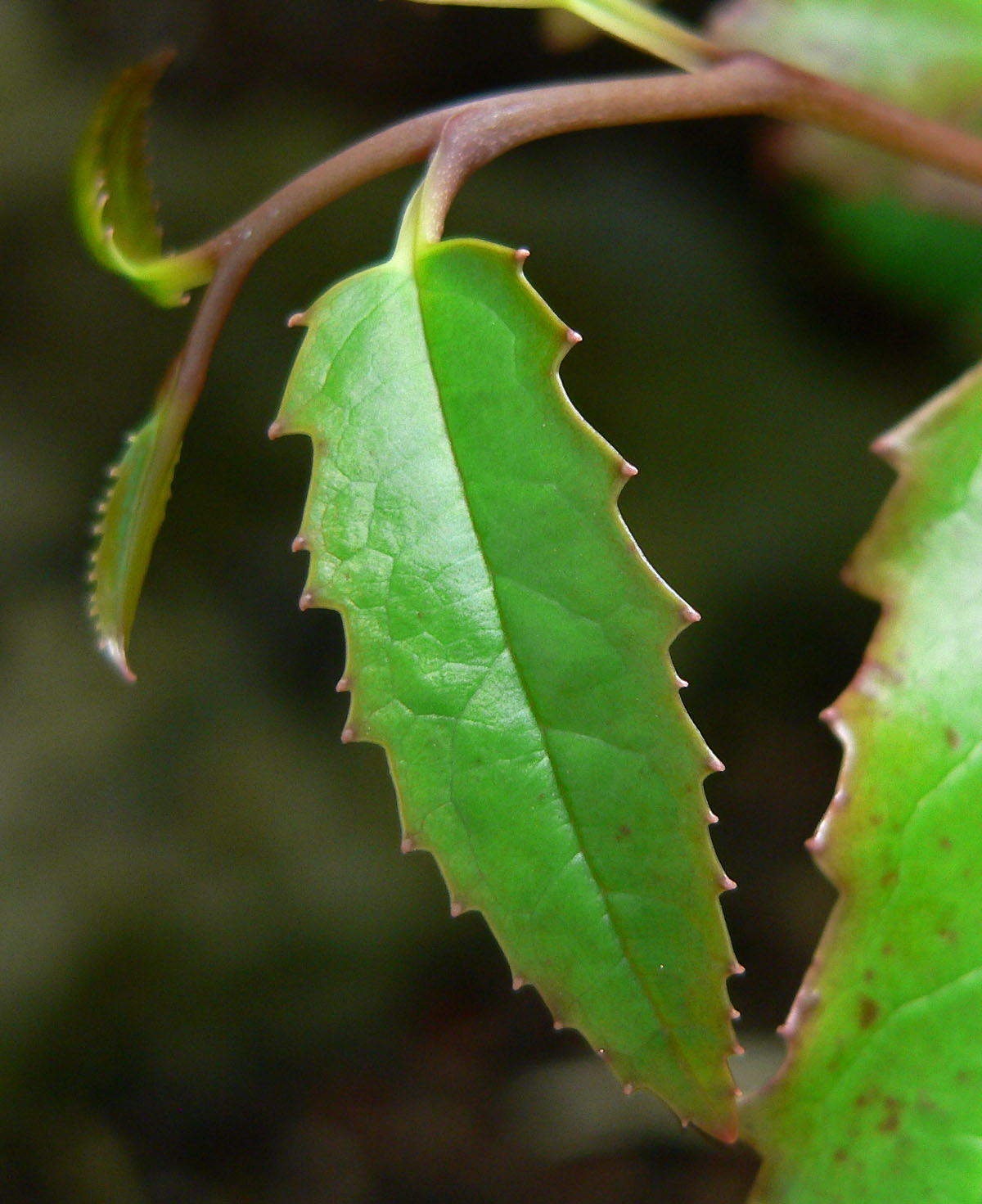
Young leaves

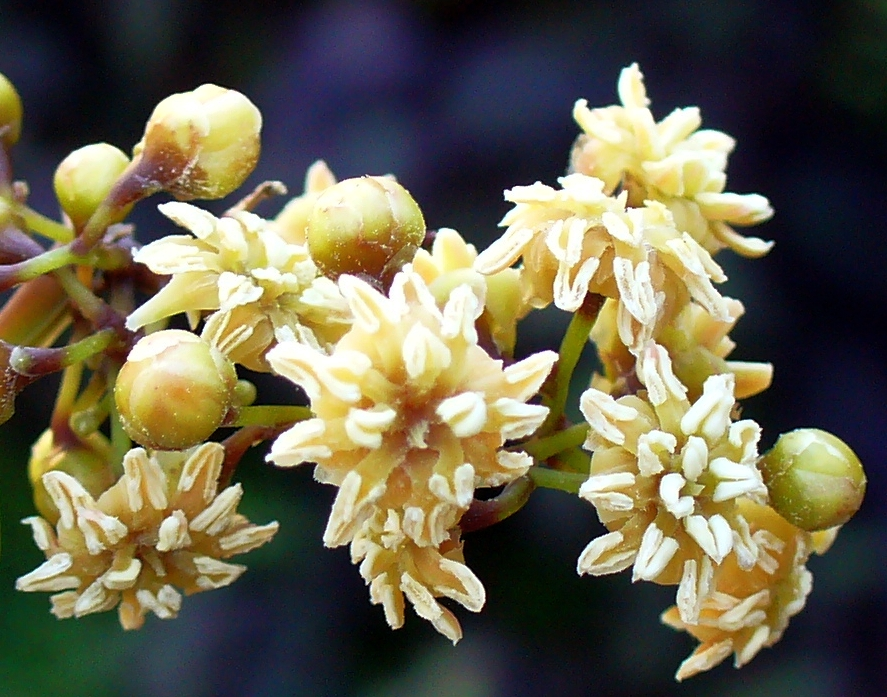
Buds and staminate (male) flowers

Diagram of a female flower with 5 carpels and 2 staminodes

== Taxonomy ==
=== History ===
The Cronquist system, of 1981, classified the family:

Order Laurales

Subclass Magnoliidae

Class Magnoliopsida [=dicotyledons]

Division Magnoliophyta [=angiosperms]

The Thorne system (1992) classified it:

Order Magnoliales

Superorder Magnolianae

Subclass Magnoliideae [=dicotyledons]

Class Magnoliopsida [=angiosperms]

The Dahlgren system, of 1980, classified it:

Order Laurales

Superorder Magnolianae

Subclass Magnoliideae [=dicotyledons],

Class Magnoliopsida [=angiosperms].

=== Modern classification ===
Amborella is the only genus in the family Amborellaceae. The APG II system recognized this family, but left it unplaced at order rank due to uncertainty about its relationship to the family Nymphaeaceae. In the more recent APG systems, APG III and APG IV, the Amborellaceae comprise the monotypic order Amborellales at the base of the angiosperm phylogeny.

=== Phylogeny ===
Currently plant systematists accept Amborella trichopoda as sister to all other angiosperms. Thus, the features of early flowering plants can be inferred by comparing derived traits shared by angiosperms other than Amborella, and absent in Amborella; these traits are presumed to have evolved after the divergence of the Amborella lineage.

One early 20th century idea of "primitive" (i.e. ancestral) floral traits in angiosperms, accepted until relatively recently, is the Magnolia blossom model. This envisions flowers with numerous parts arranged in spirals on an elongated, cone-like receptacle rather than the small numbers of parts in distinct whorls of more derived flowers.

In 2005, the Floral Genome Project used chloroplast genes and expressed sequence tags for floral genes to clarify relationships between well-studied model plants such as Arabidopsis thaliana, and lineages including Amborella, Nuphar (Nymphaeaceae), Illicium, the monocots, and the eudicots. The project explicitly included phylogenetically basal angiosperms to generate insights into the genetics of the earliest flowering plants. The work generated the cladogram shown below.

- extant seed plants
  - Acrogymnosperms
  - angiosperms
    - Amborella
    - - Nuphar
      - - Illicium
        - - monocots
          - magnoliids
          - eudicots

This hypothesized relationship of the extant seed plants places Amborella as the sister taxon to all other angiosperms, and shows the gymnosperms as a monophyletic group sister to the angiosperms. It supports the theory that Amborella branched off from the main lineage of angiosperms before the ancestors of any other living angiosperms. There is however some uncertainty about the relationship between the Amborellaceae and the Nymphaeales: one theory is that the Amborellaceae alone are the monophyletic sister to the extant angiosperms; another proposes that the Amborellaceae and Nymphaeales form a clade that is the sister group to all other extant angiosperms.

Because of its evolutionary position sister to all other angiosperms, there was support for sequencing the complete genome of Amborella trichopoda to serve as a reference for evolutionary studies. In 2010, the US National Science Foundation began a genome sequencing effort in Amborella, and the draft genome sequence was posted on the project website in December 2013.

==== Genomic and evolutionary considerations ====
Amborella is of great interest to plant systematists because molecular phylogenetic analyses consistently place it as the sister group to all other angiosperms. That is, the Amborellaceae represent a line of flowering plants that diverged very early on (more than 130 million years ago) from all the other extant species of flowering plants, and, among extant flowering plants, is the sister group to the other flowering plants. Comparing characteristics of this species, other flowering plants, and fossils may provide clues about how flowers first appeared—what Darwin called the "abominable mystery". This position is consistent with a number of conservative characteristics of its physiology and morphology; for example, the wood of Amborella lacks the vessels characteristic of most flowering plants. The genes responsible for floral traits like scent and colors in other angiosperms, have yet to be found. Further, the female gametophyte of Amborella contains eight cells, one cell more than the seven-celled Polygonum-type female gametophyte found in the majority of angiosperms.

Amborella, being an understory plant in the wild, is commonly in intimate contact with shade- and moisture-dependent organisms such as algae, lichens and mosses. In those circumstances, some horizontal gene transfer between Amborella and such associated species is not surprising in principle, but the scale of such transfer has caused considerable surprise. Sequencing the Amborella mitochondrial genome revealed that for every gene of its own origin, it contains about six versions from the genomes of an assortment of the plants and algae growing with or upon it, including a New Caledonian endemic parasitic plant Hachettea. Although the parasite-host relationship between Amborella and Hachettea has yet to be confirmed in the field. The evolutionary and physiological significance of this is not as yet clear, nor in particular is it clear whether the horizontal gene transfer has anything to do with the apparent stability and conservatism of the species.

== Conservation ==
The islands of New Caledonia are a biodiversity hot-spot, preserving many early diverging lineages of plants, of which Amborella is but one. This preservation has been ascribed to climate stability during and since the Tertiary (66 to 3 million years ago), stability that has permitted the continued survival of tropical forests on New Caledonia. In contrast, drought conditions dominated the Australian climate towards the end of the Tertiary. Current threats to biodiversity in New Caledonia include fires, mining, agriculture, invasion by introduced species, urbanization and global warming. The importance of conserving Amborella has been dramatically stated by Pillon: "The disappearance of Amborella trichopoda would imply the disappearance of a genus, a family and an entire order, as well as the only witness to at least 140 million years of evolutionary history." Conservation strategies targeted on relict species are recommended, both preserving a diversity of habitats in New Caledonia and ex situ conservation in cultivation. The IUCN conservation status is Least Concern (LC).
