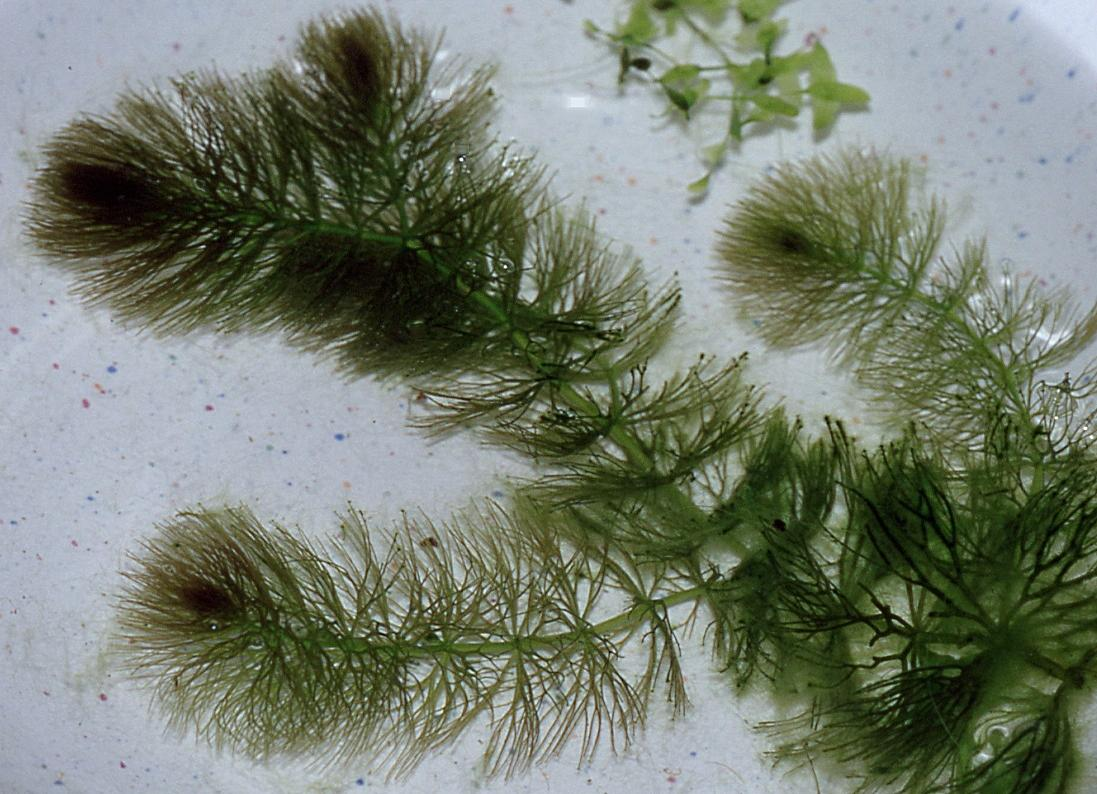
- Ceratophyllum submersum

Scientific classification
- Kingdom: Plantae
- Clade: Tracheophytes
- Clade: Angiosperms
- Order: Ceratophyllales; Link
- Family: Ceratophyllaceae; Gray

Genera
- Ceratophyllum; †Ceratostratiotes; †Donlesia

= Ceratophyllaceae =

Ceratophyllaceae Temporal range: Albian? - Recent

Family of aquatic plants

Ceratophyllaceae is a cosmopolitan family of flowering plants including one living genus commonly found in ponds, marshes, and quiet streams in tropical and in temperate regions. It is the only extant family in the order Ceratophyllales. Species are commonly called coontails or hornworts, although hornwort is also used for unrelated plants of the division Anthocerotophyta.

Living Ceratophyllum grows completely submerged, usually, though not always, floating on the surface, and does not tolerate drought.

== Taxonomy ==
Ceratophyllaceae was considered a relative of Nymphaeaceae and included in Nymphaeales in the Cronquist system, but research has shown that it is not closely related to Nymphaeaceae or any other extant plant family. Some early molecular phylogenies suggested it was the sister group to all other angiosperms, but more recent research suggests that it is the sister group to the eudicots. The APG III system placed the family in its own order, the Ceratophyllales. The APG IV system accepts the phylogeny shown below:

- angiosperms
  - Amborellales
  - - Nymphaeales
    - - Austrobaileyales
      - - magnoliids
        - Chloranthales
        - - monocots
          - - Ceratophyllales
            - eudicots

The extinct family Montsechiaceae containing the genus Montsechia has also been placed in the order Ceratophyllales.

=== Genera ===
The family contains one living genus, and several extinct genera described from the fossil record, including one of the earliest fruit bearing (in the form of an achene) plants, the Dakota formation freshwater genus Donlesia from Early Cretaceous.

- Ceratophyllum
- †Ceratostratiotes
- †Donlesia
