= List of early-diverging flowering plant families =

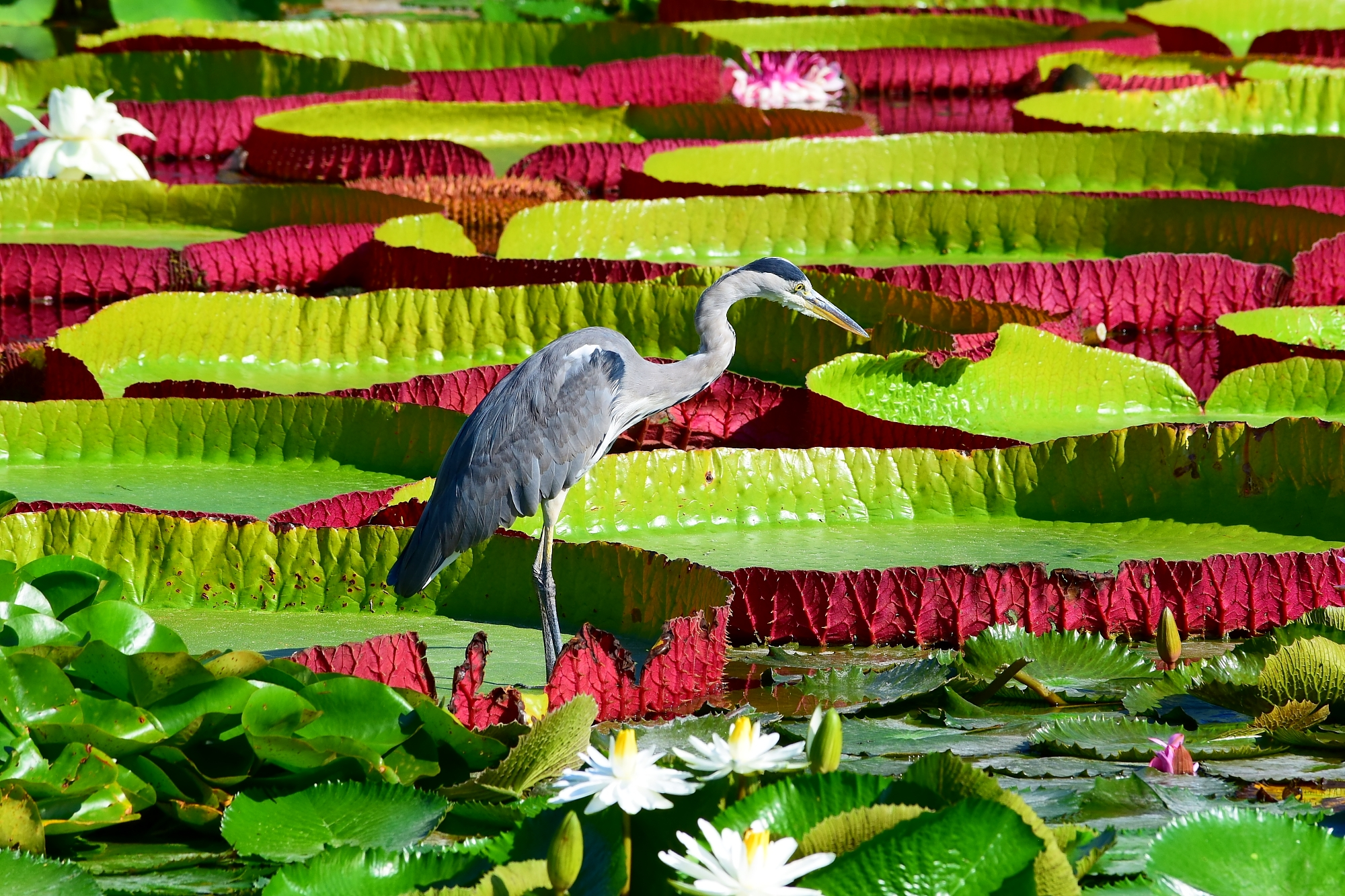
Victoria amazonica and a heron

There are 27 families of flowering plants whose earliest ancestors diverged from what became the two most prominent groups of flowering plants, the eudicots and monocots. (Note: The taxonomy (classification) in this list follows Plants of the World (2017) and the fourth Angiosperm Phylogeny Group system. Total counts of genera for each family come from Plants of the World Online. (See the POWO license.) Extinct taxa are not included.) They are quite diverse, with woody and non-woody plants, evergreen and deciduous shrubs and trees, and plants that grow in soil, in water and on other plants.

Victoria amazonica has the largest undivided leaf of any plant, up to 2.65 m (8 ft 8 in) in diameter. The parasitic genera Hydnora and Prosopanche are the only flowering plants with no evidence of leaves or scales. Myristica fragrans, the source of nutmeg, was important in the 17th-century spice trade. Amborella may represent the earliest-diverging order of flowering plants.

== Glossary ==
From the glossary of botanical terms:

- annual: a plant species that completes its life cycle within a single year or growing season
- basal: attached close to the base (of a plant or an evolutionary tree diagram)
- herbaceous: not woody; usually green and soft in texture
- perennial: not an annual or biennial
- scale: a reduced leaf or a flattened outgrowth
- woody: hard and lignified; not herbaceous

The APG IV system, the fourth in a series of plant taxonomies from the Angiosperm Phylogeny Group, places the early-diverging families in nine orders. Canellales, Laurales, Magnoliales and Piperales are grouped together as the magnoliid orders, with Chloranthales as a sister group. Amborellales, Nymphaeales and Austrobaileyales are the basal angiosperms or the ANA grade. Ceratophyllales may have been the last of the nine orders to diverge, but some fossil evidence links it to the older order Chloranthales.

== Families ==
Families
Family and a common name (Note: Each family's formal name ends in the Latin suffix -aceae and is derived from the name of a genus that is or once was part of the family.)	Type genus and etymology (Note: Some plants were named for naturalists (unless otherwise noted).)	Total genera; global distribution	Description and uses	Order	Type genus images
Amborellaceae (Amborella family)	Amborella, from a Malagasy plant name	1 genus, in New Caledonia only	Just one species, Amborella trichopoda, of evergreen shrubs and trees. The wood resembles the softwood of conifers, rather than hardwood.	Amborellales	Amborella trichopoda
Annonaceae (soursop family)	Annona, from a Taíno plant name	111 genera, throughout the tropics, with 2 genera in eastern North America	Shrubs, large trees and woody vines with fibrous bark. Several Annona and Asimina species are grown for their fruit, and Cananga odorata is used in perfumes.	Magnoliales	Annona muricata
Aristolochiaceae (birthwort family)	Aristolochia, from Greek for "best childbirth"	8 genera, worldwide	Herbaceous perennials with rhizomes, shrubs, small trees and woody vines. Some Aristolochia, Asarum and Saruma species can be grown as garden ornamentals.	Piperales	Aristolochia rotunda
Atherospermataceae (southern-sassafras family)	Atherosperma, from Greek for "awned seeds" or "pointed fruit"	6 genera, in and around the South Pacific	Scented shrubs and trees. Laurelia sempervirens fruits are consumed as a spice in South America.	Laurales	Atherosperma moschatum
Austrobaileyaceae (Austrobaileya family)	Austrobaileya, for Frederick Manson Bailey (1827–1915) and Irving Widmer Bailey (1884–1967)	1 genus, in northern Queensland, Australia	Woody vines with smooth leathery leaves	Austrobaileyales	Austrobaileya scandens
Cabombaceae (fanwort family)	Cabomba, from a Guianese plant name	2 genera, scattered worldwide, in fresh water only	Floating herbaceous perennials. Brasenia schreberi is grown as a vegetable in China and Japan.	Nymphaeales	Cabomba caroliniana
Calycanthaceae (spicebush family)	Calycanthus, from Greek for "calyx flower" (with similar sepals and petals)	3 genera, in the US, China and Queensland, Australia. Chimonanthus is cultivated in many countries.	Scented trees and shrubs, with buds covered in scales. Calycanthus oil is used in perfumes, and that genus and Chimonanthus are cultivated for their scented flowers.	Laurales	Calycanthus floridus
Canellaceae (canela-bark family)	Canella, from Canna and Latin for "little"	5 genera, in the Americas and eastern and southern Africa	Trees (and some shrubs) with scented leaves. Canella bark is edible, but also used to poison fish.	Canellales	Canella winterana
Ceratophyllaceae (hornwort family)	Ceratophyllum, from Greek for "horned (antler-shaped) leaves"	1 genus, in non-salty waterways worldwide	Submerged rootless plants that can anchor themselves with special branches. Some are used in aquariums to maintain oxygen levels.	Ceratophyllales	Ceratophyllum demersum
Chloranthaceae (pearl-orchid family)	Chloranthus, from Greek for "green flowers"	4 genera, in the tropics, usually on mountain slopes	Scented soft-wooded trees, shrubs and herbaceous plants. Some species of Chloranthus are used in teas.	Chloranthales	Chloranthus japonicus
Degeneriaceae (masiratu family)	Degeneria, for Otto Degener (1899–1988)	1 genus, only in Fiji	Smooth scented trees with spirally arranged leaves	Magnoliales	—
Eupomatiaceae (bolwarra family)	Eupomatia, from Greek for "well-capped"	1 genus, in New Guinea and eastern Australia	Shrubs, and a few trees, with root tubers and scented leaves. Eupomatia laurina fruit is an ingredient in jams, desserts and juices.	Magnoliales	Eupomatia laurina
Gomortegaceae (keule family)	Gomortega, for Casimiro Gómez Ortega (1741–1818)	1 genus, only in the coastal mountains of southern Chile	Just one species of scented evergreen trees. Keule fruit is prized in Chile.	Laurales	Gomortega keule
Hernandiaceae (lantern-tree family)	Hernandia, for Francisco Hernández de Toledo (1514–1587)	4 genera, mostly in tropical lowlands	Shrubs, trees and woody vines. Gyrocarpus is a source of lightweight timber.	Laurales	Hernandia nymphaeifolia
Himantandraceae (pigeonberry-ash family)	Galbulimima. Himantandra, an earlier synonym, is from Greek for "strap-like male parts".	1 genus, in Melanesia and eastern Australia	Scented trees with coppery-haired leaves. The wood is used for timber.	Magnoliales	Galbulimima belgraveana
Hydatellaceae (watertufts family)	Trithuria. Hydatella, an earlier synonym, is from Greek for "little water" (plant).	1 genus, in New Zealand, Australia and India	Tiny, usually aquatic plants with rhizomes	Nymphaeales	Trithuria submersa
Lauraceae (bay-laurel family)	Laurus, from a Latin plant name	56 genera, throughout the tropics, with a few species in temperate zones	Scented shrubs and trees, except for the parasitic genus Cassytha. Avocado is a staple food crop, and many other species have edible parts.	Laurales	Laurus nobilis
Magnoliaceae (tuliptree family)	Magnolia, for Pierre Magnol (1638–1715)	2 genera, scattered in Brazil and in generally eastern and southeastern regions of both Asia and North America	Shrubs and trees with deciduous leaves that enclose the often large flower buds. Many species are popular garden ornamentals, and some of the scented oils are used in perfumes.	Magnoliales	Magnolia virginiana
Monimiaceae (boldo family)	Monimia, for Monime (d. 71 BC), a queen of Pontus	27 genera, scattered in the tropics, with some genera in temperate forests of the Southern Hemisphere	Scented shrubs, trees and woody vines. The leaves and fruits of Peumus boldus (boldo) are edible. Some species produce good timber.	Laurales	A Monimia species
Myristicaceae (nutmeg family)	Myristica, from Greek for an ointment	21 genera, all in the tropics	Scented trees and shrubs with red sap. The spice nutmeg can be addictive and toxic in large doses, but the oil is used medicinally and as a toothpaste additive.	Magnoliales	Myristica fragrans
Nymphaeaceae (waterlily family)	Nymphaea, from Greek for "water nymphs"	5 genera, widespread in shallow tropical and temperate waterways	Aquatic herbaceous plants, often with edible seeds and rhizomes. They are cultivated around the world as pond and aquarium ornamentals and for their nutritional value.	Nymphaeales	Nymphaea alba
Piperaceae (pepper family)	Piper, from a Latin plant name, originally from Sanskrit and Greek	5 genera, widespread in the tropics and subtropics	Shrubs, trees, woody vines and herbaceous plants, many with scented leaves. Some species grow on other plants. Black pepper, now grown around the world, was the first trading commodity of the East Indies in the 16th and 17th centuries.	Piperales	Piper nigrum
Saururaceae (lizard's-tail family)	Saururus, from Greek for "lizard tail"	4 genera, in East and Southeast Asia, and in the US	Scented herbaceous perennials with rhizomes. Houttuynia cordata, a fishy-tasting vegetable, is consumed in China.	Piperales	Saururus cernuus
Schisandraceae (star-anise family)	Schisandra, from Greek for "divided male parts" (the anthers)	3 genera, in eastern Asia, with one species in the southeastern US	Shrubs, small trees and woody vines with scented leaves. Some fruits are made into jams and juices. Fruits of Illicium verum (star anise) are used as a spice and processed pharmaceutically for the antiviral drug Tamiflu.	Austrobaileyales	Schisandra rubriflora
Siparunaceae (fevertree family)	Siparuna, from a Guianese plant name	2 genera, in the tropics of West Africa and the Americas	Small trees, shrubs and a few woody vines	Laurales	Siparuna guianensis
Trimeniaceae (bittervine family)	Trimenia, for Henry Trimen (1843–1896)	1 genus, in eastern Australia, Sulawesi, Melanesia and Polynesia	Shrubs, trees and woody vines	Austrobaileyales	Trimenia weinmanniifolia
Winteraceae (Winter's-bark family)	Wintera, for John Winter (16th century), a ship captain	5 genera, scattered in the Americas, Madagascar, and in and around the southwestern Pacific	Scented trees and shrubs with a few woody vines, some growing on other plants. Tasmannia species are grown as pepper substitutes. Drimys winteri was an effective scurvy remedy in the 17th and 18th centuries.	Canellales	Drimys winteri

== See also ==
- List of plant family names with etymologies
