= G. baccata =

G. baccata may refer to:

- Galbulimima baccata, a paleodicot species in the genus Galbulimima
- Gaylussacia baccata, a huckleberry species
- Gibberella baccata, a fungal plant pathogen species

== See also ==
- Baccata
