= Hedyosmum purpurascens =

Conservation status
- Vulnerable (IUCN 3.1)

Scientific classification
- Kingdom: Plantae
- Clade: Tracheophytes
- Clade: Angiosperms
- Order: Chloranthales
- Family: Chloranthaceae
- Genus: Hedyosmum
- Species: H. purpurascens

Binomial name
- Hedyosmum purpurascens Todzia

Species of flowering plant

Hedyosmum purpurascens is a species of plant in the Chloranthaceae family. It is endemic to Ecuador. Its natural habitat is subtropical or tropical moist montane forests.
