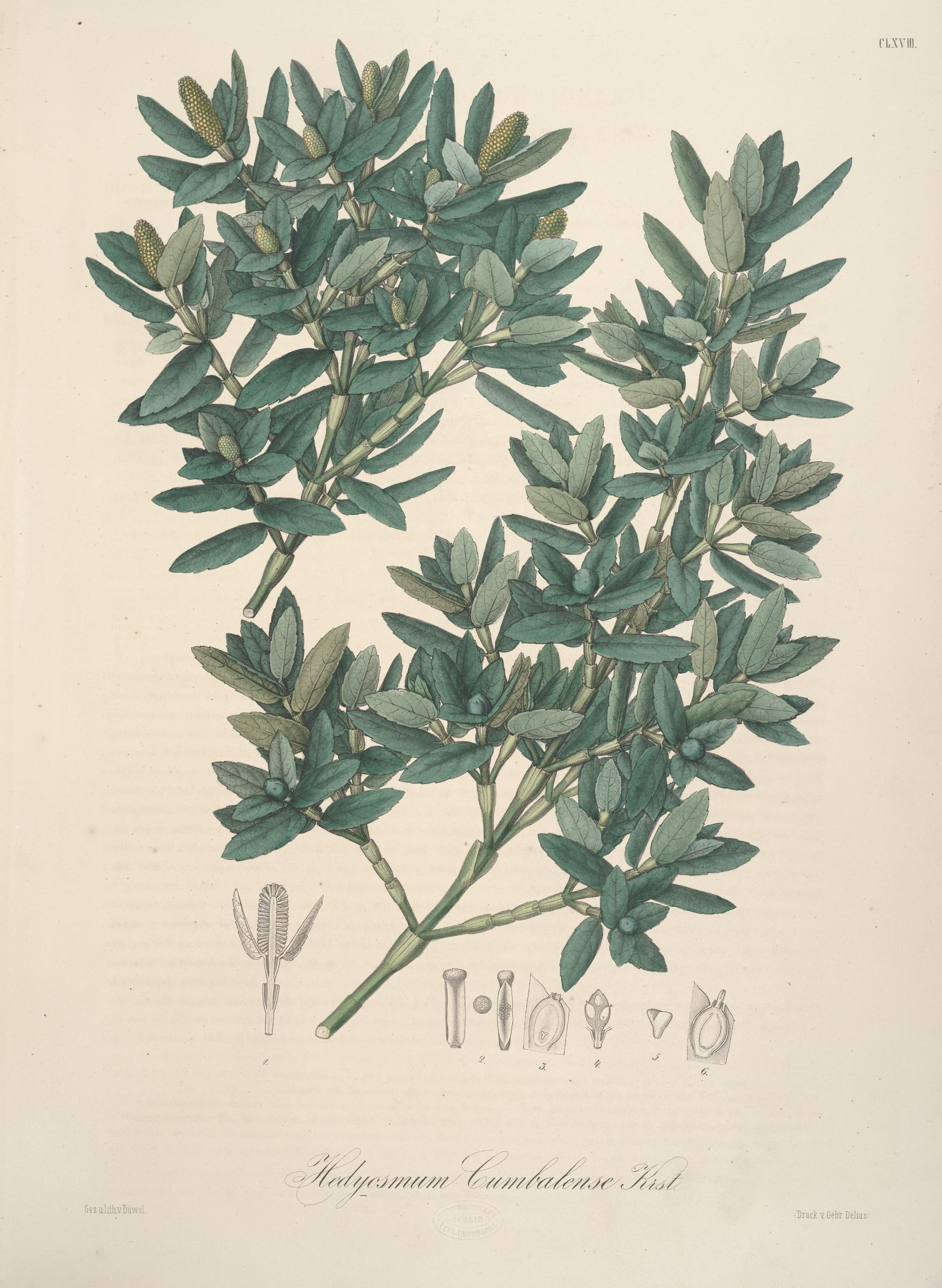

Conservation status
- Least Concern (IUCN 3.1)=

Scientific classification
- Kingdom: Plantae
- Clade: Tracheophytes
- Clade: Angiosperms
- Order: Chloranthales
- Family: Chloranthaceae
- Genus: Hedyosmum
- Species: H. cumbalense

Binomial name
- Hedyosmum cumbalense H.Karst.

Synonyms
- Tafalla cumbalensis (H.Karst.) Kuntze; Hedyosmum granizo Cuatrec.; Hedyosmum toxicum Cuatrec.

= Hedyosmum cumbalense =

Species of tree

Hedyosmum cumbalense is a species of tree in the family Chloranthaceae. It is native to South America.
