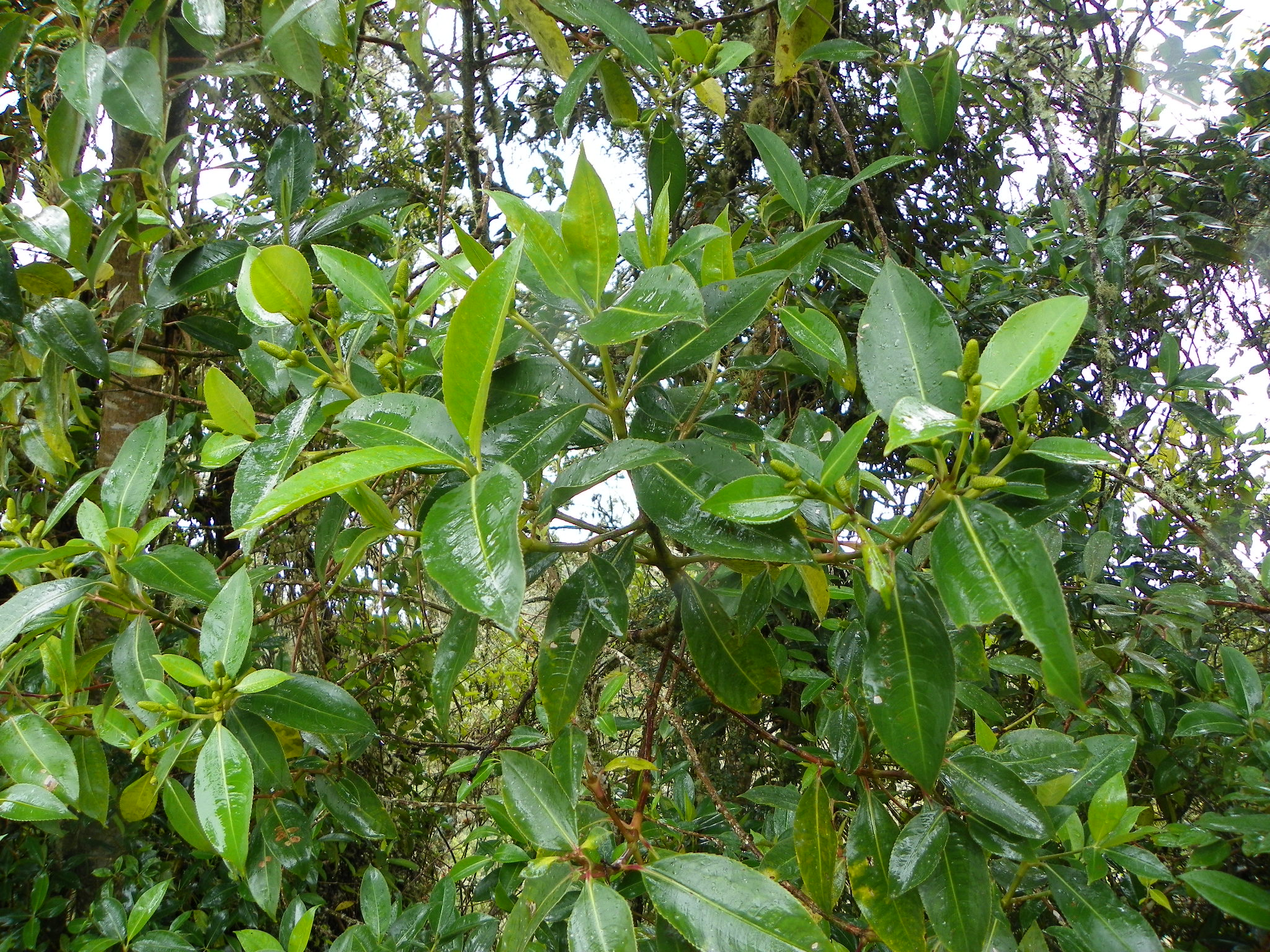

Conservation status
- Least Concern (IUCN 3.1)

Scientific classification
- Kingdom: Plantae
- Clade: Tracheophytes
- Clade: Angiosperms
- Order: Chloranthales
- Family: Chloranthaceae
- Genus: Hedyosmum
- Species: H. racemosum

Binomial name
- Hedyosmum racemosum (Ruiz & Pav.) G.Don

Synonyms
- Tafalla racemosa Ruiz & Pav.; Hedyosmum bolivianum Cordem. ex Baill.; Hedyosmum glabratum Kunth; Hedyosmum glaucum (Ruiz & Pav.) Cordem. ex Baill.; Hedyosmum huilense Cuatrec.; Hedyosmum integrum Cordem. ex Baill.; Hedyosmum llanorum Cuatrec.; Tafalla glabrata (Kunth) Rusby; Tafalla glauca Ruiz & Pav.; Tafalla integra (Cordem. ex Baill.) Kuntze

= Hedyosmum racemosum =

Species of tree

Hedyosmum racemosum is a species of tree in the family Chloranthaceae. It is native to South America.
