= Trimenia =

Trimenia may refer to:

- Trimenia (butterfly), a genus of butterfly in the family Lycaenidae
- Trimenia (plant), a genus of plants in the family Trimeniaceae
