= Leioproctus euscopatus =

Scientific classification
- Kingdom: Animalia
- Phylum: Arthropoda
- Clade: Pancrustacea
- Class: Insecta
- Order: Hymenoptera
- Family: Colletidae
- Genus: Leioproctus
- Species: L. euscopatus

Binomial name
- Leioproctus euscopatus Batley, 2025

Species of bee

Leioproctus euscopatus, or Leioproctus (Euryglossidia) euscopatus, is a species of bee in the family Colletidae and subfamily Colletinae. It is endemic to Australia. It was described by entomologist Michael Batley in 2025.

== Etymology ==
The specific epithet euscopatus is an anatomical reference to the relatively dense hind tibial scopa of the female.

== Description ==
The female body length is about 7.5 mm, male body length 7 mm. Integumental colouration is mainly black with the metasoma red-brown. The hair is white and brown.

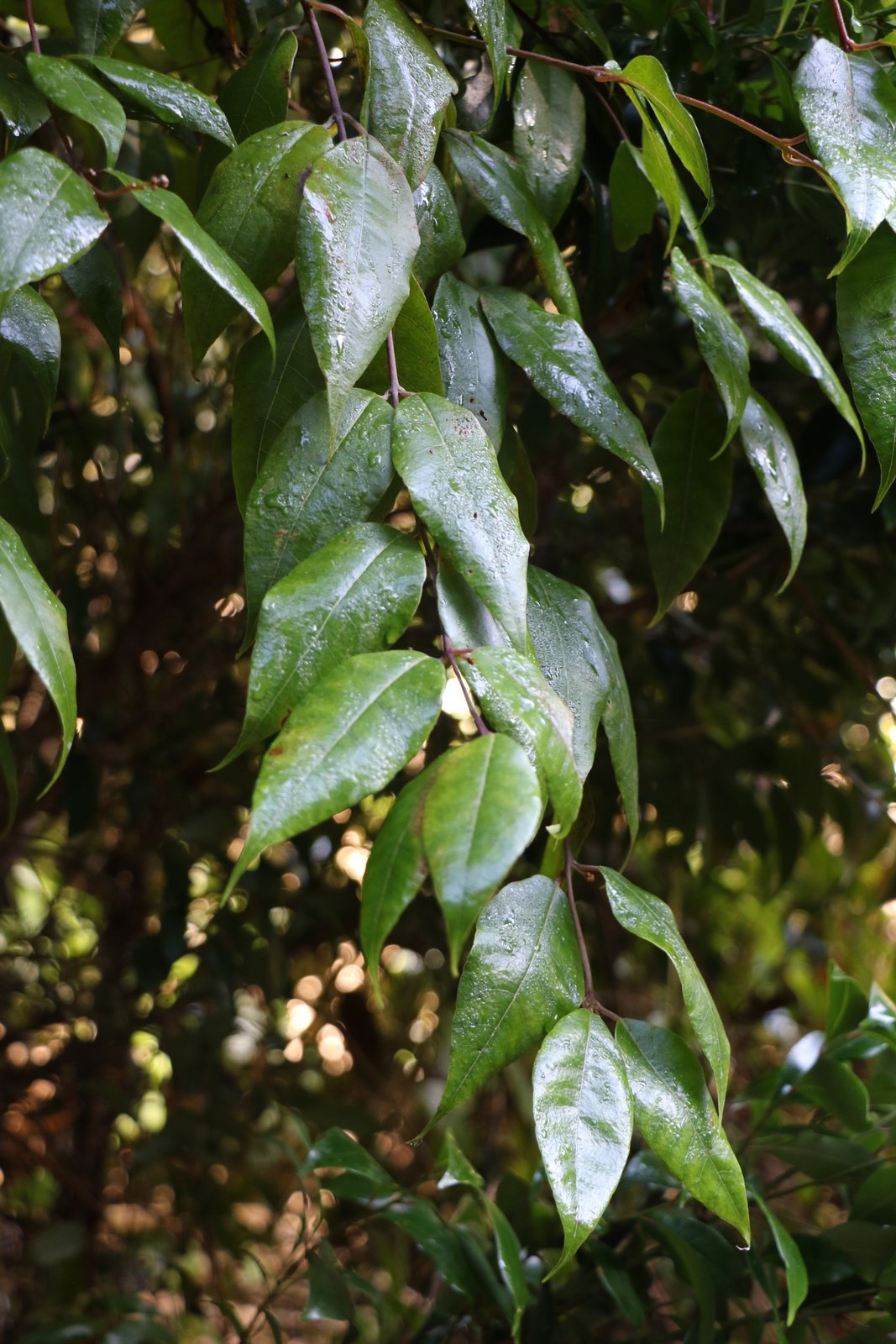
Trimenia moorei (bitter vine), a forage plant of the bees

== Distribution and habitat ==
The species occurs in New South Wales. The type locality is the Mullion Range State Conservation Area, near Orange in the Central Tablelands.

== Behaviour ==
The adults are flying mellivores. Flowering plants visited by the bees include Leucopogon microphyllus and Trimenia moorei.

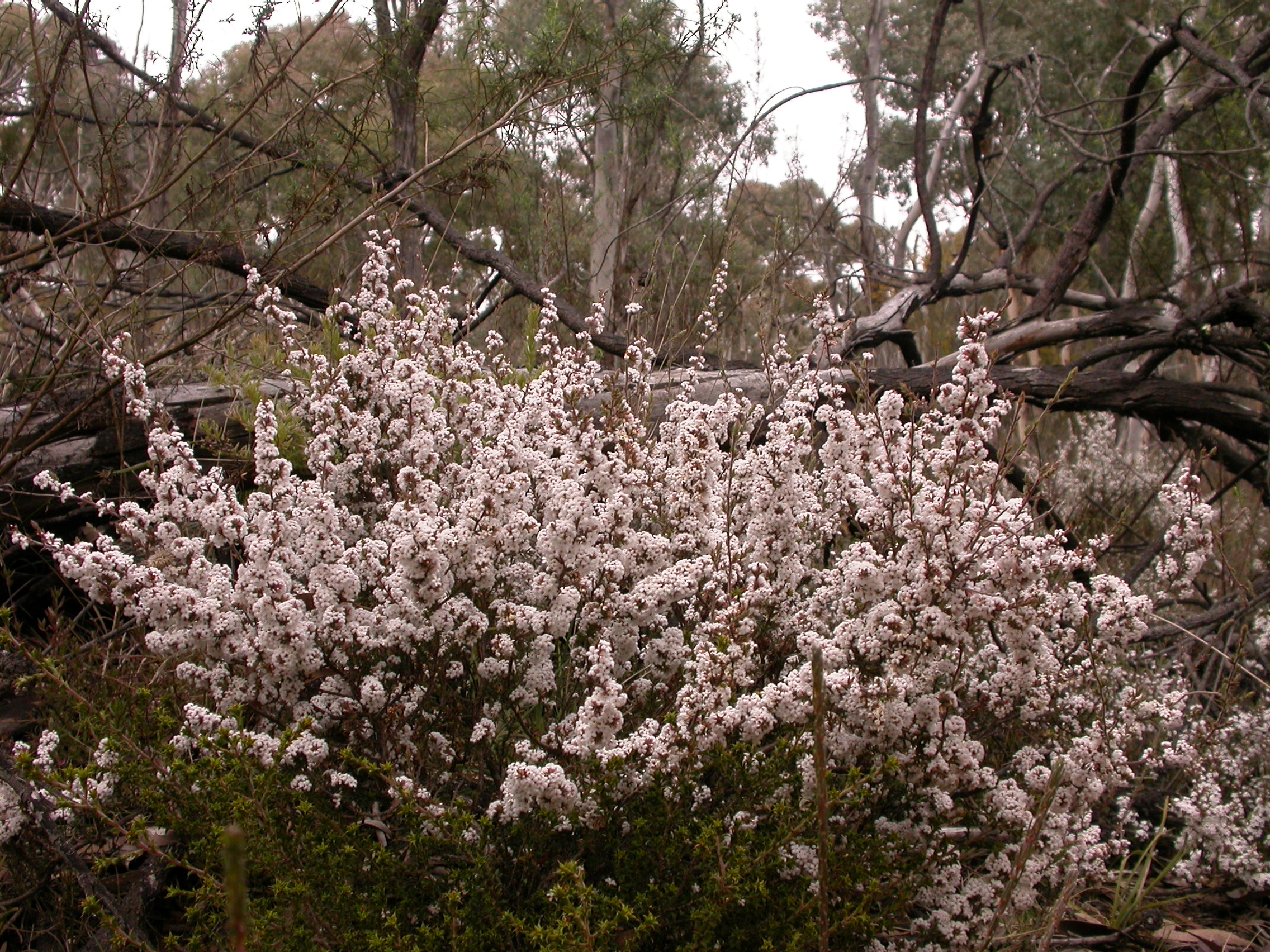
Leucopogon microphyllus, a forage plant of the bees
