= Hedyosmum correanum =

Conservation status
- Least Concern (IUCN 3.1)

Scientific classification
- Kingdom: Plantae
- Clade: Tracheophytes
- Clade: Angiosperms
- Order: Chloranthales
- Family: Chloranthaceae
- Genus: Hedyosmum
- Species: H. correanum

Binomial name
- Hedyosmum correanum D'Arcy & Liesner

Species of flowering plant

Hedyosmum correanum is a species of flowering plant in the Chloranthaceae family. It is a shrub or small tree endemic to western Panama. It is native to montane rain forest from 1,400 to 2,936 metres elevation, ranging from La Amistad National Park near the Costa Rica border to Cerro Santiago. It is threatened by habitat loss.

== Background ==
According to Vol 6. of Systematic Botany by W. G. D'Arcy and Ronald L. Liesner Hedyosmum correanum does not have a large amount of research readily available as many popular plants or flowers might. At least as far as the taxonomy of the Hedyosmum in general is concerned.

== Key known facts ==
However, there are still certain pieces of information available as they are similar to H.burgerianum in terms of size according to D'Arcy and Liesner.

It is a member of the Hedyosmum callooso-serratum group as the fused involucre represents.

Hedyosmum occurs in the West Indies, Central America and South America.

== Name origin ==
While the name is clearly associated with Genus Hedyosmum it is obvious the correanum was given in reference to a professor of University of Panama, Prof. Mireya D. Correa A.
