= Hedyosmum nutans =

Scientific classification
- Kingdom: Plantae
- Clade: Tracheophytes
- Clade: Angiosperms
- Order: Chloranthales
- Family: Chloranthaceae
- Genus: Hedyosmum
- Species: H. nutans

Binomial name
- Hedyosmum nutans Sw.

Synonyms
- Tafalla nutans (Kuntze)

Species of flowering plant

Hedyosmum nutans is a plant that was described by Olof Swartz. It is part of the genus Hedyosmum of the family Chloranthaceae. No subspecies are listed in the Catalogue of Life. It is native to Cuba, the Dominican Republic, Haiti, and Jamaica.

== Description ==
H. nutans flowers are yellow-green. The staminate flowers are catkins and each stamen has 4 microsporangia. The carpellate flowers are panicles with one pistil.

The stem is semi-succulent.
