= Hedyosmum burgerianum =

Conservation status
- Data Deficient (IUCN 3.1)

Scientific classification
- Kingdom: Plantae
- Clade: Tracheophytes
- Clade: Angiosperms
- Order: Chloranthales
- Family: Chloranthaceae
- Genus: Hedyosmum
- Species: H. burgerianum

Binomial name
- Hedyosmum burgerianum D'Arcy & Liesner

Species of flowering plant

Hedyosmum burgerianum is a species of plant in the Chloranthaceae family. It is endemic to Panama. It is threatened by habitat loss. It grows in montane rain forest in a narrow elevational range between 1,700 and 2,000 m. The populations are large in certain places. The species of plant is named after William Carl Burger, who has made valuable contributions to the study of this genus.

It is a flowering plant and belongs to the genus Hedyosmum. The tree can grow up to 10 m tall, that are dry dark with slender twigs. Leaves that are oval shaped and are 3-4 cm long and 1-2 cm wide with ascending notch with 3-4 teeth on each on each side. The costa is above, slightly elevated beneath, leaf costa is mostly smooth beneath. The lateral veins are 6 on each side, drying discolors with a slaty dark brown and a reddish brown beneath. Petioles approximately 1 cm long and narrowly winged; the tubes becoming about 2 mm wide at the mouth and 4 mm long. The female inflorescences terminal has 1-3 arising from within the leaf sheaths; peduncles to 2 cm, slender, the flowers on dichasia, the terminal flower about 2 mm long, Flowers with the style linear and 3- angled basally, elaborated distally, 2 mm long. Fruits usually with 3 unobtrusive pores.
