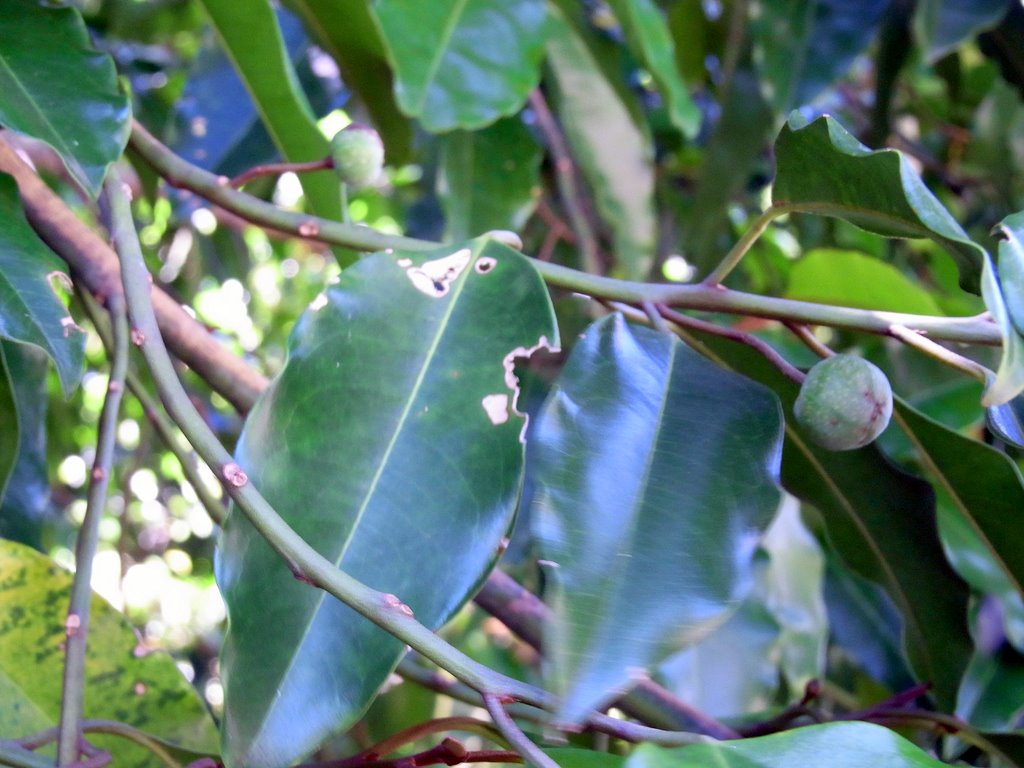

Scientific classification
- Kingdom: Plantae
- Clade: Tracheophytes
- Clade: Angiosperms
- Clade: Magnoliids
- Order: Magnoliales
- Family: Himantandraceae
- Genus: Galbulimima
- Species: G. baccata

Binomial name
- Galbulimima baccata F.M.Bailey

Synonyms
- Himantandra baccata (Bailey) Diels, Botanische Jahrbucher 55: 128(1918); Galbulimima belgraveana (F.Muell.) Sprague, The Journal of Botany 60: 138(1922)

= Galbulimima baccata =

Northern pigeonberry ash

Species of tree

Galbulimima baccata, the northern pigeonberry ash is a rare rainforest tree found in two populations in Queensland, Australia. It is likely to be a poisonous and hallucinogenic plant like the related Galbulimima belgraveana. The fruit is eaten by cassowaries and rainforest pigeons.

Scripps Research Institute finds a novel method of synthesizing Galbulimima sp.(G. belgraveana) compounds for psychotropic applications.
