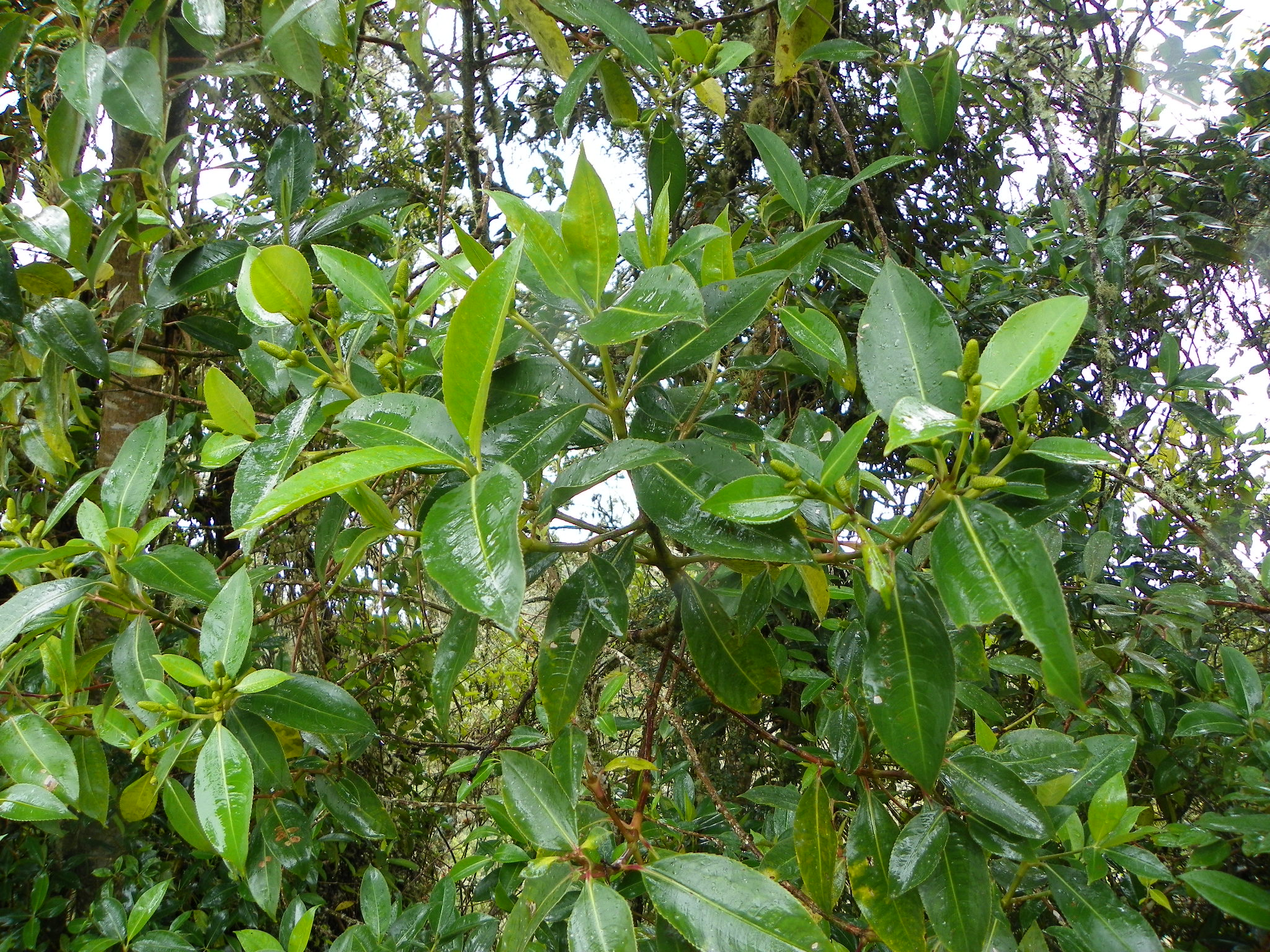
- Hedyosmum racemosum

Scientific classification
- Kingdom: Plantae
- Clade: Tracheophytes
- Clade: Angiosperms
- Order: Chloranthales
- Family: Chloranthaceae
- Genus: Hedyosmum; Sw. (1788)

Synonyms
- Tafalla Ruiz & Pav. (1794); Tafallaea Kuntze (1891), orth. var.; Tavalla Pers. (1807), orth. var.

= Hedyosmum =

Genus of flowering plants

Hedyosmum is a genus of rhizomal flowering plants in the family Chloranthaceae. There are about 40 to 45 species. They are distributed in Central and South America and the West Indies, and one species also occurs in southeastern Asia. They are mostly dioecious, except for H. nutans and H. brenesii which are exclusively monoecious, and H. scaberrimum and H. costaricense with both monoecious and dioecious individuals.

== Species ==
There are 45 accepted species:

- Hedyosmum angustifolium (Ruiz & Pav.) Solms – southwestern Colombia, Peru, Ecuador, and Bolivia
- Hedyosmum anisodorum Todzia – Ecuador and Peru
- Hedyosmum arborescens Sw. – Jamaica, Puerto Rico, Leeward Islands, and Windward Islands
- Hedyosmum bonplandianum Kunth – Honduras to Colombia and Ecuador
- Hedyosmum brasiliense Mart. – Venezuela, Brazil, and Paraguay
- Hedyosmum brenesii Standl. – Central America
- Hedyosmum burgerianum D'Arcy & Liesner – Panama
- Hedyosmum colombianum Cuatrec. – Colombia
- Hedyosmum correanum D'Arcy & Liesner – Panama
- Hedyosmum costaricense C.E.Wood ex W.C.Burger – Costa Rica and Panama
- Hedyosmum crenatum Occhioni – Colombia and Venezuela
- Hedyosmum cuatrecazanum Occhioni – Colombia, Ecuador, Peru, and Bolivia
- Hedyosmum cumbalense H.Karst. – Colombia, Ecuador, and Peru
- Hedyosmum dombeyanum Solms – Peru and Bolivia
- Hedyosmum domingense Urb. – Hispaniola
- Hedyosmum gentryi D'Arcy & Liesner – Panama, Colombia, and Venezuela
- Hedyosmum goudotianum Solms – Nicaragua to Venezuela and Peru
- Hedyosmum huascari J.F.Macbr. – Peru
- Hedyosmum intermedium Todzia – southern Venezuela
- Hedyosmum lechleri Solms – Peru and western Bolivia
- Hedyosmum luteynii Todzia – Colombia and Ecuador
- Hedyosmum maximum (Kuntze) K.Schum. – Bolivia
- Hedyosmum mexicanum C.Cordem. – Mexico to northwestern Colombia
- Hedyosmum narinoense Todzia – Colombia and Ecuador
- Hedyosmum neblinae Todzia – Venezuela and northern Brazil
- Hedyosmum nutans Sw. – Cuba, Hispaniola, and Jamaica
- Hedyosmum orientale Merr. & Chun – Southern China, Vietnam, Borneo, Sulawesi, and Sumatra
- Hedyosmum parvifolium Cordem. ex Baill. – Colombia and northwestern Venezuela
- Hedyosmum peruvianum Todzia – Peru
- Hedyosmum pseudoandromeda Solms – Venezuela
- Hedyosmum pungens Solms – Colombia
- Hedyosmum purpurascens Todzia – Ecuador
- Hedyosmum racemosum (Ruiz & Pav.) G.Don – northern South America
- Hedyosmum scaberrimum Standl. – Nicaragua to Colombia and Ecuador
- Hedyosmum scabrum (Ruiz & Pav.) Solms – southern Colombia, Ecuador, Peru, and Bolivia
- Hedyosmum spectabile Todzia – Ecuador and Peru
- Hedyosmum sprucei Solms – southern Colombia, Ecuador, and Peru
- Hedyosmum steinii Todzia – Colombia
- Hedyosmum strigosum Todzia – Colombia
- Hedyosmum subintegrum Urb. – Cuba
- Hedyosmum tepuiense Todzia – southern Venezuela and western Guyana
- Hedyosmum translucidum Cuatrec. – Peru, Ecuador, Colombia, and northwestern Venezuela
- Hedyosmum uniflorum Todzia – Ecuador
