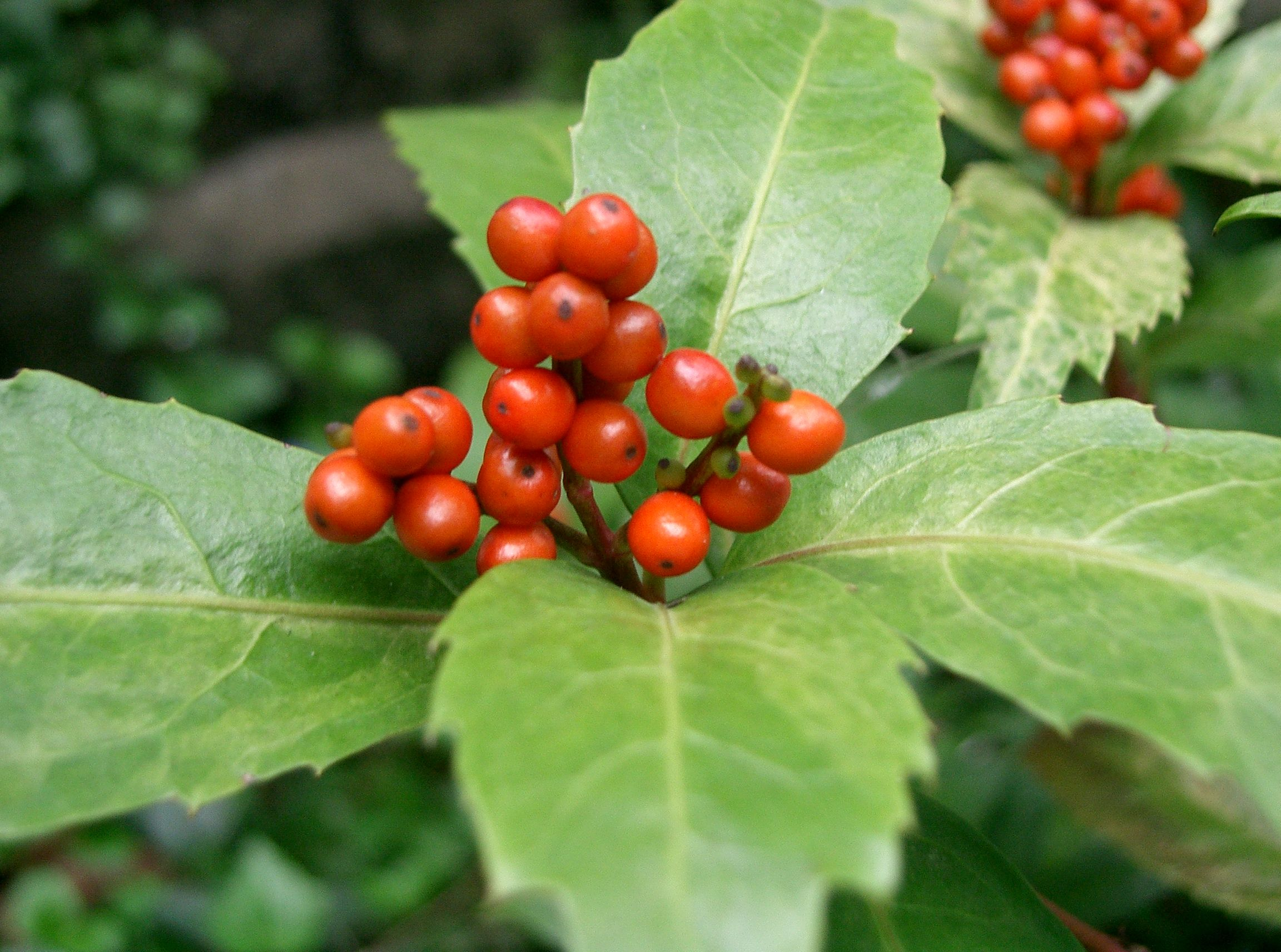
- Sarcandra glabra

Scientific classification
- Kingdom: Plantae
- Clade: Tracheophytes
- Clade: Angiosperms
- Order: Chloranthales
- Family: Chloranthaceae
- Genus: Sarcandra; Gardner

= Sarcandra =

Genus of plants

Sarcandra is a genus of the family Chloranthaceae, containing three species native to Asia.

== Species ==
- Sarcandra glabra (Thunb.) Nakai
- Sarcandra grandifolia (Miq.) Subr. & A.N.Henry
- Sarcandra irvingbaileyi Swamy
