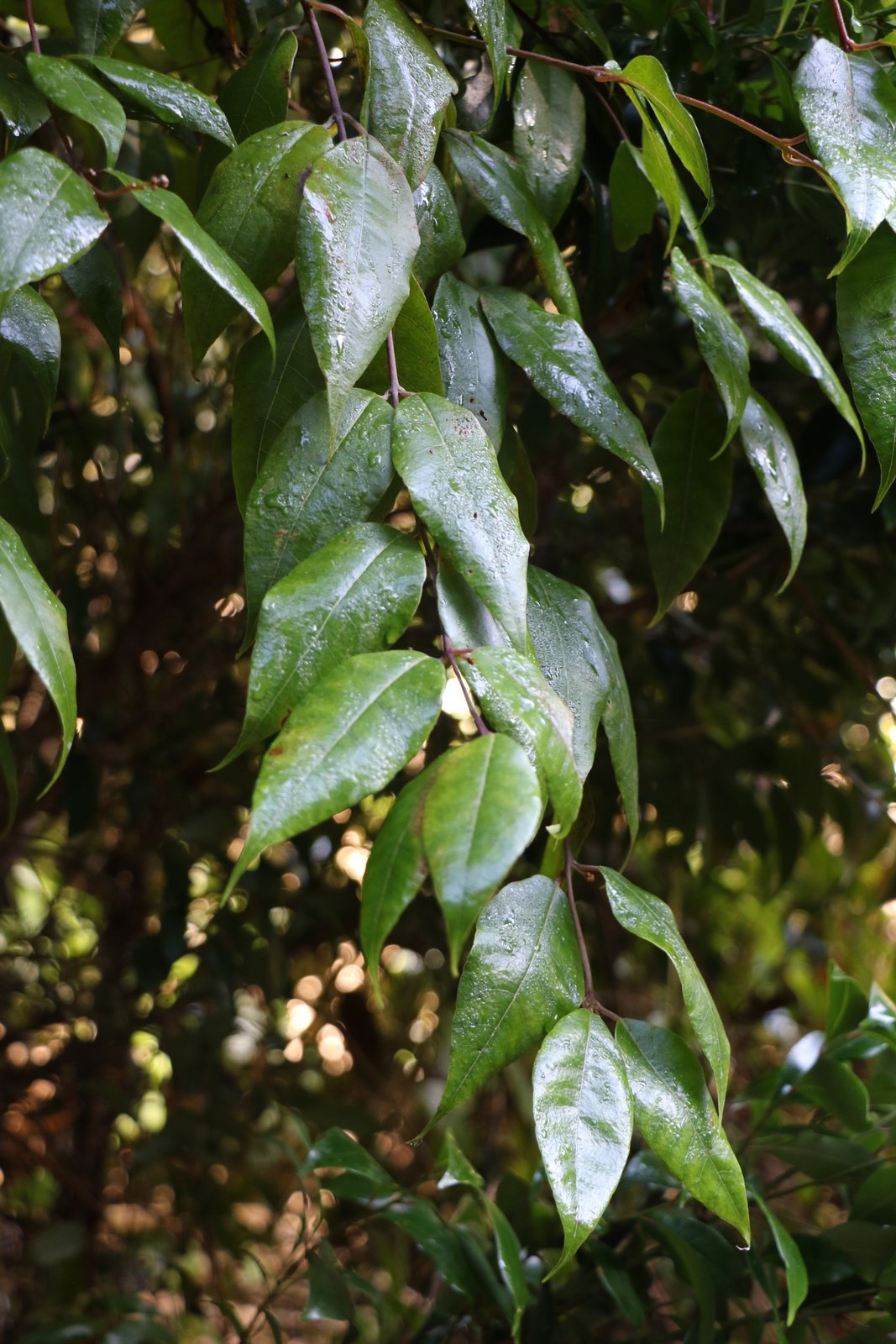
- Coorabakh National Park

Scientific classification
- Kingdom: Plantae
- Clade: Tracheophytes
- Clade: Angiosperms
- Order: Austrobaileyales
- Family: Trimeniaceae
- Genus: Trimenia
- Species: T. moorei

Binomial name
- Trimenia moorei (Oliv. ex Benth.) Philipson

Synonyms
- Piptocalyx moorei

= Trimenia moorei =

Bitter Vine

Species of climbing plant

Trimenia moorei, the bitter vine, is a climbing plant found in eastern Australia.
