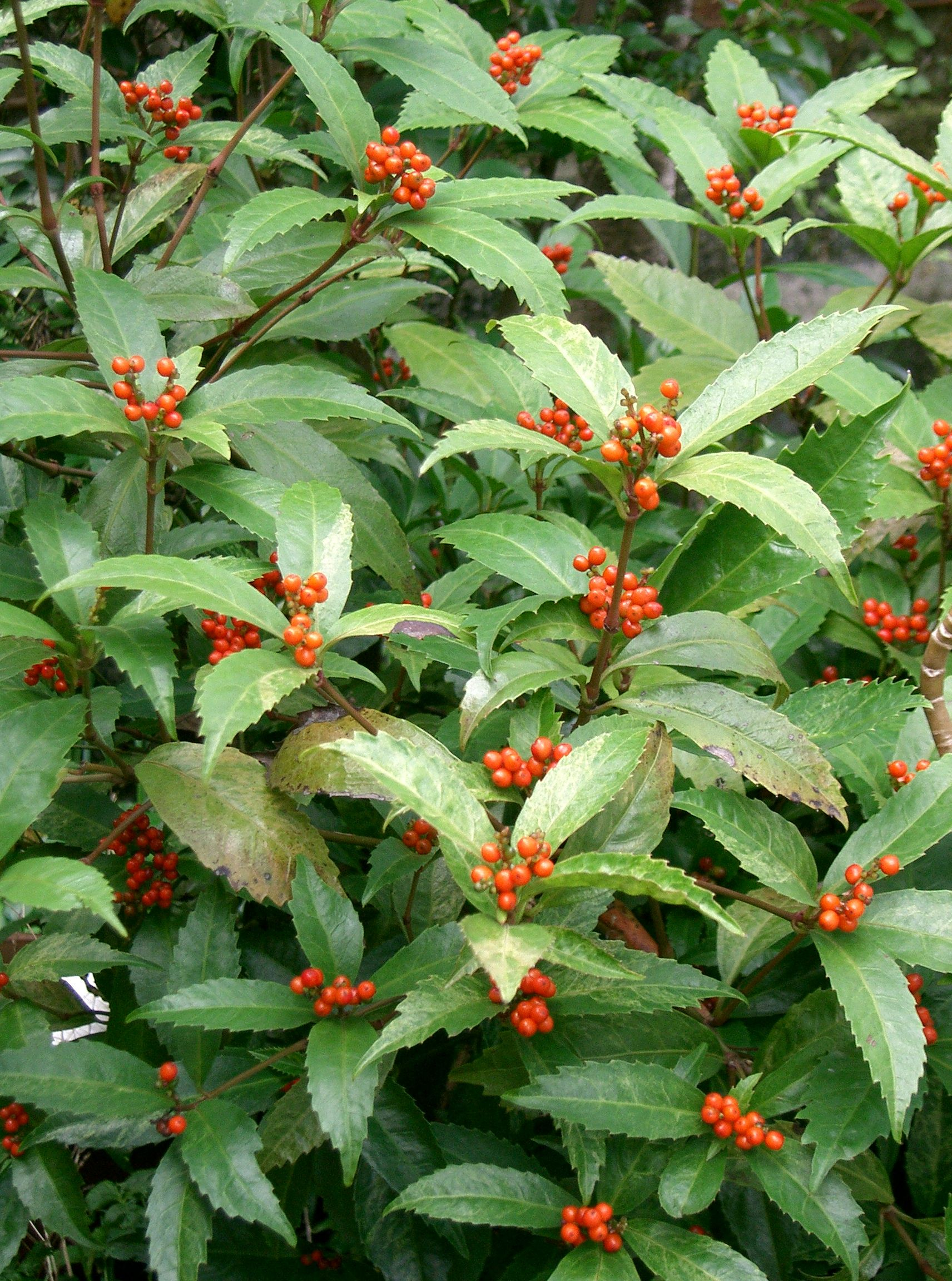
- Sarcandra glabra

Scientific classification
- Kingdom: Plantae
- Clade: Tracheophytes
- Clade: Angiosperms
- Order: Chloranthales
- Family: Chloranthaceae
- Genus: Sarcandra
- Species: S. glabra

Binomial name
- Sarcandra glabra (Thunb.) Nakai

Synonyms
- List: Ascarina serrata Blume; Chloranthus brachystachys Blume; Chloranthus ceylanicus Miq.; Chloranthus denticulatus Cordem.; Chloranthus esquirolii H.Lév.; Chloranthus glaber (Thunb.) Makino; Chloranthus hainanensis C.Pei; Chloranthus monander R.Br.; Chloranthus montanus Siebold ex Miq.; Sarcandra hainanensis (C.Pei) Swamy & I.W.Bailey

= Sarcandra glabra =

Species of herb

Sarcandra glabra is a herb native to Southeast Asia. It is also known as herba sarcandrae or glabrous sarcandra herb. Other common names include the nine-knotted flower and the bone-knitted lotus.

Aromatic oils may be extracted from the leaves. This extract has been shown in mice to reduce immunologic attenuation due to stress.

== Morphology ==
Leaf blade elliptic or ovate-lanceolate, 6–17 × 2–6 cm, leathery, margin sharply coarsely-serrate. Stamen baculate to terete; thecae shorter than connective. Stigma subcapitate. Fruit globose or ovoid, 3–4 mm in diam.

== Distribution ==
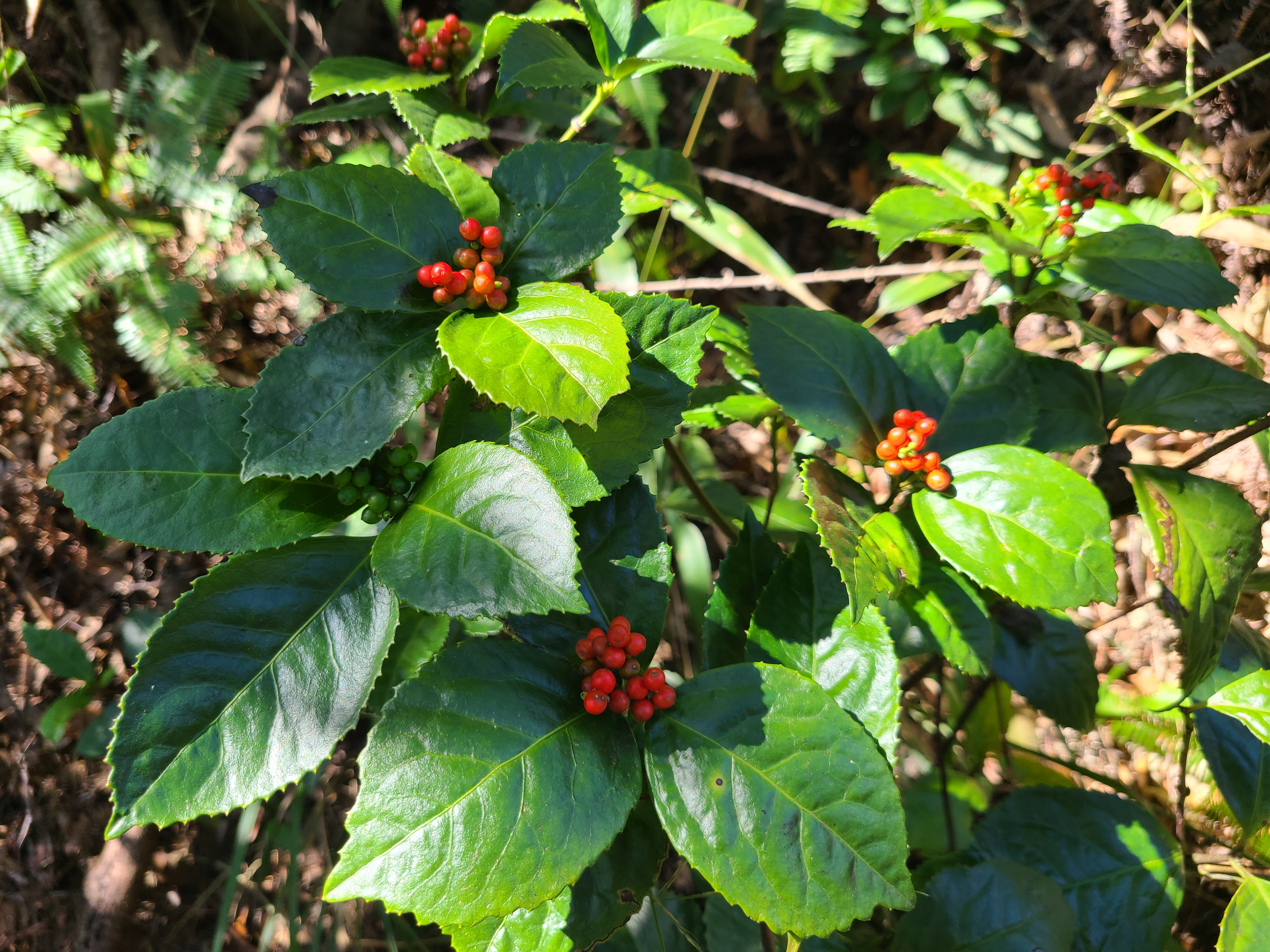
Sarcandra glabra in Kowloon Peak

The plant is distributed in Vietnam, Sri Lanka, Taiwan, Cambodia, Malaysia, India, Japan, Korea, the Philippines, and in China (Jiangxi, Anhui, Fujian, Guizhou, Guangxi, Hong Kong, Hunan, Sichuan, Yunnan, Guangdong, Zhejiang and other places), growing at an altitude of 420 meters to 1,500 meters, often growing on wet slopes and in shaded valleys.

== Use in Japanese culture ==
The plant is used during Japanese New Year for chabana decoration, normally along winter jasmine. Others plants used instead of Sarcandra glabra because of its similarity to it are coralberry trees and Ardisia japonica.
