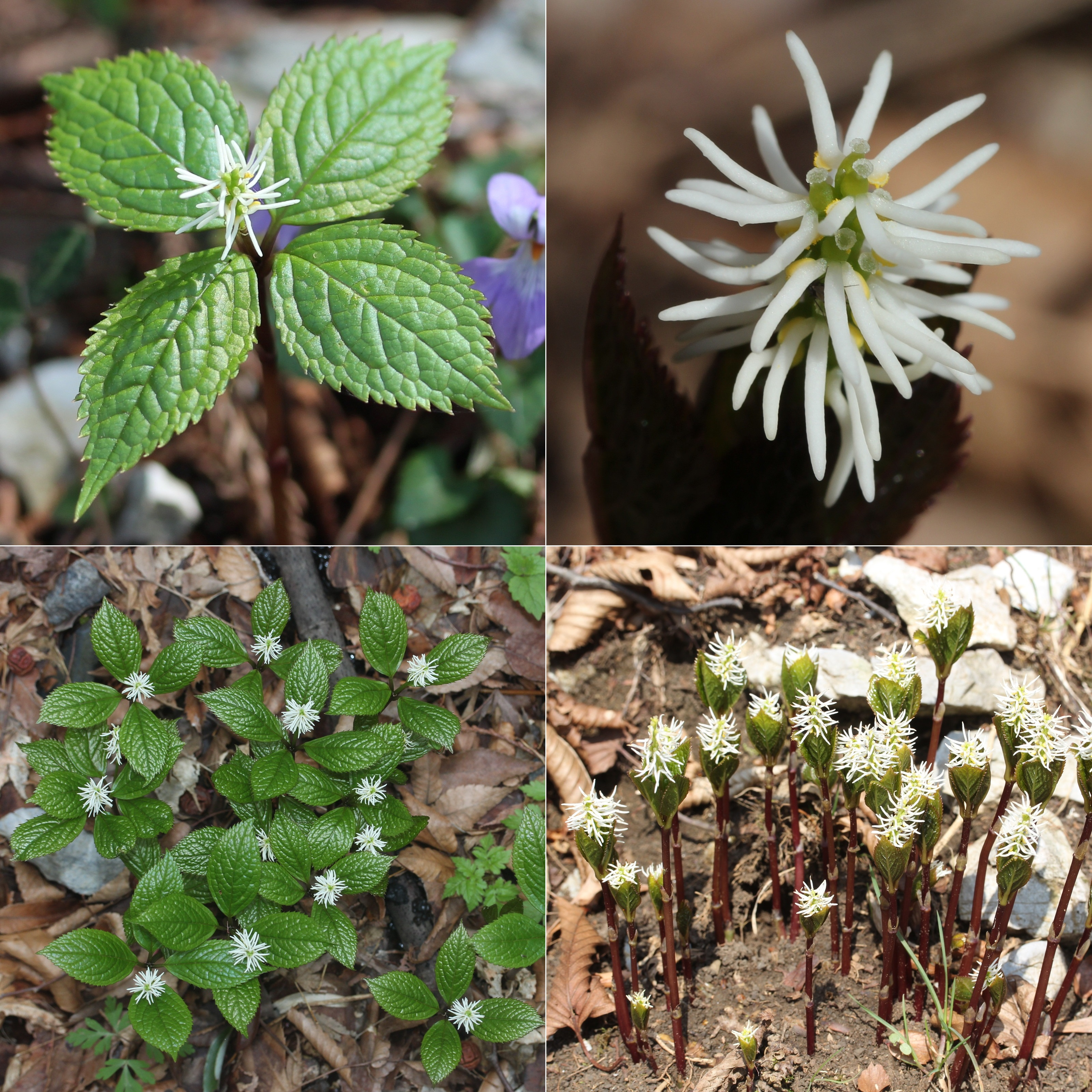
- In Japan

Scientific classification
- Kingdom: Plantae
- Clade: Tracheophytes
- Clade: Angiosperms
- Order: Chloranthales
- Family: Chloranthaceae
- Genus: Chloranthus
- Species: C. japonicus

Binomial name
- Chloranthus japonicus Siebold

Synonyms
- Chloranthus mandshuricus Rupr.; Tricercandra japonica (Siebold) Nakai

= Chloranthus japonicus =

Species of flowering plant

Chloranthus japonicus is a perennial herb in the Chloranthaceae family.

== Distribution ==
Chloranthus japonicus is found in North Korea, Russia, islands of Japan such as Hokkaido, Honshu, Shikoku, and Kyushu, as well as provinces of Mainland China such as Gansu, Jilin, Shanxi, Shandong, Shaanxi, Hebei, and Liaoning, at altitudes from 500–2,300 m (1,600–7,500 ft) above sea level. The plant grows in mixed shaded and damp areas, such as hillsides and groves near standing water.

== Description ==
Chloranthus japonicus has four serrated leaves at orthogonal directions, and a thick rhizome used for medicinal purposes. C. japonicus has an aromatic stem, with diameter from 0.1–1.5 mm and a height from 20–50 mm. The stem is thin like an arrow shaft. The leaves are umbrella-shaped and grow at the end of the branches. The flowers are light yellow and grow in the center of the four leaves. The roots grow horizontally without root hairs and are best harvested in February and August.

== Chemical properties ==
All parts of the plant, especially the stem, are hemotoxic and reprotoxic to mice, and has organic chemicals such as various chloranthalactones, various atractylenolides, shizukanolide, shizukolidol, shizukafuranol, shizukaol, furanodienone, and scopoletin. Chloranthalactone C is known to have antifungal effects against Mucor circinelloides. The plant is known to act as a choleretic, weaker than an equivalent dose of dehydrocholic acid.
