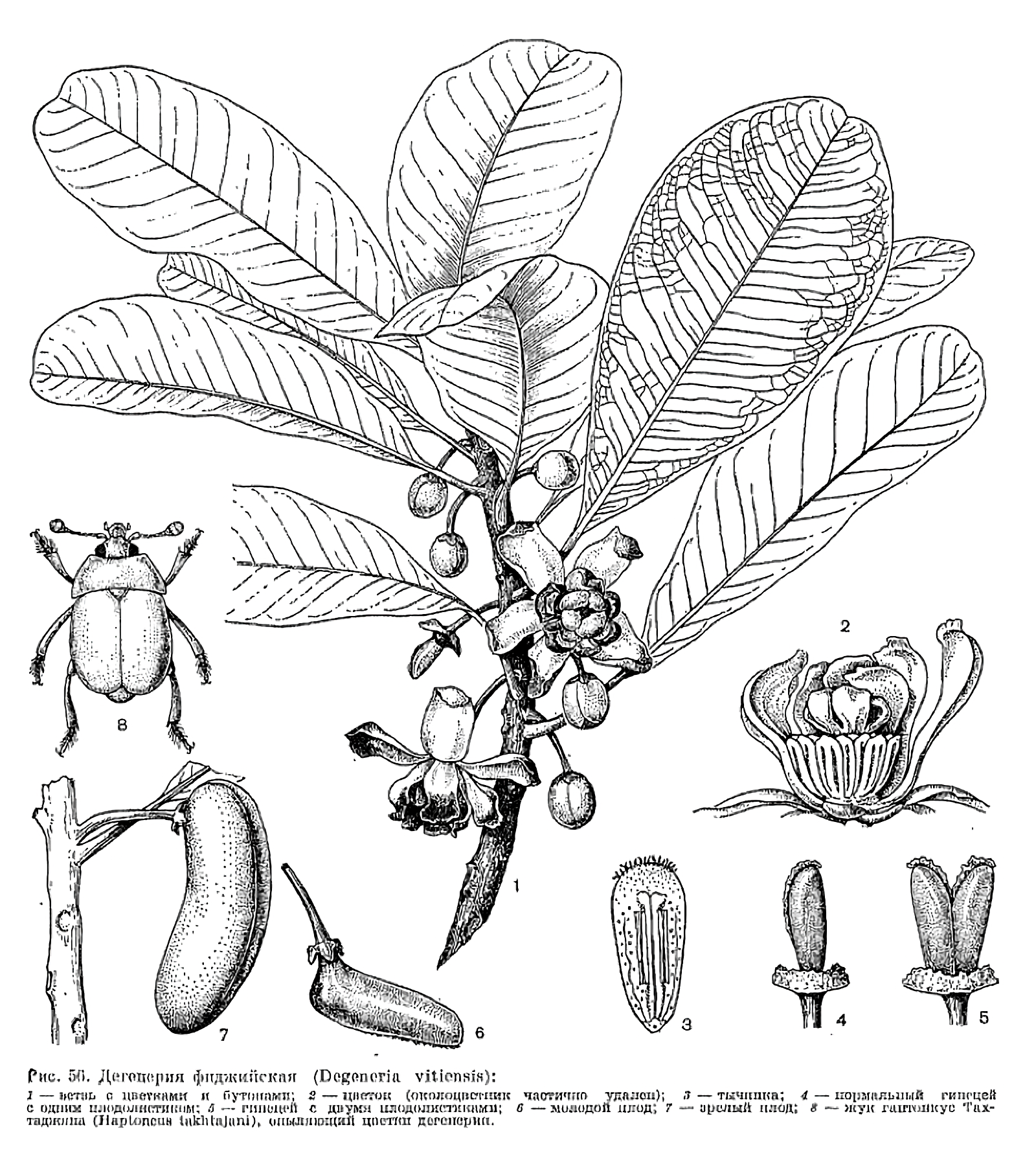

Conservation status
- Least Concern (IUCN 3.1)

Scientific classification
- Kingdom: Plantae
- Clade: Tracheophytes
- Clade: Angiosperms
- Clade: Magnoliids
- Order: Magnoliales
- Family: Degeneriaceae
- Genus: Degeneria
- Species: D. vitiensis

Binomial name
- Degeneria vitiensis L.W.Bailey & A.C.Sm.

= Degeneria vitiensis =

Species of tree

Degeneria vitiensis is a flowering tree found on Viti Levu in Fiji. It is known as masiratu and vāvāloa in Fijian, although the latter is also used for Litsea magnifolia. It is a relatively common plant and is used as timber. It has been found in upland forests on steep slopes.

The pollen-eating beetle Haptoncus takhtajani is associated with the plant. The systematics and taxonomy of Degeneriaceae were reviewed in 1991.
