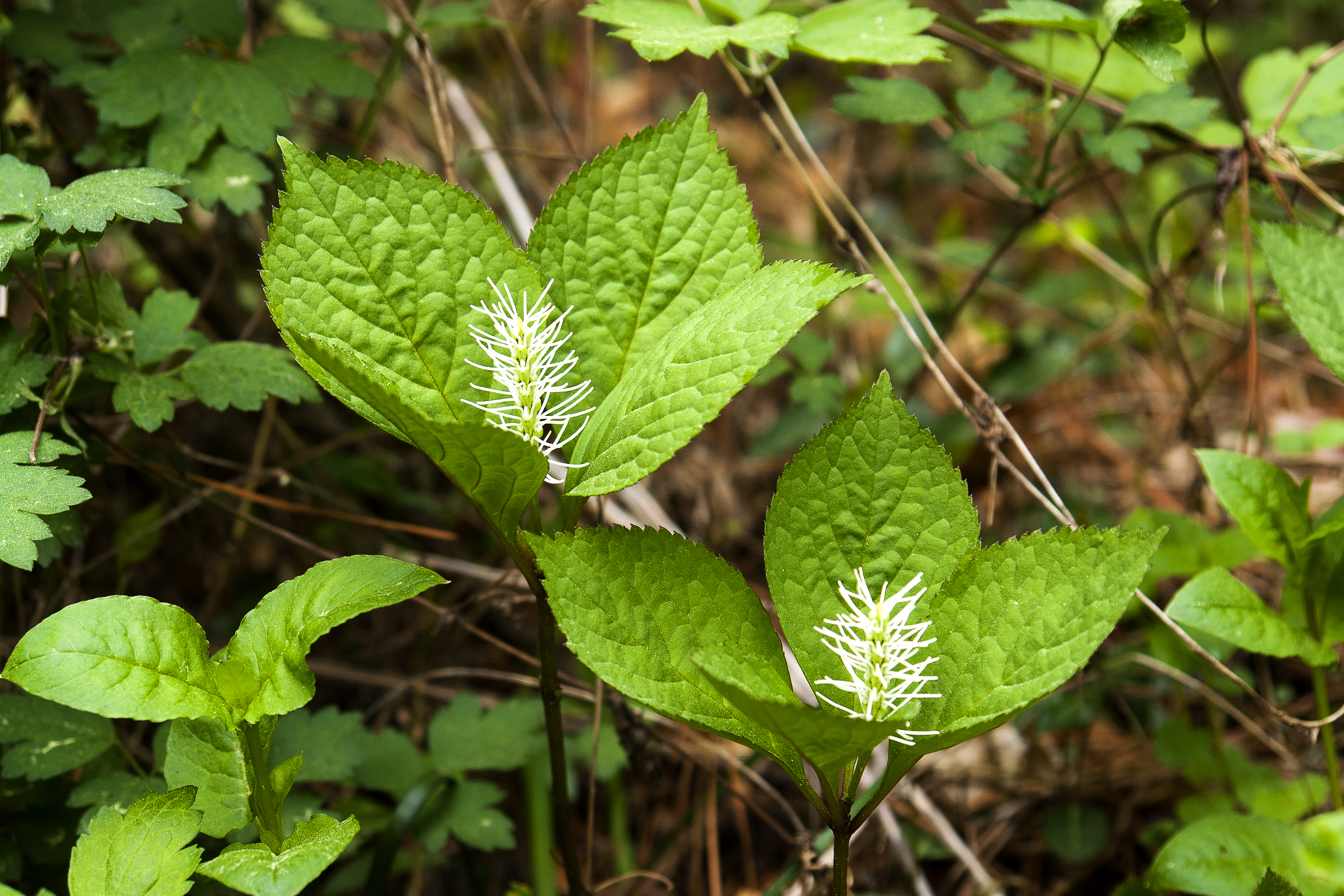
- Chloranthus fortunei

Scientific classification
- Kingdom: Plantae
- Clade: Tracheophytes
- Clade: Angiosperms
- Order: Chloranthales
- Family: Chloranthaceae
- Genus: Chloranthus; Sw.

Species
- See text

= Chloranthus =

Genus of flowering plants

Chloranthus is a genus of flowering plants in the family Chloranthaceae.

It is the type genus of its family. They are perennial herbs or evergreen shrubs. with jointed stems, opposite, simple leaves, and small, inconspicuous flowers in slender, terminal spikes. They are found in countries of East Asia such as China, Japan, and Korea. China uses Chloranthus plants for medical purposes.

The genomes of Chloranthus sessilifolius and Chloranthus spicatus have been sequenced by two independent research groups in 2021.

== Species ==
- Chloranthus angustifolius
- Chloranthus anhuiensis
- Chloranthus elatior
- Chloranthus fortunei
- Chloranthus henryi
- Chloranthus holostegius
- Chloranthus japonicus
- Chloranthus multistachys
- Chloranthus nervosus
- Chloranthus oldhamii
- Chloranthus serratus
- Chloranthus sessilifolius
- Chloranthus spicatus
- Chloranthus tianmushanensis
