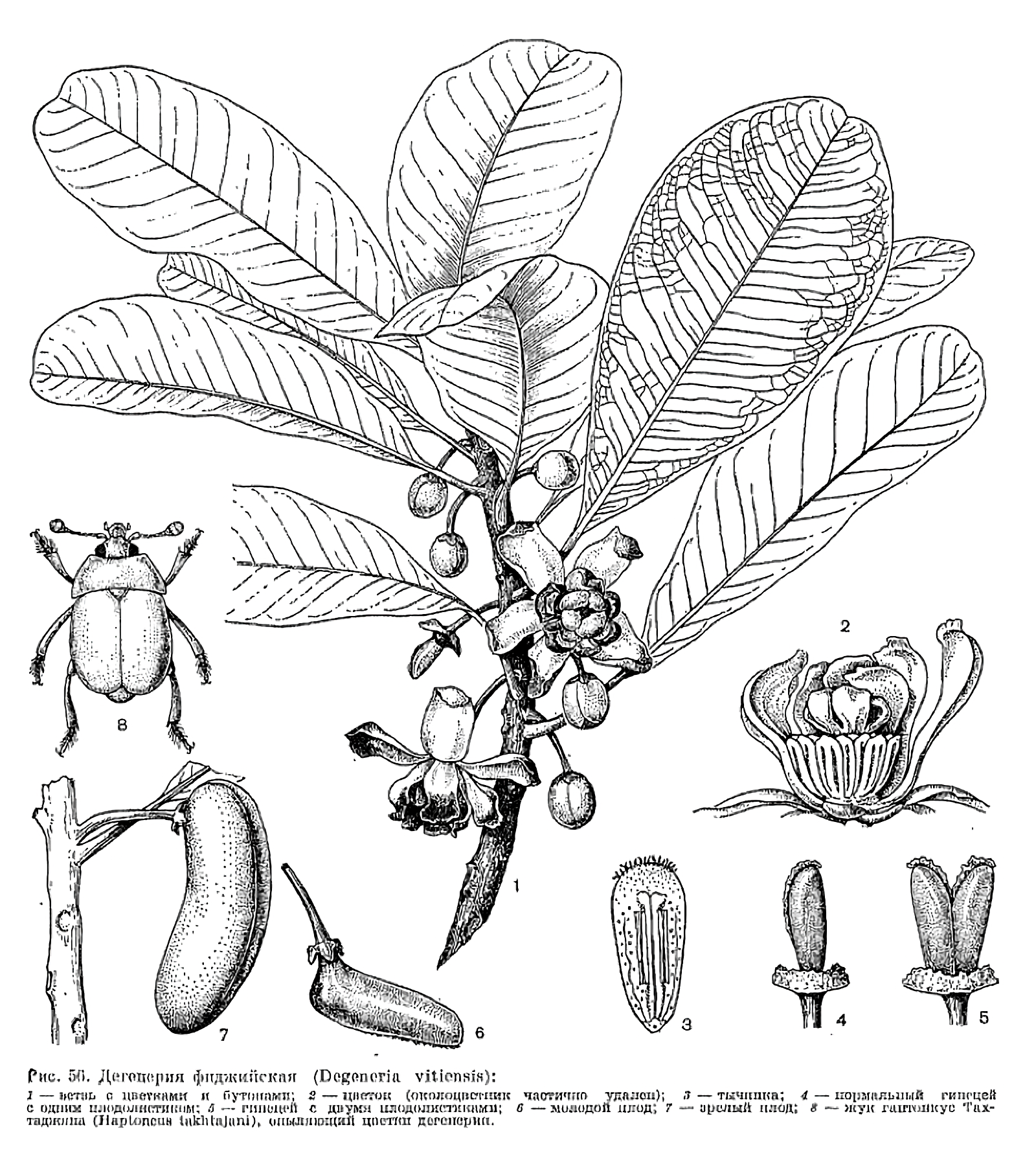
- Degeneria vitiensis

Scientific classification
- Kingdom: Plantae
- Clade: Tracheophytes
- Clade: Angiosperms
- Clade: Magnoliids
- Order: Magnoliales
- Family: Degeneriaceae; I.W.Bailey & A.C.Sm.
- Genus: Degeneria; I.W. Bailey & A.C.Sm.

Species
- Degeneria roseiflora; Degeneria vitiensis

= Degeneria =

Genus of flowering plants

Degeneria is a genus of flowering plants endemic to Fiji. It is the only genus in the family Degeneriaceae. The APG IV system of 2016 (unchanged from the APG system of 1998, the APG II system of 2003 and the APG III system of 2009), recognizes this family, and assigns it to the order Magnoliales in the clade magnoliids.

Degeneria was named after Otto Degener, who first found D. vitiensis in 1942. Classical studies of native stands of Degeneria from Vanua Levu and Viti Levu islands were conducted more than 30 years ago.

A 45-cent stamp issued in 1988 depicted a flowering branch of Degeneria vitiensis. This species appears on Fiji's five-dollar bill. A one-dollar 1988 philatelic commemorated the discovery of Degeneria roseiflora earlier in that same year.

The genus contains two species of trees, both native to Fiji:

- Degeneria roseiflora John M.Mill. – Vanua Levu, Taveuni – karawa
- Degeneria vitiensis L.W.Bailey & A.C.Sm. – Viti Levu – masiratu.

== Floral structure ==
The stage-specific movements of floral organs, including scent emissions of degenerias studied by Miller in 1989, are remarkably similar to those observed in other Magnoliales. Further, the floral structure of Degeneria is unusual, considered to be primitive among the flowering plants. The stamens are similar to those in Austrobaileya, Galbulimima, and some Magnoliaceae; they do not have distinguishable anther, filament, and connective, but instead are leaf-like, with two pairs of microsporangia embedded in the surface. There are three veins, rather than the single vein in the stamen of most flowering plants. The gynoecium develops in an unusual way, similar to Winteraceae, with laminal placentation, i.e., the young carpel is cup-shaped, and the ovules develop on its upper surface. The margins of the carpel never fully fuse. A cleft remains filled with hairs, through which the pollen tubes grow towards the ovules.
