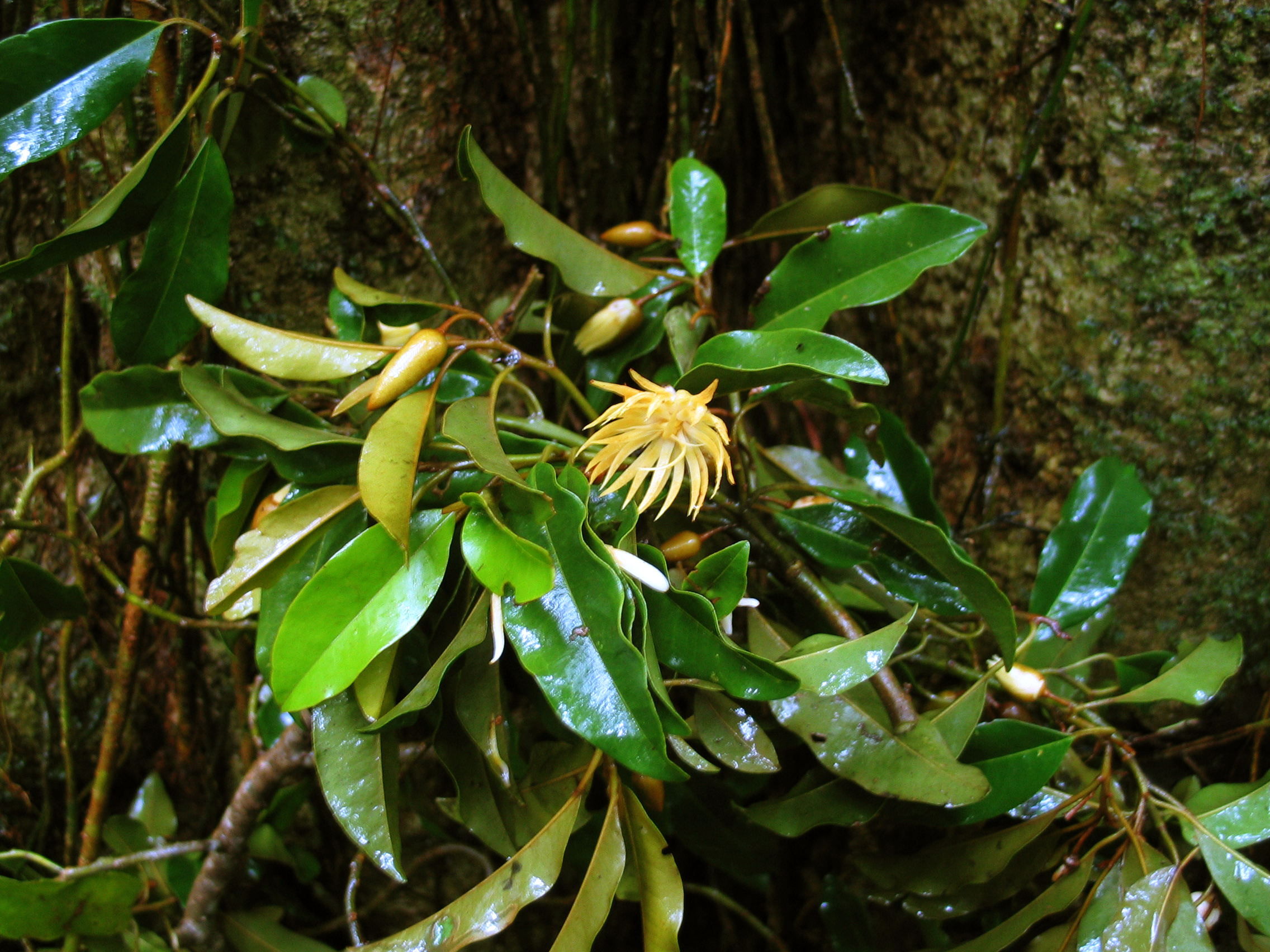

Conservation status
- Least Concern (IUCN 3.1)

Scientific classification
- Kingdom: Plantae
- Clade: Tracheophytes
- Clade: Angiosperms
- Clade: Magnoliids
- Order: Magnoliales
- Family: Himantandraceae
- Genus: Galbulimima
- Species: G. belgraveana

Binomial name
- Galbulimima belgraveana (F.Muell.) Sprague

Synonyms
- Eupomatia belgraveana F.Muell.; Galbulimima baccata F.M.Bailey; Galbulimima nitida (Baker f. & Norman) Sprague; Galbulimima parvifolia (Baker f. & Norman) Sprague; Himantandra baccata (F.M.Bailey) Diels; Himantandra nitida Baker f. & C.Norman; Himantandra parvifolia Baker f. & C.Norman

= Galbulimima belgraveana =

Species of flowering plant

Galbulimima belgraveana is a tropical forest tree with hallucinogenic properties. Its common names include agara, white magnolia and pigeonberry ash. It is native to Queensland, the Bismarck Archipelago, New Guinea, and the Solomon Islands.

== Description ==
An unbuttresssed, tropical forest tree, of magnolia-like appearance, reaching a height of 27m (90ft). Bark circa 1cm thick, greyish-brown, scaly, highly aromatic. The leaves (rusty/felted when young) are elliptic and entire, glossy, metallic green above and brown-felted beneath, 11-15cm in length by 5-7cm in breadth. The curious yellowish flowers lack both petals and sepals, but have numerous petaloid stamens protruding from a rusty brown calyx. The reddish, fleshy and fibrous fruit is globose to ellipsoidal in shape and circa 2cm in diameter.

== Hallucinogenic use ==
In Papua, the bark and leaves of the tree, alone or in combination with other species such as Homalomena (Araceae), are boiled together to prepare a tea. This tea is said to cause violent intoxication, followed by deep sleep with vivid dreams and visions.

William Emboden gives a somewhat different account both of the use and of the effects of the Galbulimima/Homalomena mixture, observing that, on occasion, the plant parts involved may simply be chewed together (rather than always being brewed into a hallucinogenic tea) and placing the sequence of effects in a different order, in which "fits of violent intoxication accompanied by spectacular visions and dream-like states" (in a waking state) terminate eventually in "a deep somnolence" (rather than the vivid visions occurring in/ being confined to the deep sleep following the violent intoxication).

=== The experiment of Ogia and Lucy Hamilton Reid ===
The most important primary source in the history of the study of the hallucinogenic use of G. belgraveana is the account of a "bioassay" undertaken by a local inhabitant of Okapa named Ogia, at the suggestion of nutritionist Lucy Hamilton Reid, a pioneer in the study of the mystery disease kuru (a prion encephalopathy closely related to Creutzfeldt-Jakob disease). In the year 1957, the Australian dietician Lucy Hamilton (a.k.a. Mrs. J. Reid and Lucy M. Hamilton Reid) conducted an experiment at Okapa in the Eastern Highlands of Papua New Guinea to observe the effects upon local resident Ogia of chewing (in combination) two local plant drugs: a substance called "agara" bark, identified as the species Galbulimima belgraveana (F. Muell.) Sprague and a (to this day unidentified) species belonging to the Araceous genus Homalomena French ethnobotanist Jacques Barrau was also present as an observer while this experiment was taking place.
The experiment was not a strictly-controlled one involving Galbulimima bark alone, but rather a demonstration by Ogia of his simultaneous use of no fewer than four local psychoactive drugs: he chewed and swallowed about eight pieces of agara (G. belgraveana) bark "about the size of a penny". While he was doing this, he also ate the dried leaves of ereriba (genus Homalomena), chewed some ginger (Zingiber sp. or possibly the rhizome of some other Zingiberaceous plant - unstated whether fresh or dry) and smoked some tobacco (the Nicotiana species involved was not stated).
The effects of the chewing and smoking manifested themselves soon afterward: Ogia's arms and upper body (but not his legs) began to tremble "like (those of) a kuru meri" (= person infected with kuru). A few minutes later he suddenly became agitated, knocking everything from a table top to the floor and having to be restrained (by a policeman in attendance) from doing further damage to his surroundings: despite having been placed in handcuffs he threatened various people with a stick and (more worryingly) tried to appropriate a workman's knife. So concerned were those trying to restrain him that they urged the women of the settlement to keep their children indoors in case he should harm them.
Hamilton was struck by the profound change wrought (temporarily) in Ogia by his simultaneous use of the four drugs: "from a pleasant mild little man, he had suddenly become a crazed being". She noted that, while intoxicated, "the pupils of his eyes were mere pinpoints", without, however drawing the possible inference that the cocktail of drugs taken by Ogia could have exerted acetylcholinesterase inhibition. Miosis (pinpoint pupils) can also be symptomatic of (among other conditions) intoxication by nicotine (Ogia had undoubtedly absorbed a certain amount of nicotine by smoking tobacco) and intoxication by opioids. Polydrug use, as described in this instance, also opens up the possibility of drug synergy involving aspects including potentiation and bioavailability.

== Chemistry ==
At least 40 alkaloids have been isolated from the plant, including the muscarinic receptor antagonist himbacine and the opioid antagonist GB18.

The psychoactive constituent(s) responsible for the plant's hallucinogenic effects have not yet been identified.

== Other uses ==
The tree produces a useful timber.

== Gallery ==
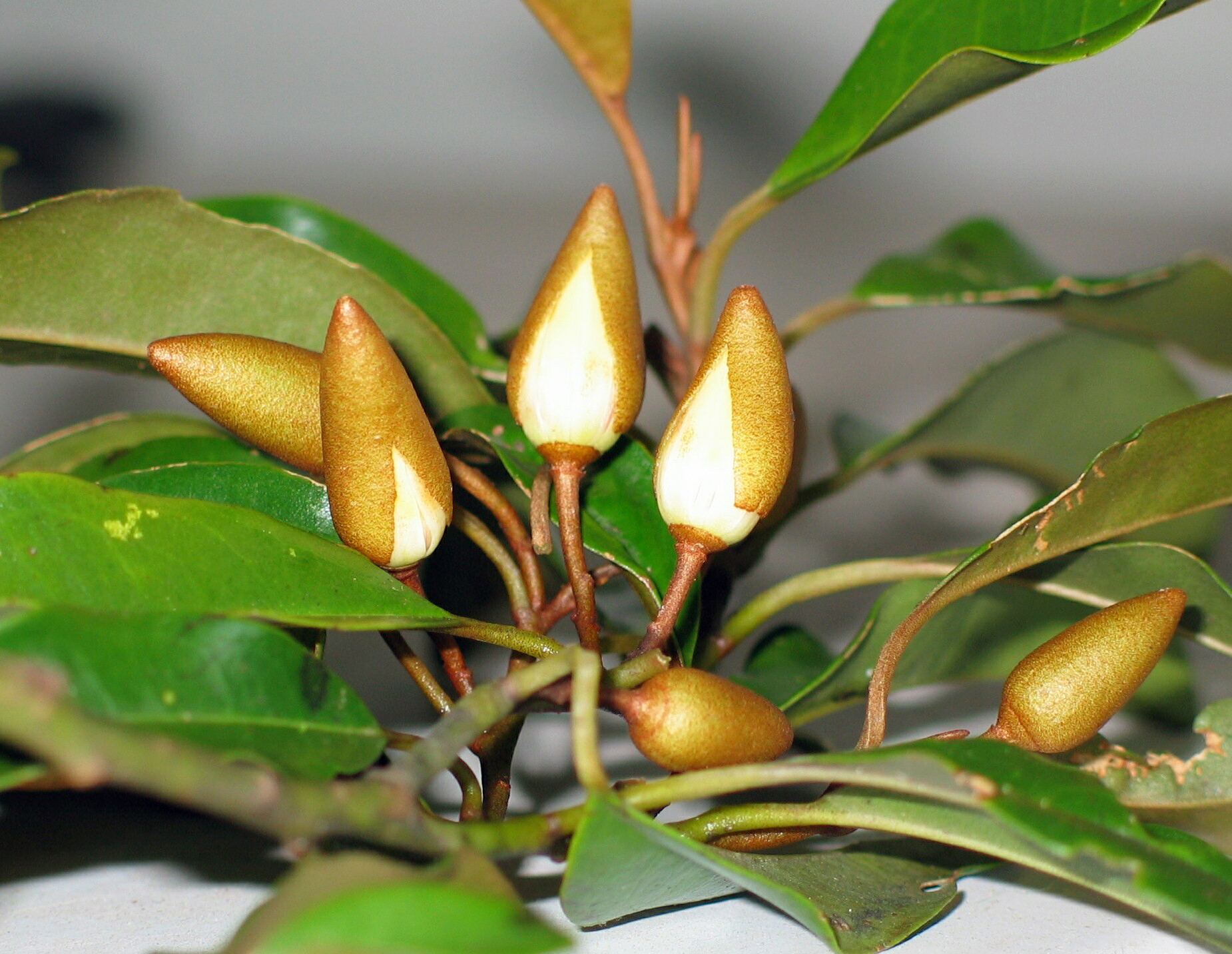
Flower buds

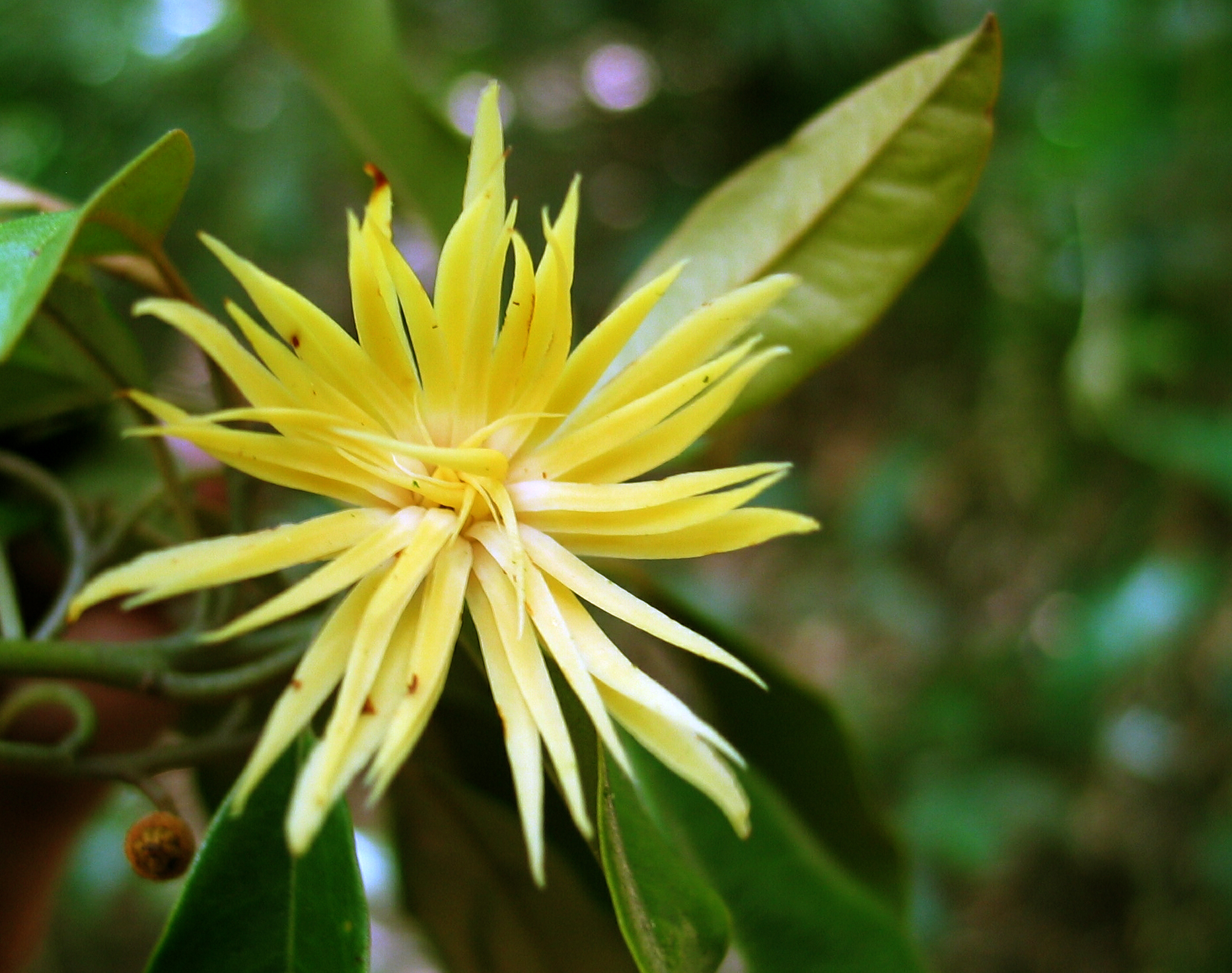
Closeup of single flower, showing petaloid stamens

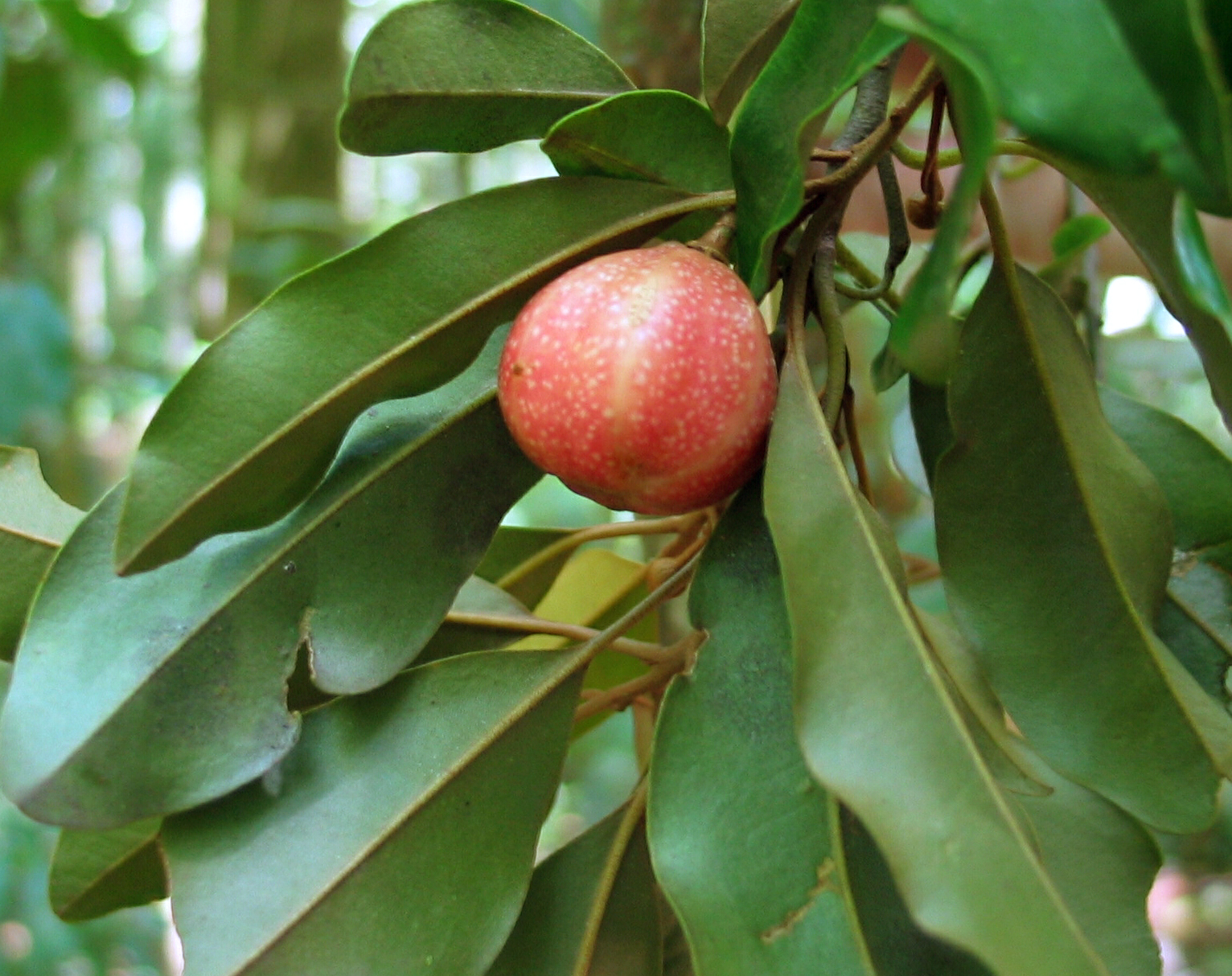
Ripe fruit.
