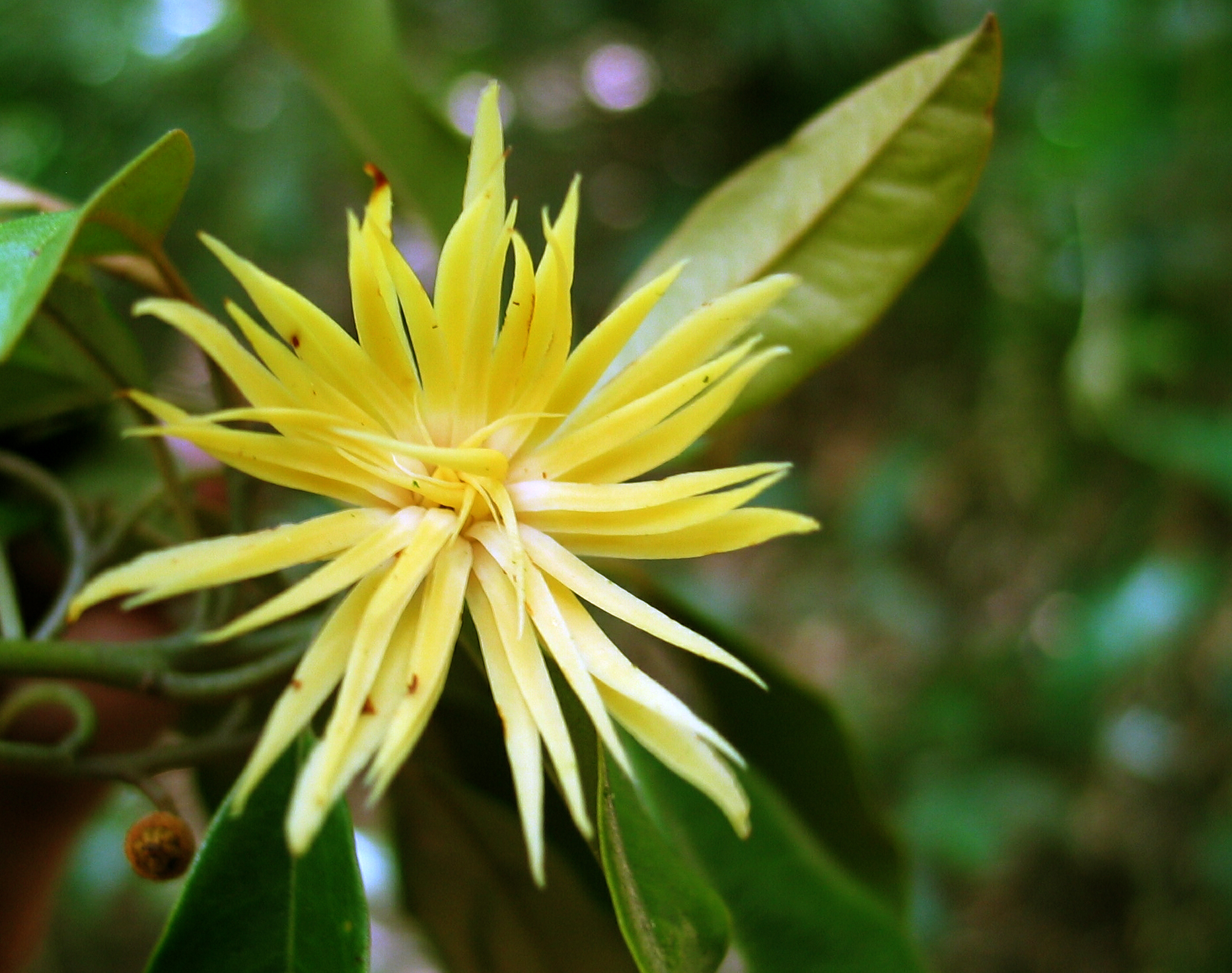
- Galbulimima belgraveana flower

Scientific classification
- Kingdom: Plantae
- Clade: Tracheophytes
- Clade: Angiosperms
- Clade: Magnoliids
- Order: Magnoliales
- Family: Himantandraceae
- Genus: Galbulimima; F.M.Bailey

Species
- Galbulimima baccata F.M.Bailey; Galbulimima belgraveana (F.Muell.) Sprague

Synonyms
- Himantandra F.Muell. ex Diels

= Galbulimima =

Genus of flowering plants

Galbulimima is a genus of flowering plants and the sole genus of the family Himantandraceae. One species of the family is found in the tropical zones of eastern Malaysia, the Moluccas, the Celebes, New Guinea, northern Australia and the Solomon Islands.

Being classified in the magnoliids, this family is part of neither the monocots nor the eudicots and is related to families such as the Annonaceae, the Degeneriaceae, the Eupomatiaceae and the Magnoliaceae.

The genus comprises from 1 to 3 species, according to different authorities, but Kew's authoritative Plants of the World Online recognises only Galbulimima belgraveana.
