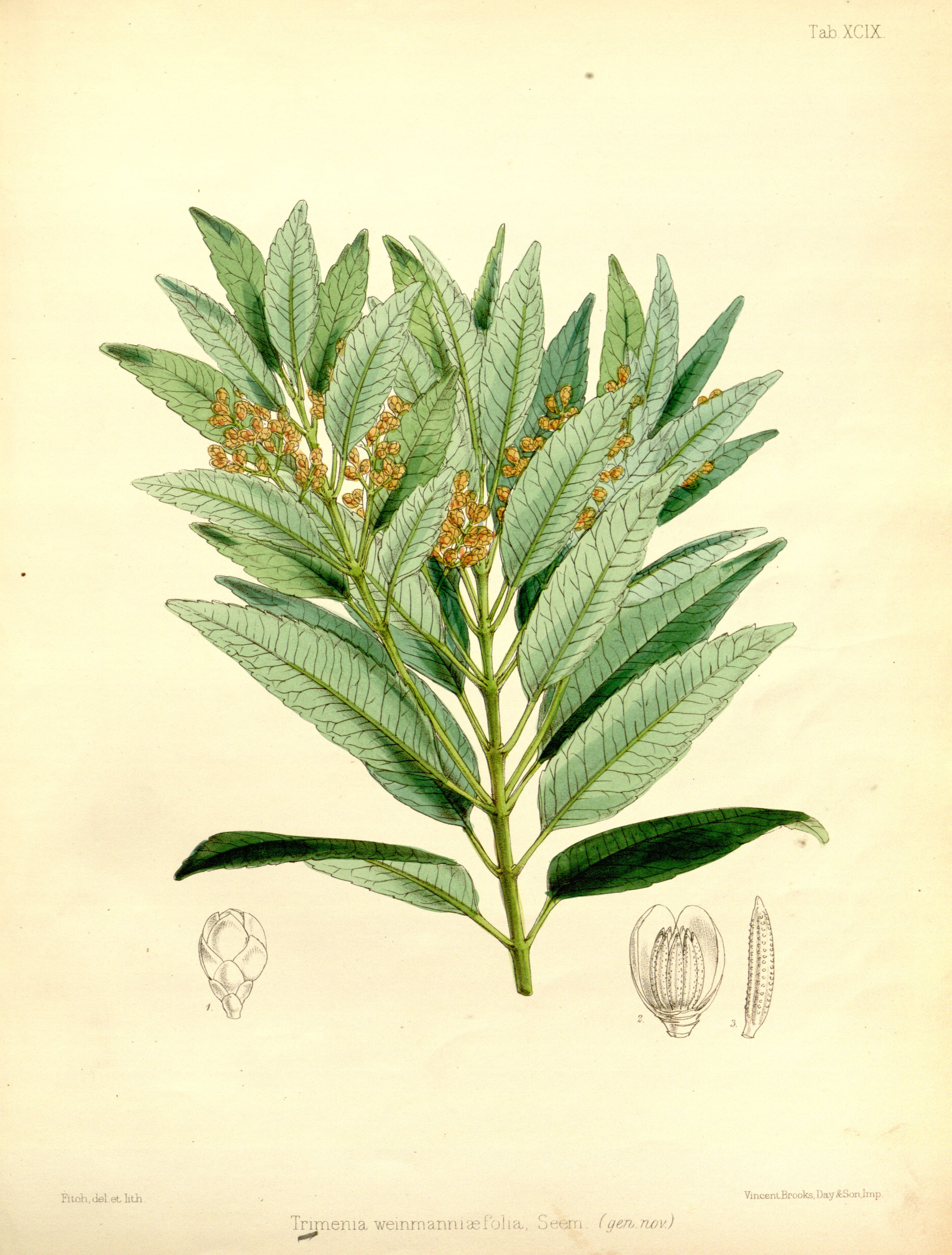
- Trimenia weinmanniifolia

Scientific classification
- Kingdom: Plantae
- Clade: Tracheophytes
- Clade: Angiosperms
- Order: Austrobaileyales
- Family: Trimeniaceae; L.S.Gibbs

Genera
- Trimenia

= Trimeniaceae =

Family of flowering plants

Trimeniaceae is a monotypic family of flowering plants recognized by most taxonomists, at least for the past several decades. It is a small family of one genus, Trimenia, with eight known species (Christenhusz & Byng 2016) of woody plants, bearing essential oils. The family is subtropical to tropical and found in Southeast Asia, eastern Australia and on several Pacific Islands.

== Taxonomy ==
=== APG IV ===
The APG IV system, of 2016, recognizes this family and places it in order Austrobaileyales, an order which is accepted as being among the most basal lineages in the clade angiosperms.

=== APG III ===
The APG III system, of 2009, also recognizes such a family and places it in order Austrobaileyales, an order which is accepted as being among the most basal lineages in the clade angiosperms.

=== APG II ===
The APG II system, of 2003, also recognizes such a family and places it in order Austrobaileyales, an order which is accepted as being among the most basal lineages in the clade angiosperms.

=== APG ===
The APG system, of 1998, also recognized this family, but left it unplaced as to order, and regarded it as being among the most basal lineages in the clade angiosperms.

=== Cronquist ===
The Cronquist system, of 1981, accepted this family and placed it in

the order Laurales,

in subclass Magnoliidae,

in class Magnoliopsida [=dicotyledons],

of division Magnoliophyta [=angiosperms].

=== Thorne ===
The Thorne system (1992) accepted this family and placed it in

the order Magnoliales,

in superorder Magnolianae,

in subclass Magnoliideae [=dicotyledons],

in class Magnoliopsida [=angiosperms].

=== Dahlgren ===
The Dahlgren system accepted this family and placed it in

the order Laurales,

in superorder Magnolianae,

in subclass Magnoliideae [=dicotyledons],

in class Magnoliopsida [=angiosperms].

=== Engler ===
The Engler system, in the update of 1964, accepted this family and placed it in

the order Magnoliales, which was placed

in subclass Archychlamydeae,

in class Dicotyledoneae,

in subdivision Angiospermae
