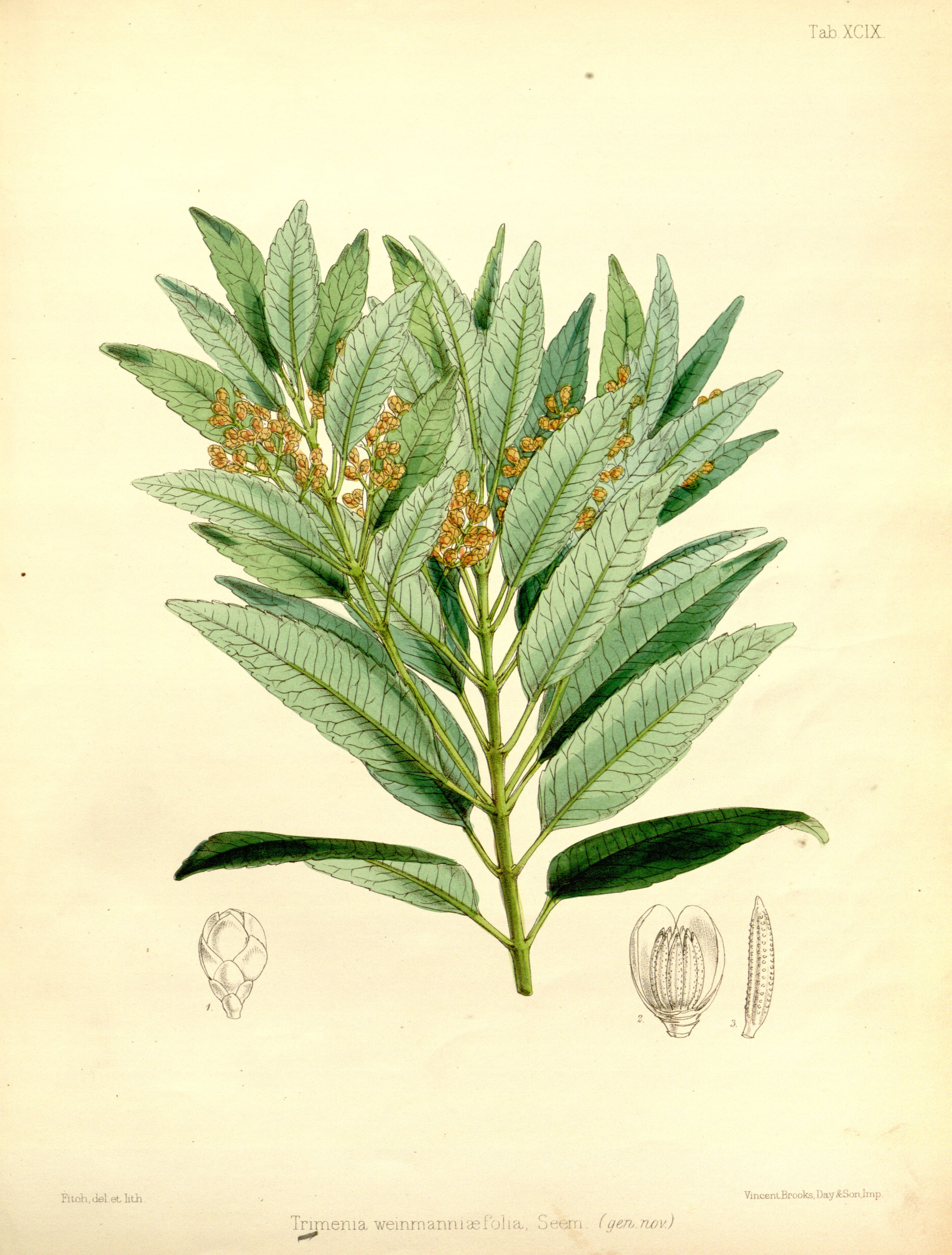
- Trimenia weinmanniifolia

Scientific classification
- Kingdom: Plantae
- Clade: Tracheophytes
- Clade: Angiosperms
- Order: Austrobaileyales
- Family: Trimeniaceae
- Genus: Trimenia; Seem. (1873)

Species
- 8; see text

Synonyms
- Piptocalyx Oliv. ex Benth. (1870)

= Trimenia (plant) =

Genus of flowering plants

Trimenia is a genus of plants in the family Trimeniaceae. It contains eight species which range from northeastern Australia and New Guinea to the South Pacific islands. It is the sole genus in family Trimeniaceae.

== Species ==
Eight species are accepted.

- Trimenia bougainvilleensis (Rodenb.) A.C.Sm. - Solomon Islands
- Trimenia macrura (Gilg & Schltr.) Philipson - New Guinea
- Trimenia marquesensis F.Br. - Marquesas
- Trimenia moorei (Oliv.) Philipson - New South Wales, Queensland
- Trimenia neocaledonica Baker f. - New Caledonia
- Trimenia nukuhivensis W.L.Wagner & Lorence - Marquesas
- Trimenia papuana Ridl. - New Guinea
- Trimenia weinmanniifolia Seem. - Fiji, Samoa
