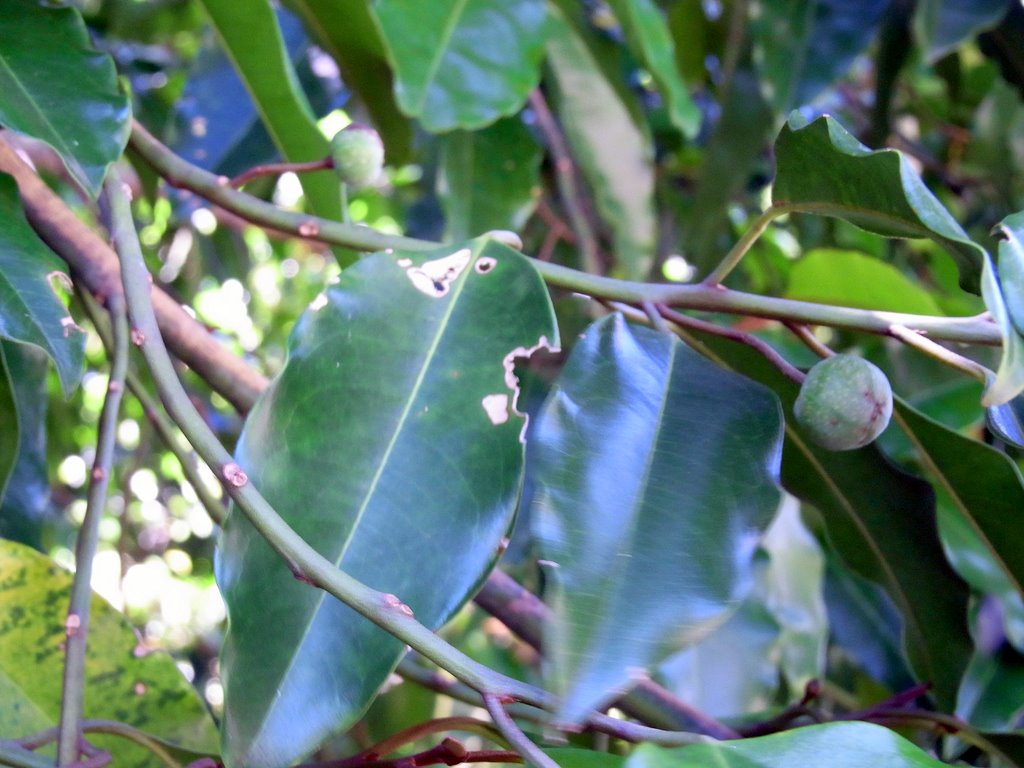
- Galbulimima baccata

Scientific classification
- Kingdom: Plantae
- Clade: Tracheophytes
- Clade: Angiosperms
- Clade: Magnoliids
- Order: Magnoliales
- Family: Himantandraceae; Diels

Genera
- Galbulimima

= Himantandraceae =

Family of plants

Himantandraceae is a family of flowering plants recognized by the APG II system of 2003, assigned to the order Magnoliales in the clade magnoliids. The family consists of only one genus, Galbulimima, of probably two species, trees and shrubs, found in tropical areas in Southeast Asia and Australia.

Plants in this family are aromatic trees covered with peltate, scaly indumentum. The leaves are entire and alternate, but stipules are absent. Flowers are either solitary or paired on short axillary branches. Each flower contains about seven petals and about forty stamens, though the stamens and petals look very similar.
