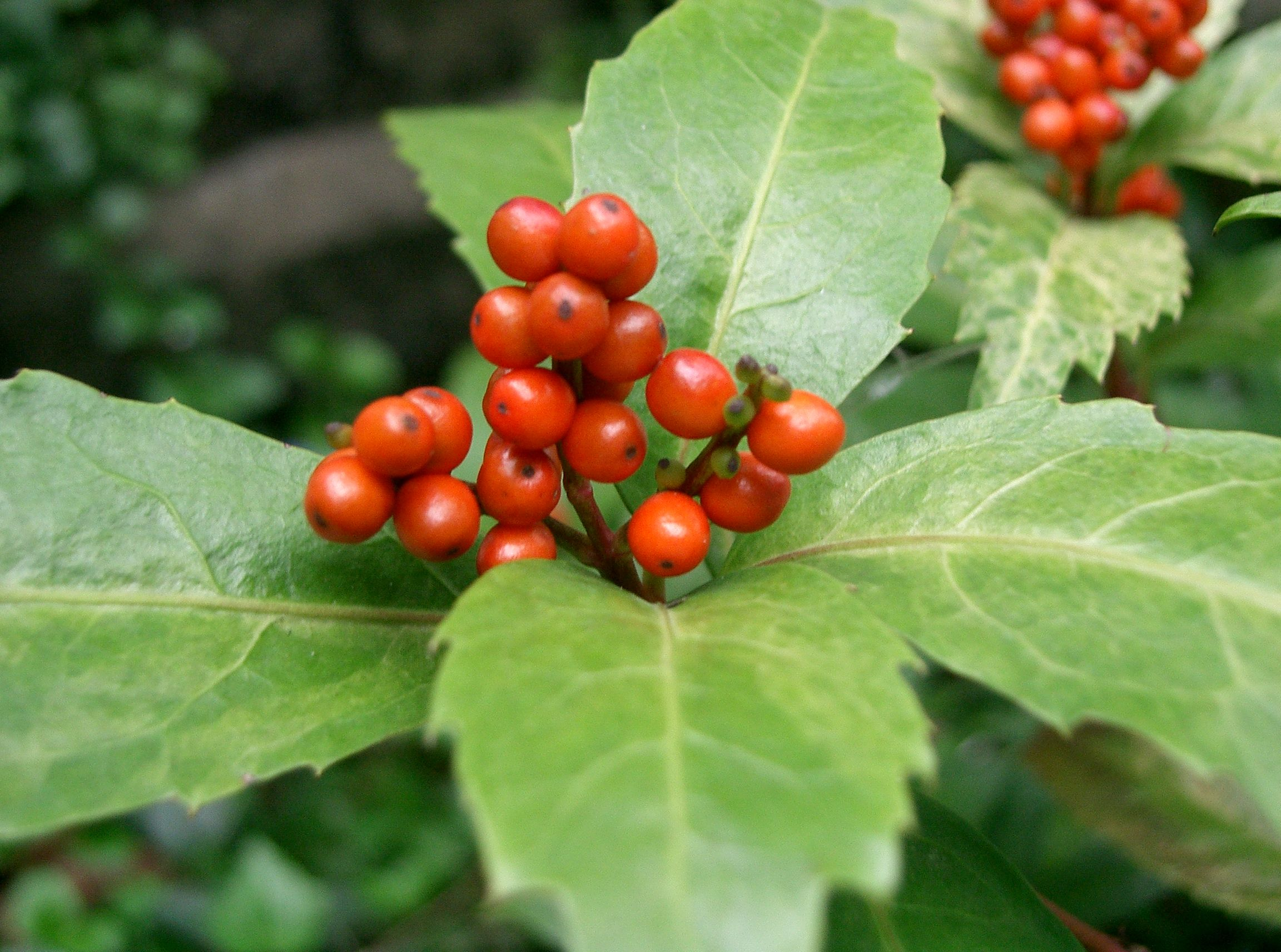
- Sarcandra glabra
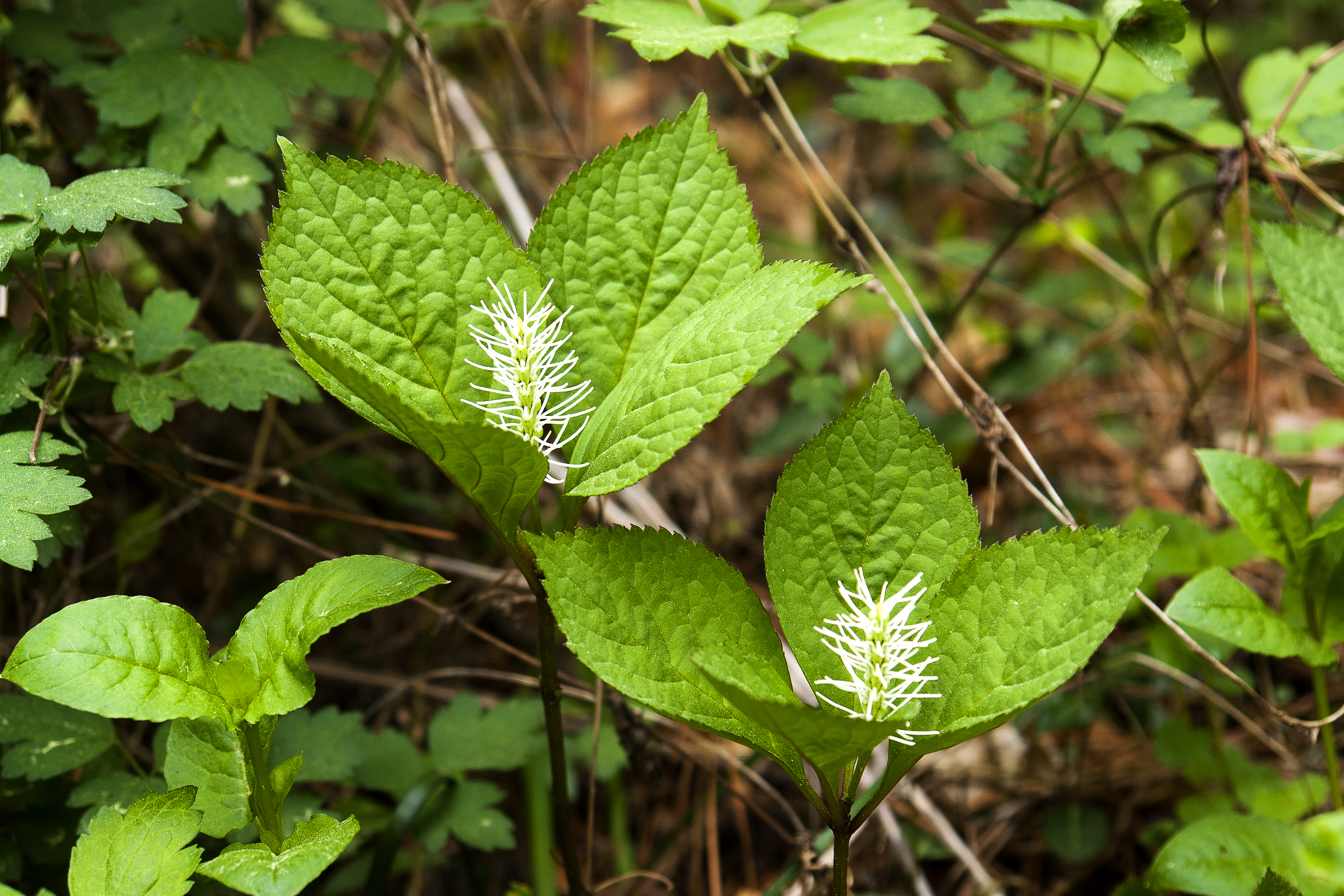
- Chloranthus fortunei

Scientific classification
- Kingdom: Plantae
- Clade: Tracheophytes
- Clade: Angiosperms
- Order: Chloranthales; R.Br.
- Family: Chloranthaceae; R.Br. ex Sims

Genera
- Ascarina J.R.Forst. & G.Forst.; Chloranthus Sw.; Hedyosmum Sw.; Sarcandra Gardner

= Chloranthaceae =

Chloranthaceae Temporal range: Barremian - recent

Family of flowering plants

Chloranthaceae is a family of flowering plants (angiosperms), the only family in the order Chloranthales. It is not closely related to any other family of flowering plants, and is among the early-diverging lineages in the angiosperms. They are woody or weakly woody plants occurring in Southeast Asia, the Pacific, Madagascar, Central and South America, and the West Indies. The family consists of four extant genera, totalling about 77 known species according to Christenhusz and Byng in 2016. Some species are used in traditional medicine. The type genus is Chloranthus. The fossil record of the family, mostly represented by pollen such as Clavatipollenites, extends back to the dawn of the history of flowering plants in the Early Cretaceous, and has been found on all continents.

== Description ==
Chloranthaceae are fragrant shrubs or herbaceous plants, that only produce new side branches on the new growth. The stems are mostly cylindrical, with solid internodes, thickened nodes in many species, that carry evergreen leaves arranged in pairs on opposite sides of the stem, with stipules that have merged with that of the opposing leaf. The small flowers are seated directly on the axis of the inflorescence. Petals are absent in this family, and sometimes so are sepals. The flowers can be either hermaphrodite or of separate sexes. The fruit is a drupe or berry, consisting of one carpel.

=== Differences between the genera ===
The four genera assigned to this family can be distinguished from each other by the following characters:

Sarcandra species are shrubs whose wood lacks vessels. They have bisexual flowers, with only one, club-shaped, stamen, in which the connective tissue (between the anther lobes which carry the pollen) is wide, and with a smooth and moist stigma. This genus has four species, which occur in Malaysia, China, Indochina, Japan, India, and Sri Lanka.

Chloranthus species are dwarf shrubs or herbaceous plants, with xylem that contains vessels. Flowers are bisexual, each of which bears three stamens on straight filaments with three anther lobes and a wide connective, and with a smooth and moist stigma. The 20 species occur in southern and eastern Asia.

Ascarina has separate male and female flowers. The male flowers are subtended by two bracts and have between one and five stamens, in which the connective is not widened. The female flower is without bracts, the stigma is dry and covered in papillae. The fruit is a drupe-like berry. There are 12 species, which occur on islands in the Pacific and insular South-East Asia, from New Zealand and the Marquesas to Borneo, and on Madagascar.

Hedyosmum has separate male and female flowers. The male flowers are without bracts and have one stamen, in which the connective is not widened. The female flower is without bracts; the stigma is dry and covered in papillae. Female flowers have a 3-lobed calyx. The fruit, a drupe, has a kernel with a hard and woody shell. There are 43 species found in Latin America, including the Antilles, as well as one species found in Southeast Asia.

== Taxonomy ==
The Chloranthaceae have been recognised as a family in most classifications but without clear relatives. Molecular systematics studies have shown that it is not closely related to any other family and is among the early-diverging lineages in the angiosperms. In particular, it is neither a eudicot nor a monocot. Fossils assigned to Chloranthaceae, or closely related to the family, are among the oldest angiosperms known. The APG II system (2003) left the family unplaced as to order, but the APG III system (2009) accepted Chloranthales, containing only this family. The cladogram below, from the APG IV system (2016), shows the Chloranthales in a trichotomy with the magnoliids and the monocot-Ceratophyllales-dicot clade. Earlier, the order was grouped with magnoliids, but studies in 2014 did not support this placement, leaving its phylogeny unclear. A 2021 study sequenced the Chloranthus genome and found Chloranthales as sister to magnoliids.

- angiosperms
  - Amborellales
  - - Nymphaeales
    - - Austrobaileyales
      - - - magnoliids
          - Chloranthales
        - - monocots
          - - Ceratophyllales
            - eudicots

A 2004 study based on comparisons of homologous DNA fragments indicated that both the family Chloranthaceae and its extant genera Ascarina, Chloranthus, Hedyosmum and Sarcandra are probably monophyletic, with Hedyosmum being the first to diverge from the rest, and Ascarina being the sister group of the clade consisting of Sarcandra and Chloranthus. As of June 2016, these four extant genera are recognized, and insights into their relationships are expressed in the tree below:

- Chloranthaceae
  - - - - Chloranthus
        - Sarcandra
      - Ascarina
    - Hedyosmum

The extinct genus Chloranthistemon also belongs to this family.

=== Historical classifications ===
The Cronquist system (1981) assigned the family

to the order Piperales

in subclass Magnoliidae

in class Magnoliopsida [=dicotyledons]

of division Magnoliophyta [=angiosperms].

The Thorne system (1992) placed it

in the order Magnoliales, which was assigned

to superorder Magnolianae

in subclass Magnoliideae [=dicotyledons],

in class Magnoliopsida [=angiosperms].

The Dahlgren system raised the family to be

its own order Chloranthales, which was assigned

to superorder Magnolianae

in subclass Magnoliideae [=dicotyledons],

in class Magnoliopsida [=angiosperms].
