= C38H42N2O6 =

The molecular formula C_{38}H_{42}N_{2}O_{6} (molar mass : 622.74 g/mol) may refer to:

- Cycleanine, a selective vascular calcium antagonist
- Rodiasine, an alkaloid
- Tetrandrine, a calcium channel blocker
