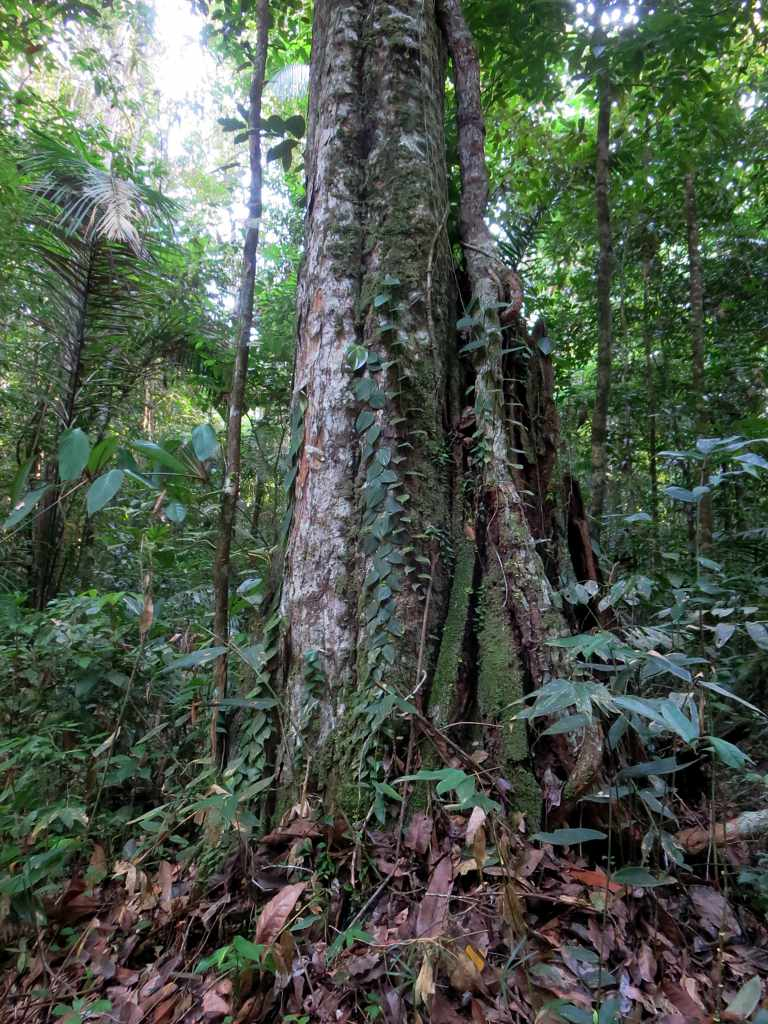
- Chlorocardium rodiei

Scientific classification
- Kingdom: Plantae
- Clade: Tracheophytes
- Clade: Angiosperms
- Clade: Magnoliids
- Order: Laurales
- Family: Lauraceae
- Genus: Chlorocardium; Rohwer, H.G.Richt. & van der Werff

Species
- Chlorocardium esmeraldense van der Werff; Chlorocardium rodiei (R.H.Schomb.) Rohwer, H.G.Richt. & van der Werff; Chlorocardium venenosum (Kosterm. & Pinkley) Rohwer, H.G.Richt. & van der Werff

= Chlorocardium =

Genus of trees

Chlorocardium is a genus of the family Lauraceae. It contains only three species, C. esmeraldense, C. rodiei and C. venenosum, and is native to northern South America. The name Chlorocardium means green (chloro-) heart (cardia), referring to the wood.

They are trees up to 40 m high, mostly 30 m high, and are hermaphrodites. They are slow-growing canopy evergreen trees and have a valuable timber. The wood and bark are pleasantly scented. They are present in Peru, Ecuador, Colombia, and the Guiana Shield (in northeastern Brazil, Venezuela (Amazonas, Bolívar and Delta Amacuro states), Guyana, Suriname and French Guiana).

The species are heavily used by the timber industry. This causes a shortage of mature trees. Their timber is of great commercial value and much exploited, but C. rodiei is able to produce sprouts from more than 50% of stumps.

== Ecology ==
Trees of this genus grow in evergreen tropical forests. The ecological requirements are those of moisture precipitating almost continuously in cloud-cover for much of the year.

The fruit, a drupe, is an important food source for birds.

The common name in Guyana is greenheart or greenhart.
