= Tepal =

One of the outer parts of a flower

Diagram showing the parts of a mature flower. In this example the perianth is separated into a calyx (sepals) and corolla (petals)

A tepal is one of the outer parts of a flower (collectively the perianth). The term is used when these parts cannot easily be classified as either sepals or petals. This may be because the parts of the perianth are undifferentiated (i.e., of very similar appearance), as in Magnolia, or because, although it is possible to distinguish an outer whorl of sepals from an inner whorl of petals, the sepals and petals have similar appearance (as in Lilium). The term was proposed by Augustin Pyramus de Candolle in 1827 and was constructed by analogy with the terms "petal" and "sepal". (De Candolle used the term perigonium or perigone for the tepals collectively; the term is since used as a synonym for perianth.)

== Origin ==
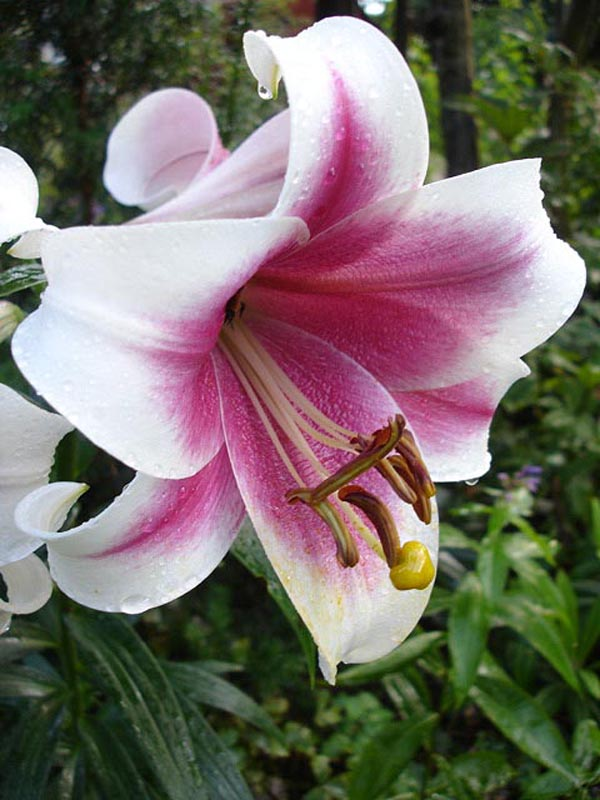
A Lilium flower showing the six tepals: the outer three are sepals and the inner three are petals.

Undifferentiated tepals are believed to be the ancestral condition in flowering plants. For example, Amborella, which is thought to have separated earliest in the evolution of flowering plants, has flowers with undifferentiated tepals. Distinct petals and sepals would therefore have arisen by differentiation, probably in response to animal pollination. In typical modern flowers, the outer or enclosing whorl of organs forms sepals, and is specialised for protection of the flower bud as it develops, while the inner whorl forms petals, which attract pollinators.

Tepals formed by similar sepals and petals are common in monocotyledons, particularly the "lilioid monocots". In tulips, for example, the first and second whorls both contain structures that look like petals. These are fused at the base to form one large, showy, six-parted structure (the perianth). In lilies the organs in the first whorl are separate from the second, but all look similar, thus all the showy parts are often called tepals. Where sepals and petals can in principle be distinguished, usage of the term "tepal" is not always consistent – some authors will refer to "sepals and petals" where others use "tepals" in the same context.

In some plants the flowers have no petals, and all the tepals are sepals modified to look like petals. These organs are described as petaloid, for example, the sepals of hellebores. When the undifferentiated tepals resemble petals, they are also referred to as "petaloid", as in petaloid monocots, orders of monocots with brightly coloured tepals. Since they include Liliales, an alternative name is lilioid monocots.

== Properties and shape ==
Terms used in the description of tepals include pubescent (with dense fine, short, soft hairs, downy), puberulent (minutely pubescent, hairs barely visible to the naked eye) and puberulous (dense covering of very short soft hairs). Tepal shape is described in similar terms to those used for leaves (see Glossary of leaf morphology).

== Gallery ==
Flowers with tepals

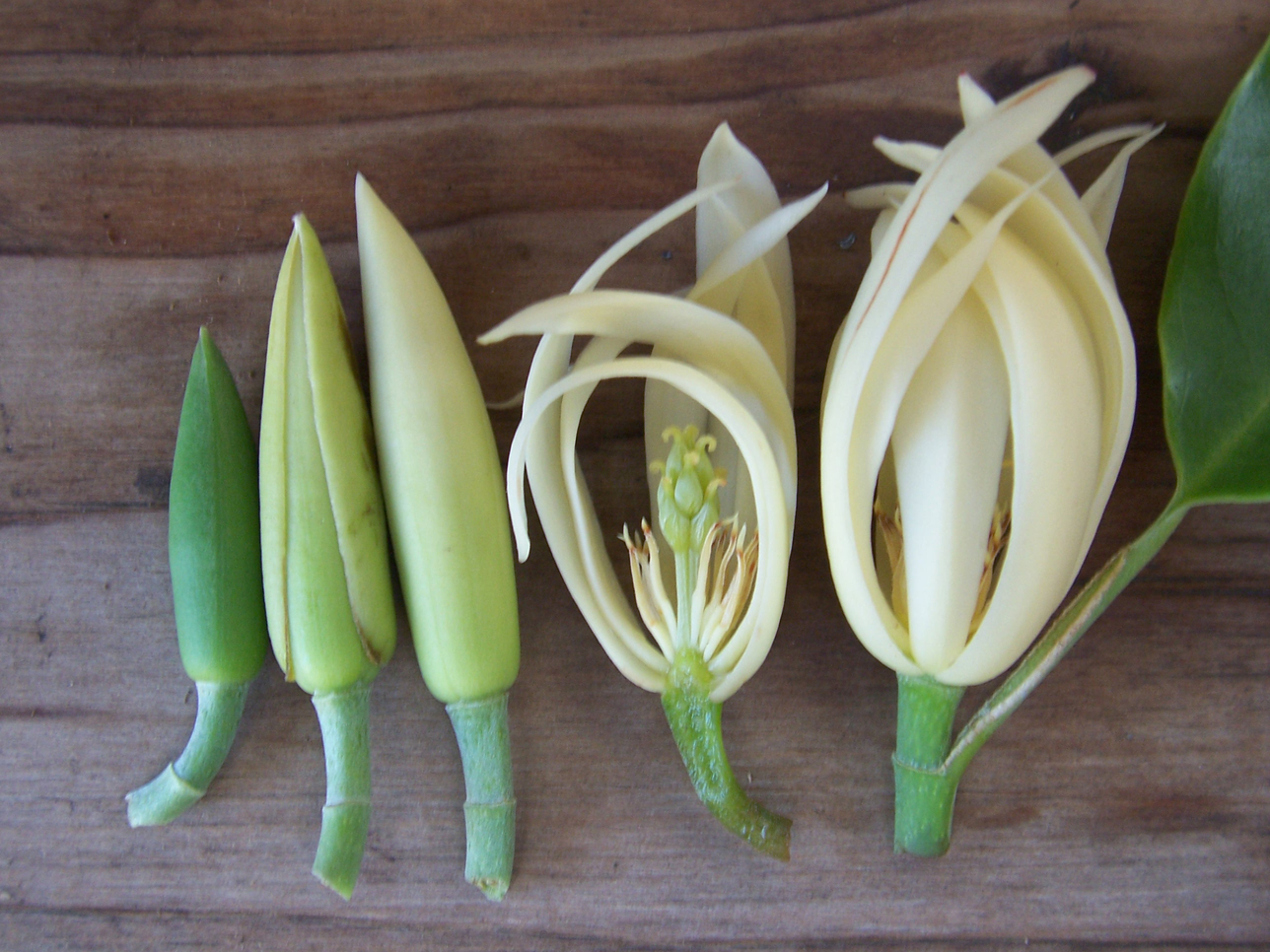
Flowers of Magnolia × alba showing tepals in various stages of development

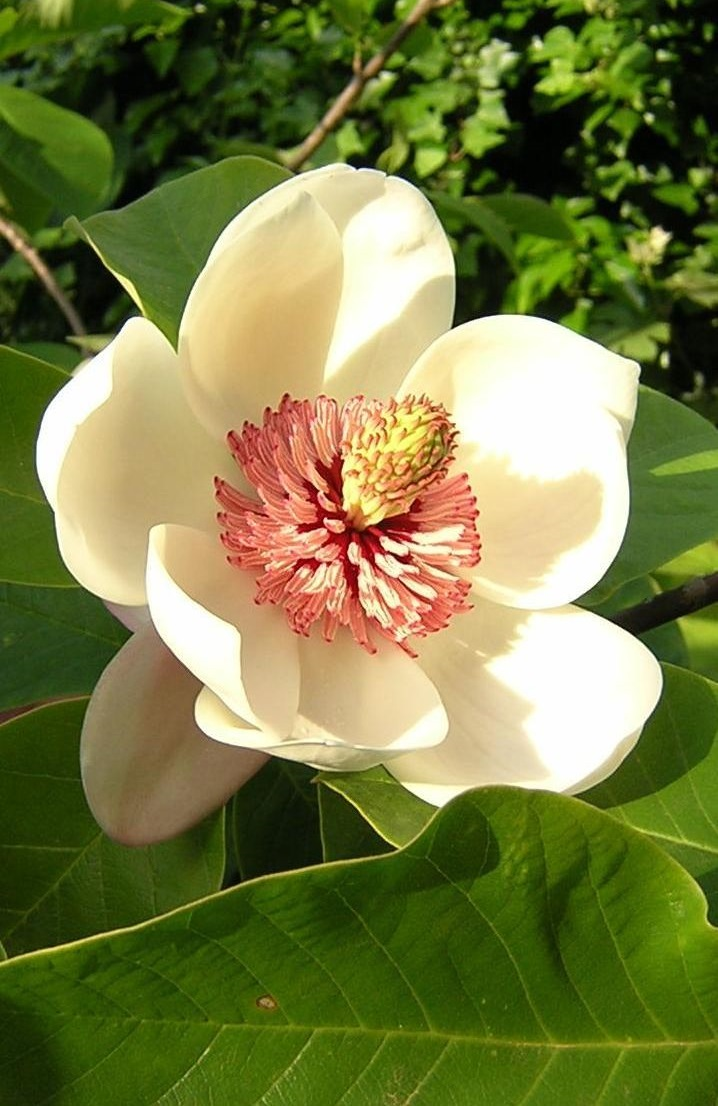
Tepals of Magnolia × wieseneri

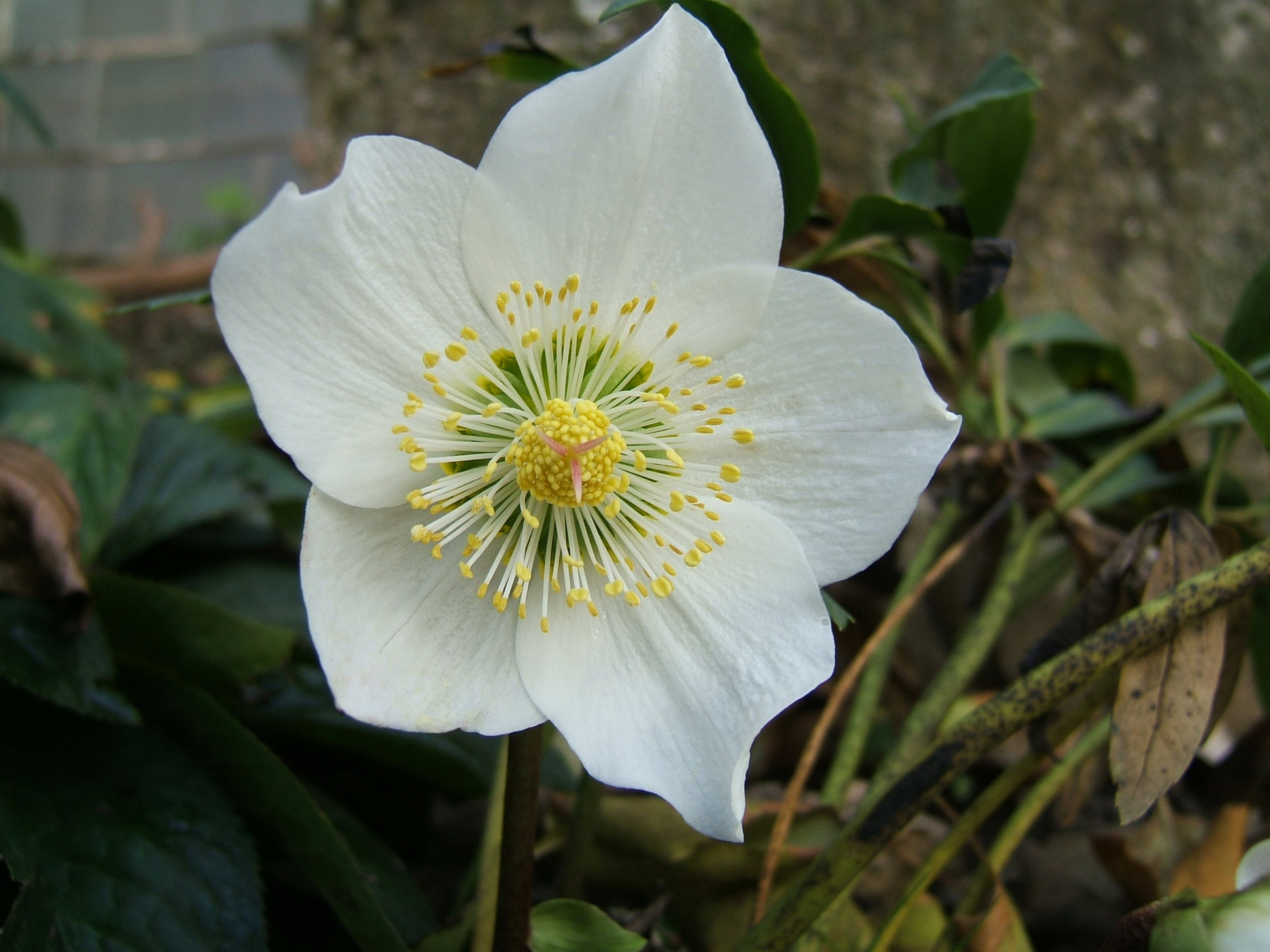
A hellebore flower showing the petaloid sepals

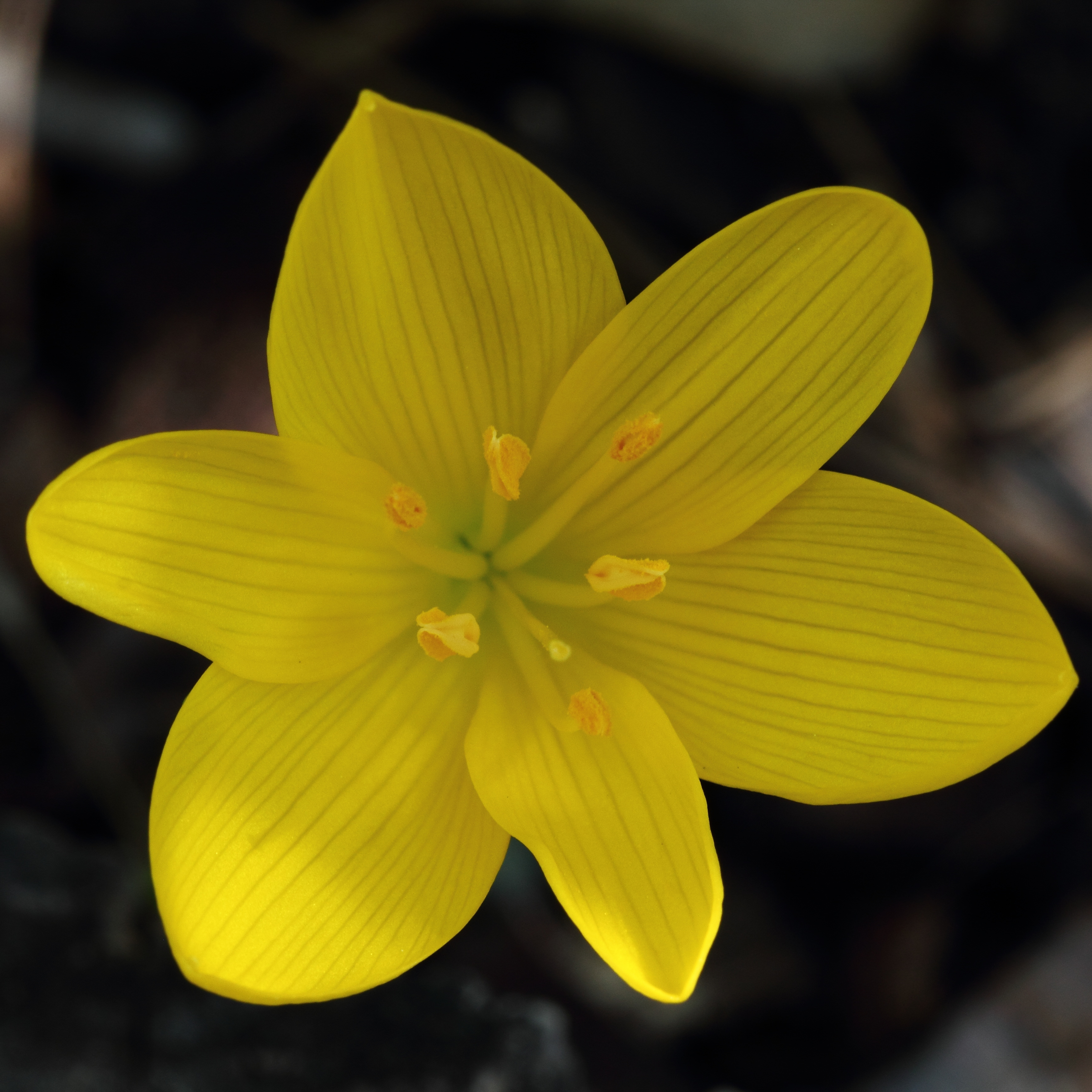
A Sternbergia lutea flower showing the two whorls of tepals

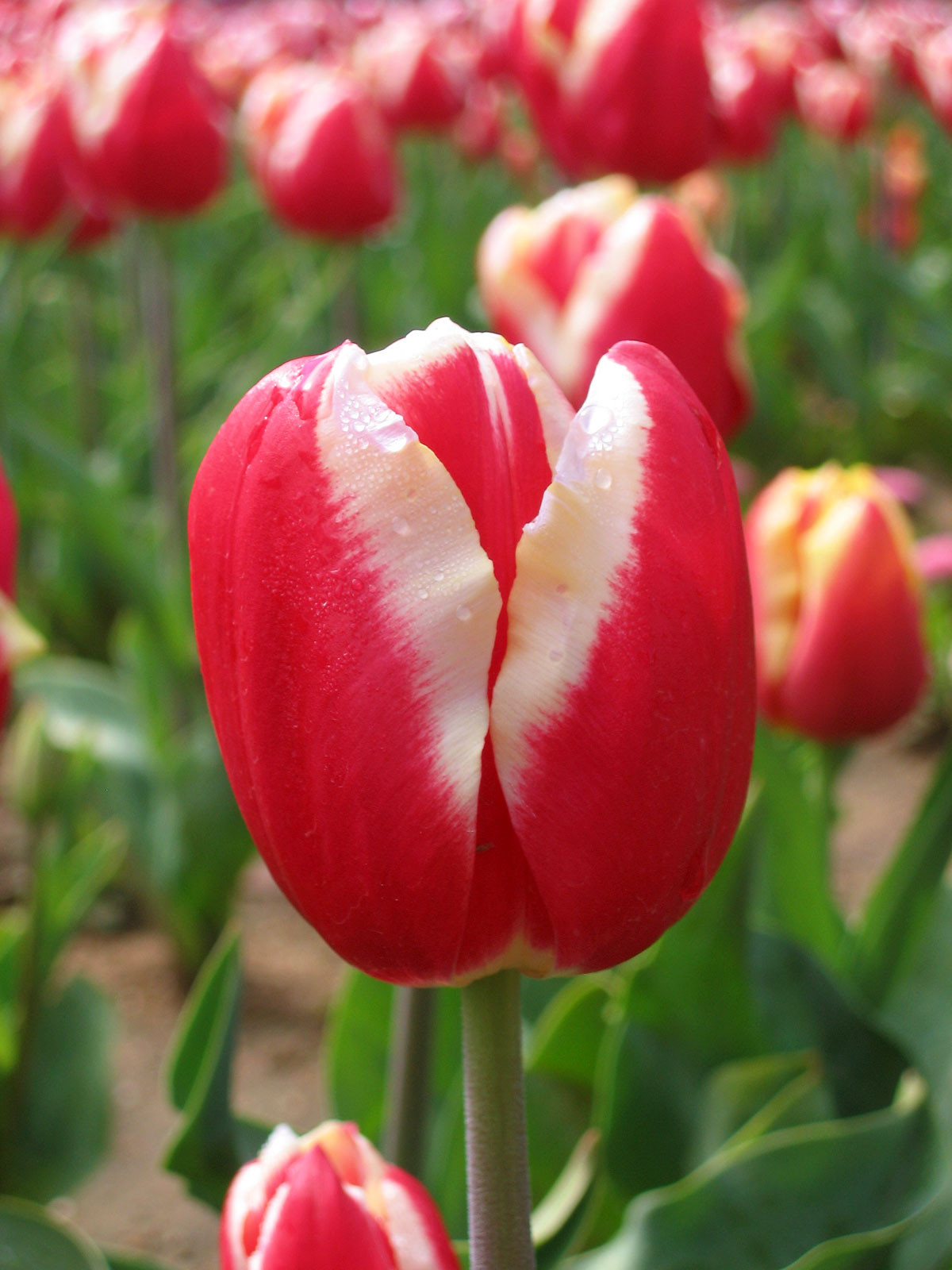
A tulip flower showing the petal-like tepals

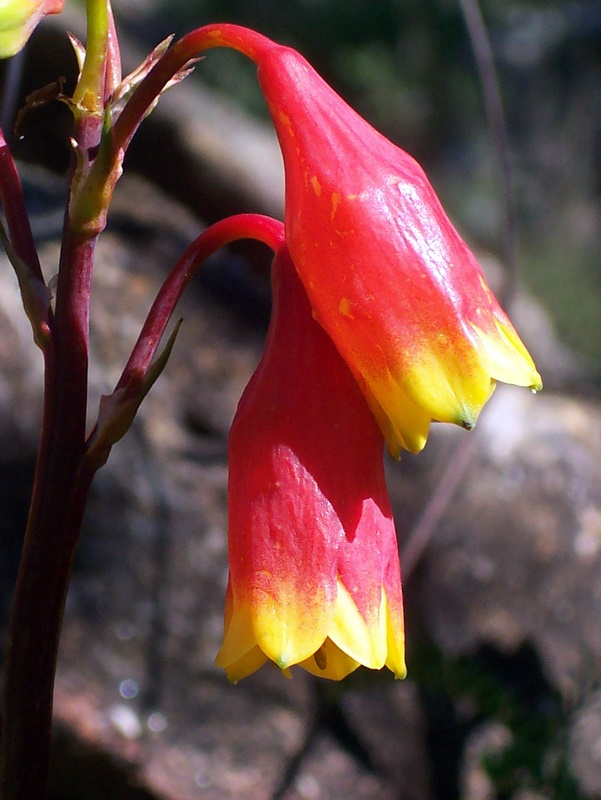
Tepals of Blandfordia nobilis, another lilioid monocot

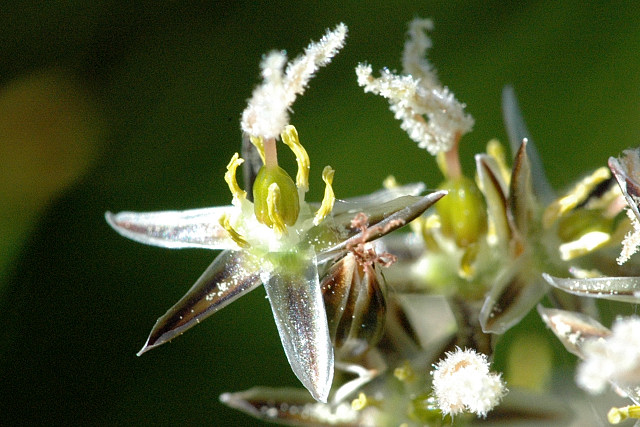
6 tepals (3 inner, 3 outer) of the rush Juncus squarrosus

== See also ==
- Glossary of plant morphology
- Plant reproductive morphology
