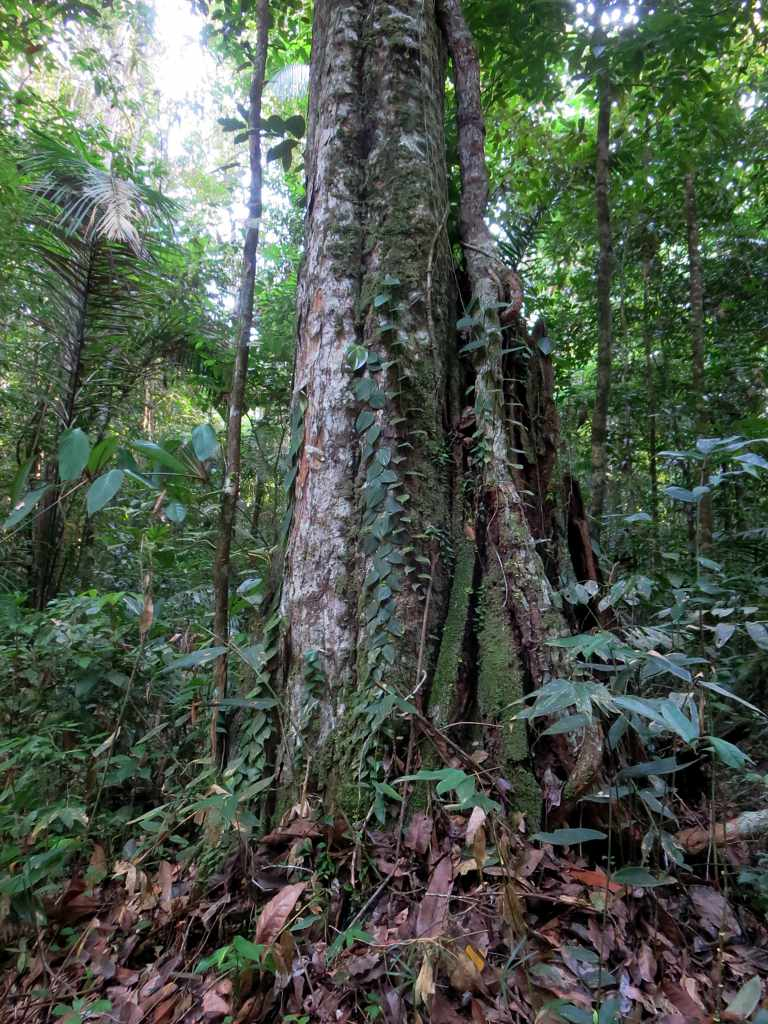

Conservation status
- Data Deficient (IUCN 3.1)

Scientific classification
- Kingdom: Plantae
- Clade: Embryophytes
- Clade: Tracheophytes
- Clade: Angiosperms
- Clade: Magnoliids
- Order: Laurales
- Family: Lauraceae
- Genus: Chlorocardium
- Species: C. rodiei

Binomial name
- Chlorocardium rodiei (M.R.Schomb.) Rohwer et al.

Synonyms
- Nectandra rodiei; Ocotea rodiei

= Chlorocardium rodiei =

Species of tree

Chlorocardium rodiei (greenheart) is a species of flowering plant in the family Lauraceae. It is one of three species in the genus Chlorocardium. It is native to Guyana and Suriname, both in South America. Other common names include cogwood, demerara greenheart, greenhart, ispingo moena, sipiri, bebeeru and bibiru.

It is an evergreen tree growing 15 to 30 m tall, with a trunk diameter of 35 to 60 cm. Its leaves are oppositely arranged and simple with smooth edges. Its fruit is a drupe containing a single seed.

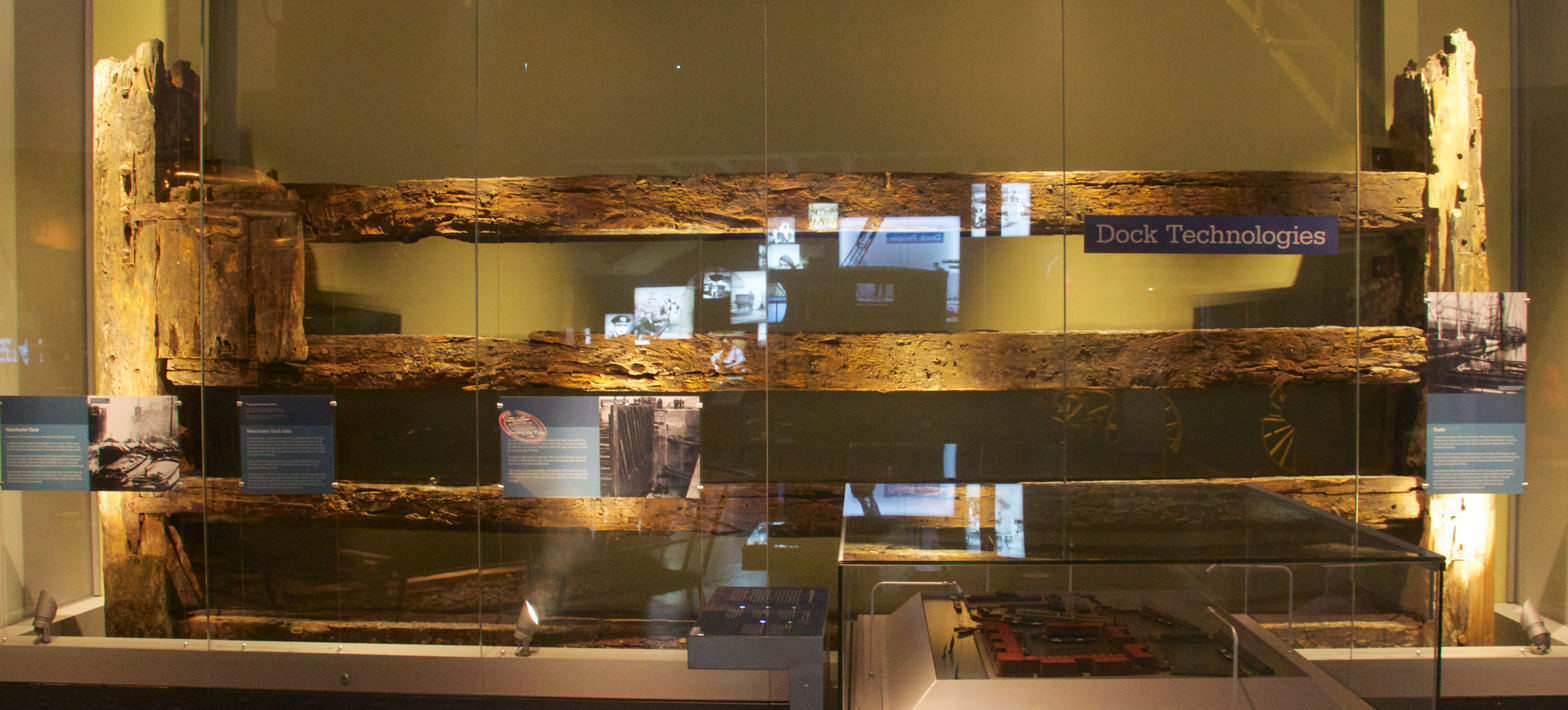
Greenheart wood was used to build the gate for the Manchester Dock in Liverpool.

The cyclic bisbenzylisoquinoline alkaloid rodiasine was first isolated from this species. The wood is extremely hard and strong and so it cannot be worked with standard tools. It is durable in marine conditions and so it is used to build docks and other structures. It was an early choice for fly fishing rods.

It is often sought for construction projects in parts of the Caribbean, where wood ants are problematic in conventional pine wood construction. It was also used to build the dock gates in Liverpool, such as the Manchester dock gate. It has been used extensively as marine piling, since it is highly resistant to marine borers. It is also extremely dense and does not float. It thus requires special water transport arrangements and is loaded onto specially-constructed pontoons for transport to sawmills or direct shipping overseas. As sawn lumber, it requires special treatment and saws with tungsten carbide teeth since standard steel saw blades cannot be maintained sharp enough to cut any reasonable quantity.

Greenheart was used to sheath the oak and Norwegian fir planks that made up Ernest Shackleton's barkentine icebreaker, Endurance, and the keel of the United States Coast Guard cutter USS Bear.

== Sources ==
- Niven, Jennifer. (2000). The Ice Master: The Doomed 1913 Voyage of the Karluk. New York: Hyperion. ISBN 0-7868-6529-6.
