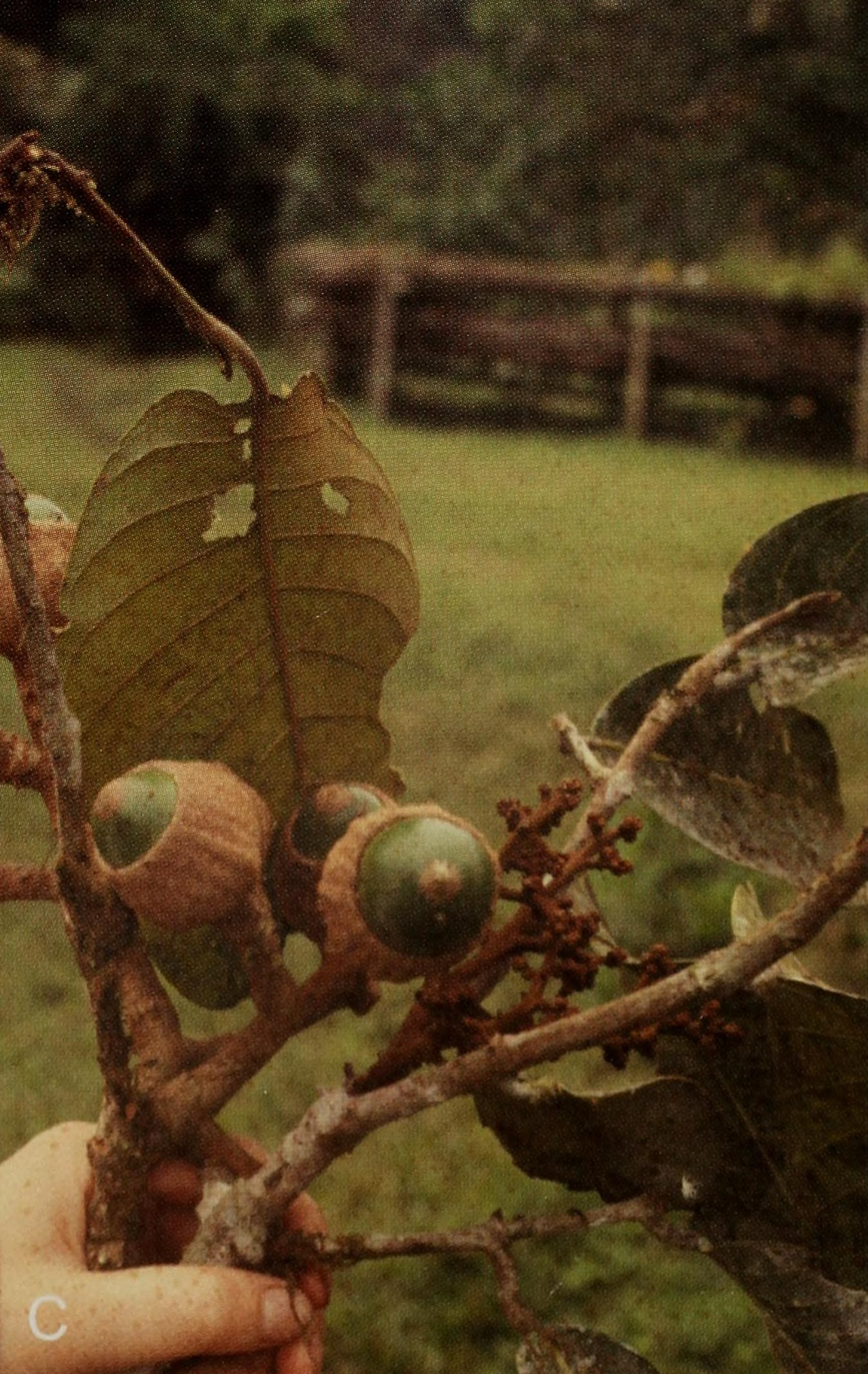

Conservation status
- Least Concern (IUCN 3.1)

Scientific classification
- Kingdom: Plantae
- Clade: Tracheophytes
- Clade: Angiosperms
- Clade: Magnoliids
- Order: Laurales
- Family: Lauraceae
- Genus: Chlorocardium
- Species: C. venenosum

Binomial name
- Chlorocardium venenosum (Kosterm. & Pinkley) Rohwer, H.G. Richter & van der Werff

Synonyms
- Ocotea venenosa Kosterm. & Pinkley

= Chlorocardium venenosum =

Species of tree

Chlorocardium venenosum is a species of tree in the family Lauraceae. It is native to Colombia and Ecuador in northwestern South America.
