= Illiciales =

Order of flowering plants

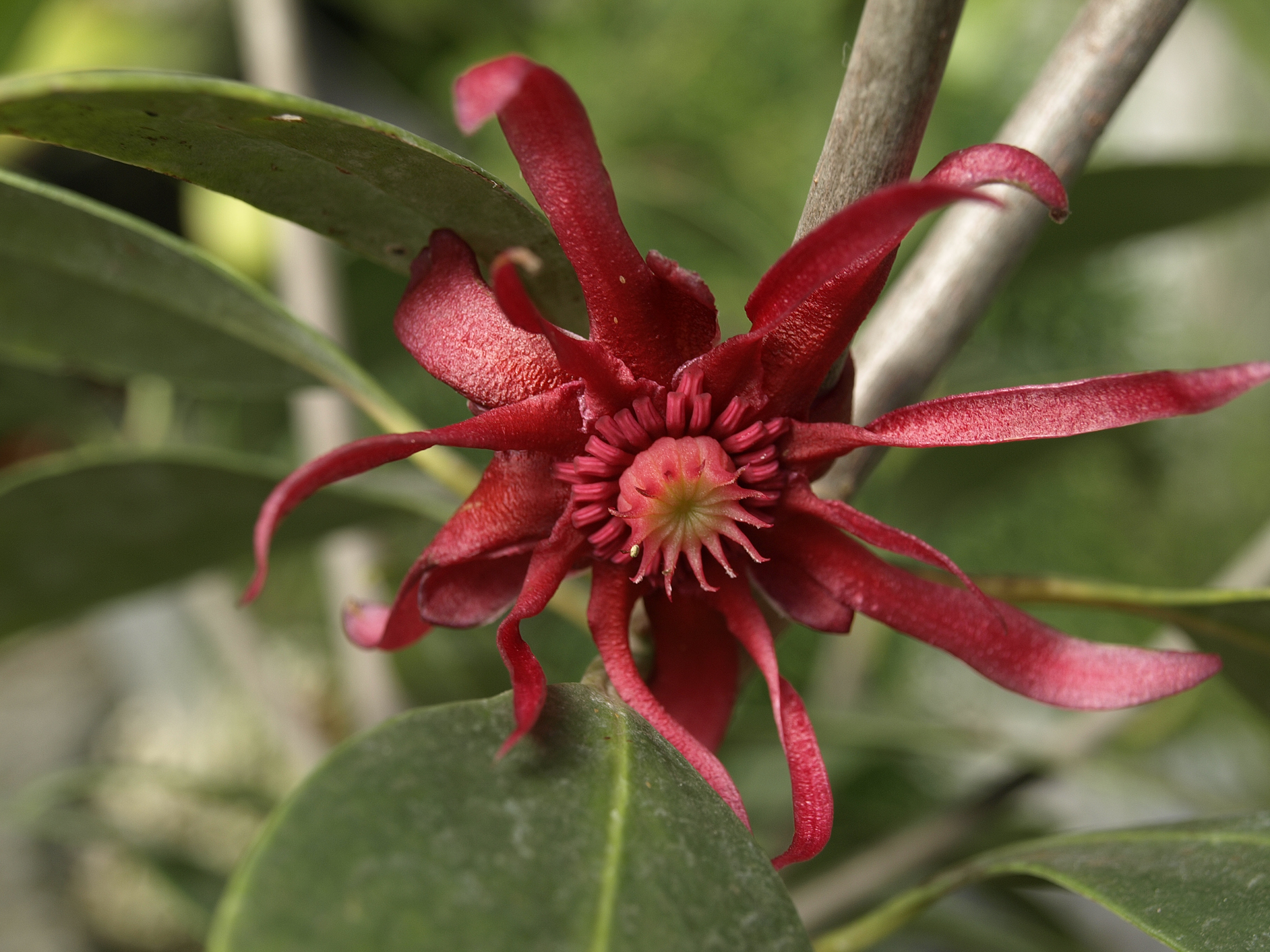
Illicium floridanum

Illiciales is an order of flowering plants that is not recognized by the current most widely used system of plant classification, the Angiosperm Phylogeny Group's APG III system. The order was comprised differently in various systems of plant taxonomy, but is composed of 2-4 families of shrubs, trees, and lianas native to Australasia, south eastern Asia, and the southeastern United States. The families all contain species with essential oils, and flowers with a perianth with bracts (when present), sepals, and petals incompletely distinguished from each other and not arranged in definite whorls. The families of the order had been variably placed in other orders (Magnoliales, Austrobaileyales) in different taxonomies.

The Cronquist system, of 1981, recognized Illiciales as an order consisting of the families Illiciaceae and Schisandraceae and placed it in the subclass Magnoliidae, in class Magnoliopsida (or dicotyledons) of division Magnoliophyta (or angiosperms).

The Dahlgren system also recognised the order and placed it in superorder Magnolianae, in subclass Magnoliideae (Dahlgren's dicotyledons), in class Magnoliopsida with the same circumscription of families as the Chronquist system.

The Angiosperm Phylogeny Group (APG) does not recognize the order, initially leaving the family Illiciaceae unplaced as to order. In its second higher level taxonomy of angiosperms (APG II), the APG recognized Illicium and Schisandra as closely related taxa in the family Illiciaceae, and created the order Austrobaileyales with the families Illiciaceae, Trimeniaceae, and Austrobaileyaceae.
