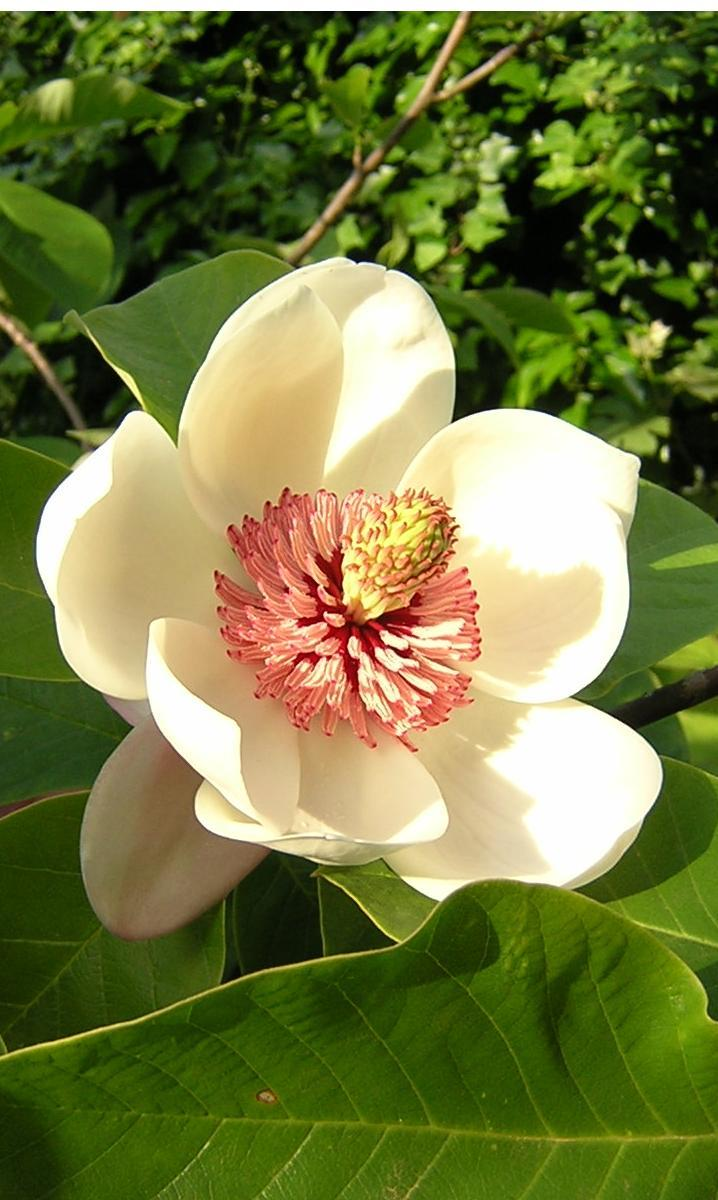
- Flower of Magnolia × wieseneri

Scientific classification
- Kingdom: Plantae
- Clade: Tracheophytes
- Clade: Angiosperms
- Clade: Magnoliids

Orders
- Canellales; Laurales; Magnoliales; Piperales

= Magnoliids =

Magnoliids Temporal range: Aptian–recent

Clade of flowering plants

Magnoliids, Magnoliidae or Magnolianae are a clade of flowering plants. With more than 10,000 species, including magnolias, nutmeg, bay laurel, cinnamon, annonas, avocado, black pepper, tulip tree and many others, it is the third-largest group of angiosperms after the eudicots and monocots. The group is characterized by trimerous flowers, pollen with one pore, and usually branching-veined leaves.

Some members of the subclass are among the earliest angiosperms and share anatomical similarities with gymnosperms like stamens that resemble the male cone scales of conifers and carpels found on the long flowering axis. According to molecular clock calculations, the lineage that led to magnoliids split from other plants about 135 million years ago or 160–165 million years ago.

== Classification ==
"Magnoliidae" is the botanical name of a subclass, and "magnoliids" is an informal name that does not conform to the International Code of Nomenclature for algae, fungi, and plants. The circumscription of a subclass will vary with the taxonomic system being used. The only requirement is that it must include the family Magnoliaceae. The informal name "magnoliids" is used by some researchers to avoid the confusion that recently surrounds the name "Magnoliidae." More recently, the group has been redefined under the PhyloCode as a node-based clade comprising the Canellales, Laurales, Magnoliales, and Piperales. Chase & Reveal have proposed "Magnoliidae" as the name used for the entire group of flowering plants, and the formal name "Magnolianae" for the group of four orders discussed here.

=== APG system ===
The APG III (2009) and its predecessor systems did not originally use formal botanical names above the rank of order. Under those systems, larger clades were usually referred to by informal names, such as "magnoliids" (plural, not capitalized) or "magnoliid complex". The formal name in Linnean nomenclature was specified in a separate APG publication as the existing name "Magnolianae" Takht. (1967). The APG III recognizes a clade within the angiosperms for the magnoliids. The circumscription is:

clade magnoliids

order Canellales
order Laurales
order Magnoliales
order Piperales

- - - Chloranthales
    - - magnoliids
        - - Canellales
          - Piperales
        - - Laurales
          - Magnoliales
  - - monocots
    - - Ceratophyllales
      - eudicots

The current phylogeny and composition of the magnoliids.

The clade includes most of the basal groups of the angiosperms. This clade was formally named Magnoliidae in 2007 under provisions of the PhyloCode.

=== Cronquist system ===
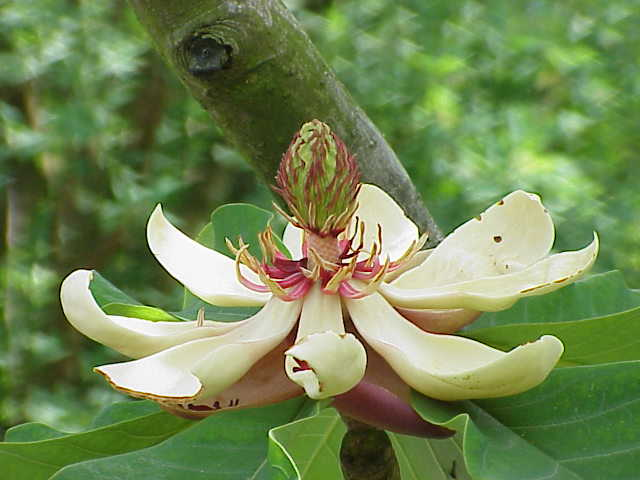
Flower of Magnolia obovata, showing multiple petals, stamens, and pistils.

The Cronquist system (1981) used the name Magnoliidae for one of six subclasses (within class Magnoliopsida = dicotyledons). In the original version of this system the circumscription was:

- Subclass Magnoliidae :
  Order Aristolochiales
  Order Illiciales
  Order Laurales
  Order Magnoliales
  Order Nymphaeales
  Order Papaverales
  Order Piperales
  Order Ranunculales

=== Dahlgren and Thorne systems ===
Both Dahlgren and Thorne classified the magnoliids (sensu APG) in superorder Magnolianae, rather than as a subclass. In their systems, the name Magnoliidae is used for a much larger group including all dicotyledons. This is also the case in some of the systems derived from the Cronquist system.

Dahlgren divided his Magnolianae into ten orders, more than other systems of the time, and unlike Cronquist and Thorne, he did not include the Piperales. Thorne grouped most of his Magnolianae into two large orders, Magnoliales and Berberidales, although his Magnoliales was divided into suborders along lines similar to the ordinal groupings used by both Cronquist and Dahlgren. Thorne revised his system in 2000, restricting the name Magnoliidae to include only the Magnolianae, Nymphaeanae, and Rafflesianae, and removing the Berberidales and other previously included groups to his subclass Ranunculidae. This revised system diverges from the Cronquist system, but agrees more closely with the circumscription later published under APG II.

=== Comparison table ===
Comparison of classification systems is often difficult. Two authors may apply the same name to groups with different composition of members; for example, Dahlgren's Magnoliidae includes all dicots, whereas Cronquists' Magnoliidae is only one of five dicot groups. Two authors may also describe the same group with nearly identical composition, but each may then apply a different name to that group or place the group at a different taxonomic rank. For example, the composition of Cronquist's subclass Magnoliidae is nearly the same as Thorne's (1992) superorder Magnolianae, despite the difference in taxonomic rank.

Because of these difficulties and others, the synoptic table below imprecisely compares the definition of "magnoliid" groups in the systems of four authors. For each system, only orders are named in the table. All orders included by a particular author are listed and linked in that column. When a taxon is not included by that author, but was included by an author in another column, that item appears in unlinked italics and indicates remote placement. The sequence of each system has been altered from its publication in order to pair corresponding taxa between columns.

Comparison of the magnoliids across five systems
APG II system (2003) magnoliids	Cronquist system Magnoliidae	Dahlgren system Magnolianae	Thorne system (1992) Magnolianae	Thorne system (2000) Magnolianae
Laurales	Laurales	Laurales	Magnoliales	Magnoliales
Magnoliales	Magnoliales	Magnoliales	Magnoliales	Magnoliales
Magnoliales	Magnoliales	Annonales	Magnoliales	Magnoliales
Canellales	Magnoliales	Winterales	Magnoliales	Magnoliales
Piperales	Magnoliales	Lactoridales	Magnoliales	Magnoliales
Piperales	Aristolochiales	Aristolochiales	Magnoliales	Magnoliales
Piperales	Piperales	Piperales in Nymphaeanae	Magnoliales	Magnoliales
unplaced or in basal clades	Piperales	Chloranthales	Magnoliales	Magnoliales
unplaced or in basal clades	Illiciales	Illiciales	Magnoliales	Magnoliales
unplaced or in basal clades	in Rosidae	Rafflesiales	in Rafflesianae	in Rafflesianae
unplaced or in basal clades	Nymphaeales	in Nymphaeanae	in Nymphaeanae	in Nymphaeanae
unplaced or in basal clades	Nymphaeales	in Nymphaeanae	Ceratophyllales	in Ranunculidae
placed in eudicot clade	Nymphaeales	Nelumbonales	Nelumbonales	in Ranunculidae
placed in eudicot clade	Ranunculales	in Ranunculanae	Berberidales	in Ranunculidae
placed in eudicot clade	Papaverales	in Ranunculanae	Berberidales	in Ranunculidae
placed in eudicot clade	in Dilleniidae	in Theanae	Paeoniales	in Ranunculidae

== Economic uses ==
The magnoliids is a large group of plants, with many species that are economically important as food, drugs, perfumes, timber, and as ornamentals, among many other uses.

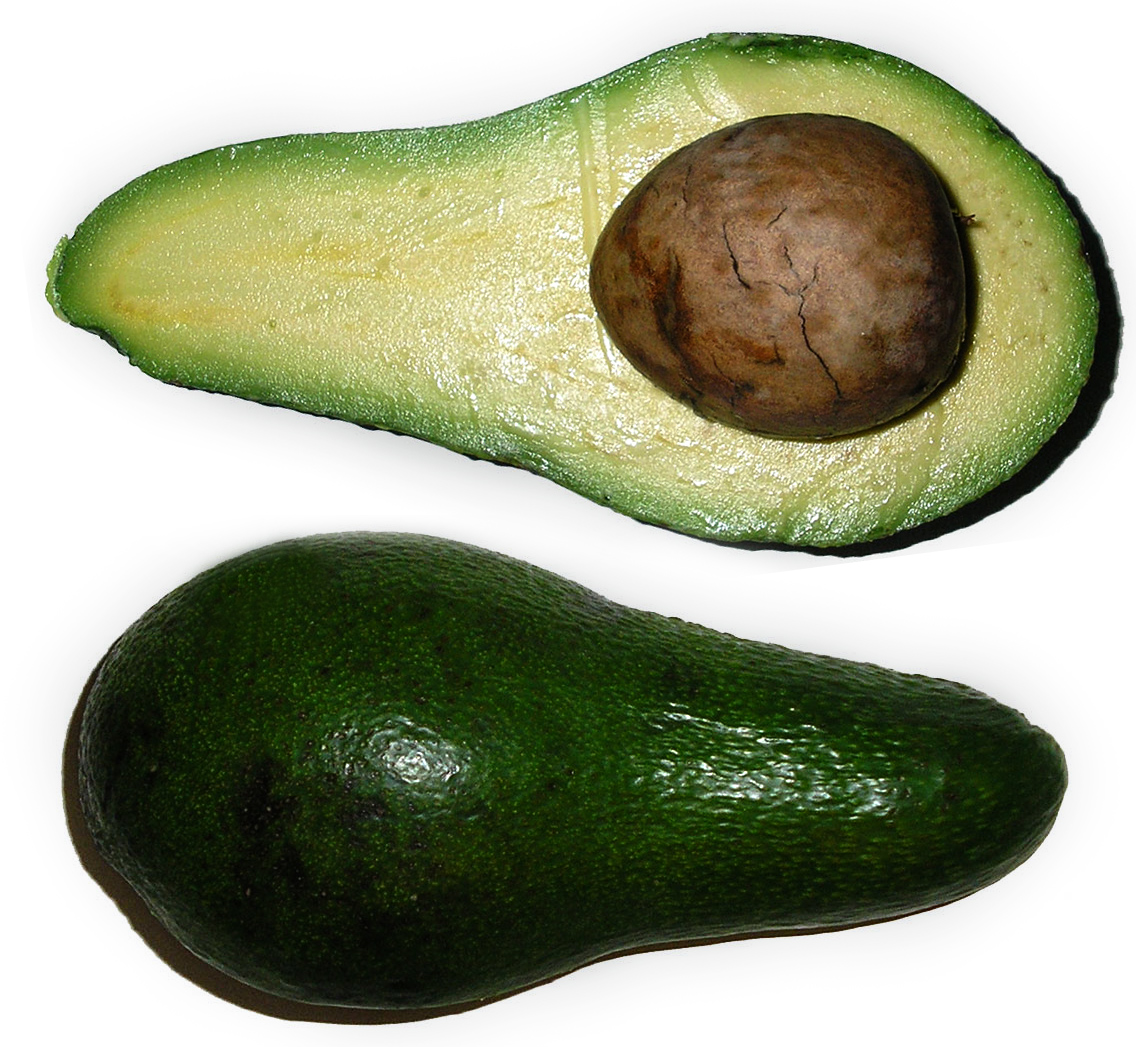
The avocado has been cultivated in the Americas for thousands of years.

One widely cultivated magnoliid fruit is the avocado (Persea americana), which is believed to have been cultivated in Mexico and Central America for nearly 10,000 years. Now grown throughout the tropics, it probably originates from the Chiapas region of Mexico or Guatemala, where "wild" avocados may still be found. The soft pulp of the fruit is eaten fresh or mashed into guacamole. The ancient peoples of Central America were also the first to cultivate several fruit-bearing species of Annona. These include the custard-apple (A. reticulata), soursop (A. muricata), sweetsop or sugar-apple (A. squamosa), and the cherimoya (A. cherimola). Both soursop and sweetsop now are widely grown for their fruits in the Old World as well.

Some members of the magnoliids have served as important food additives, such as black pepper, nutmeg, bay laurel and cinnamon. Oil of sassafras was formerly used as a key flavoring in both root beer and in sarsaparilla. The primary ingredient responsible for the oil's flavor is safrole, but it is no longer used in either the United States or Canada. Both nations banned the use of safrole as a food additive in 1960 as a result of studies that demonstrated safrole promoted liver damage and tumors in mice. Consumption of more than a minute quantity of the oil causes nausea, vomiting, hallucinations, and shallow rapid breathing. It is very toxic, and can severely damage the kidneys. In addition to its former use as a food additive, safrole from either Sassafras or Ocotea cymbarum is also the primary precursor for synthesis of MDMA (methylenedioxymethamphetamine), commonly known as the drug ecstasy.

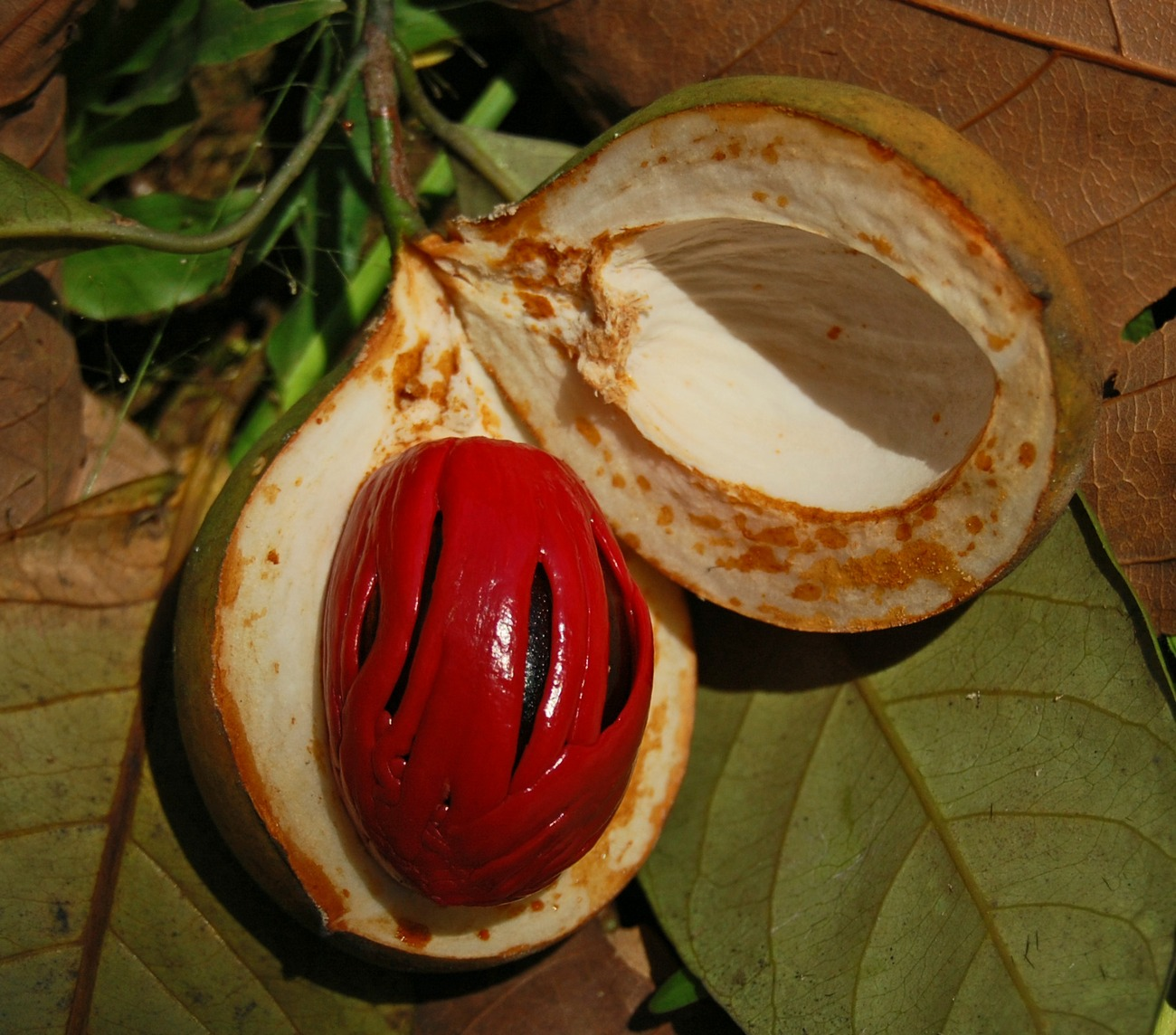
Nutmeg fruits are a source of the hallucinogen myristicin.

Other magnoliids also are known for their narcotic, hallucinogenic, or paralytic properties. The Polynesian beverage kava is prepared from the pulverized roots of Piper methysticum, and has both sedative and narcotic properties. It is used throughout the Pacific in social gatherings or after work to relax. Likewise, some native peoples of the Amazon take a hallucinogenic snuff made from the dried and powdered fluid exuded from the bark of Virola trees. Another hallucinogenic compound, myristicin, comes from the spice nutmeg. As with safrole, ingestion of nutmeg in quantities can lead to hallucinations, nausea, and vomiting, with symptoms lasting several days. A more severe reaction comes from poisoning by rodiasine and demethylrodiasine, the active ingredients in fruit extract from Chlorocardium venenosum. These chemicals paralyze muscles and nerves, resulting in tetanus-like reactions in animals. The Cofán peoples of westernmost Amazon in Colombia and Ecuador use the compound as a poison to tip their arrows in hunting.

Not all the effects of chemical compounds in the magnoliids are detrimental. In previous centuries, sailors would use Winter's Bark from the South American tree Drimys winteri to ward off the vitamin-deficiency of scurvy. Today, benzoyl is extracted from Lindera benzoin (common spicebush) for use as a food additive and skin medicine, due to its anti-bacterial and anti-fungal properties. Drugs extracted from the bark of Magnolia have long been used in traditional Chinese medicine. Scientific investigation of magnolol and honokiol have shown promise for their use in dental health. Both compounds demonstrate effective anti-bacterial activity against the bacteria responsible for bad breath and dental caries. Several members of the family Annonaceae are also under investigation for uses of a group of chemicals called acetogenins. The first acetogenin discovered was uvaricin, which has anti-leukemic properties when used in living organisms. Other acetogenins have been discovered with anti-malarial and anti-tumor properties, and some even inhibit HIV replication in laboratory studies.

Many magnoliid species produce essential oils in their leaves, bark, or wood. The tree Virola surinamensis (Brazilian "nutmeg") contains trimyristin, which is extracted in the form of a fat and used in soaps and candles, as well as in shortenings. Other fragrant volatile oils are extracted from Aniba rosaeodora (bois-de-rose oil), Cinnamomum porrectum, Cinnamomum cassia, and Litsea odorifera for scenting soaps. Perfumes also are made from some of these oils; ylang-ylang comes from the flowers of Cananga odorata, and is used by Arab and Swahili women. A compound called nutmeg butter is produced from the same tree as the spice of that name, but the sweet-smelling "butter" is used in perfumery or as a lubricant rather than as a food.

== See also ==
- Eudicots
- Monocotyledon
