= Cycleanine =

Names
- Other names Dimethylisochondodendrine

Identifiers
CAS Number	518-94-5
3D model (JSmol)	Interactive image
ChemSpider	108295
PubChem CID	121313
UNII	BN8R5T4KQ9
CompTox Dashboard (EPA)	DTXSID40199740
- InChI: InChI=1S/C38H42N2O6/c1-39-17-15-25-21-31(41-3)35(43-5)37-33(25)29(39)19-23-7-11-28(12-8-23)46-38-34-26(22-32(42-4)36(38)44-6)16-18-40(2)30(34)20-24-9-13-27(45-37)14-10-24/h7-14,21-22,29-30H,15-20H2,1-6H3/t29-,30-/m1/s1 Key: ANOXEUSGZWSCQL-LOYHVIPDSA-N; InChI=1/C38H42N2O6/c1-39-17-15-25-21-31(41-3)35(43-5)37-33(25)29(39)19-23-7-11-28(12-8-23)46-38-34-26(22-32(42-4)36(38)44-6)16-18-40(2)30(34)20-24-9-13-27(45-37)14-10-24/h7-14,21-22,29-30H,15-20H2,1-6H3/t29-,30-/m1/s1 Key: ANOXEUSGZWSCQL-LOYHVIPDBP
- SMILES: CN1CCc2cc(c(c3c2[C@H]1Cc4ccc(cc4)Oc5c6c(cc(c5OC)OC)CCN([C@@H]6Cc7ccc(cc7)O3)C)OC)OC

Properties
Chemical formula	C_{38}H_{42}N_{2}O_{6}
Molar mass	622.762 g·mol^{−1}
- Except where otherwise noted, data are given for materials in their standard state (at 25 °C [77 °F], 100 kPa). Infobox references

Cycleanine is a selective vascular calcium antagonist isolated from Stephania.
