= Rodiasine =

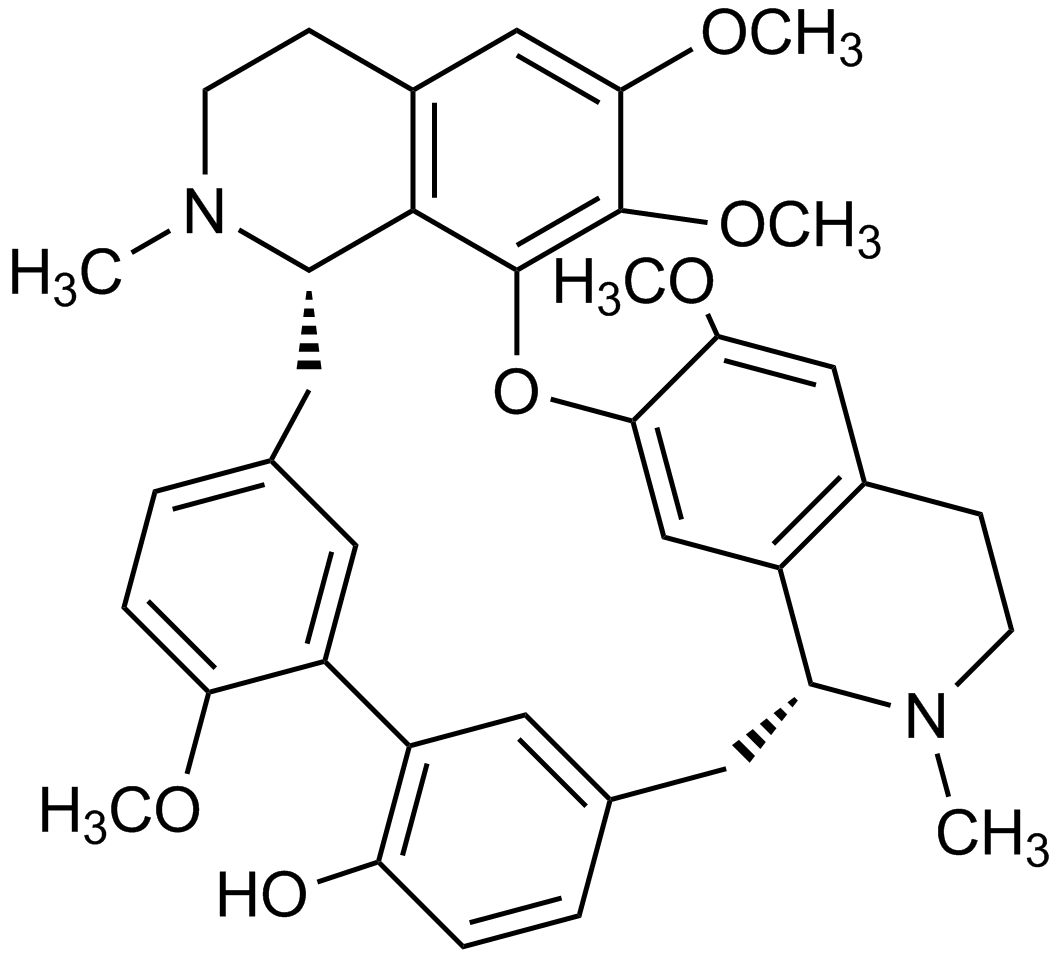

Identifiers
CAS Number	6391-64-6
3D model (JSmol)	Interactive image
ChEBI	CHEBI:8886
ChEMBL	ChEMBL1170881
ChemSpider	390797
PubChem CID	442345
CompTox Dashboard (EPA)	DTXSID20331803
- InChI: InChI=1S/C38H42N2O6/c1-39-13-11-24-19-33(43-4)34-21-26(24)29(39)17-22-7-9-31(41)27(15-22)28-16-23(8-10-32(28)42-3)18-30-36-25(12-14-40(30)2)20-35(44-5)37(45-6)38(36)46-34/h7-10,15-16,19-21,29-30,41H,11-14,17-18H2,1-6H3/t29-,30+/m1/s1 Key: HIQZXOFBXJICTD-IHLOFXLRSA-N; InChI=1/C38H42N2O6/c1-39-13-11-24-19-33(43-4)34-21-26(24)29(39)17-22-7-9-31(41)27(15-22)28-16-23(8-10-32(28)42-3)18-30-36-25(12-14-40(30)2)20-35(44-5)37(45-6)38(36)46-34/h7-10,15-16,19-21,29-30,41H,11-14,17-18H2,1-6H3/t29-,30+/m1/s1 Key: HIQZXOFBXJICTD-IHLOFXLRBV
- SMILES: O(c1ccc5cc1c2c(O)ccc(c2)C[C@H]7N(CCc6cc(OC)c(Oc3c4c(cc(OC)c3OC)CCN(C)[C@H]4C5)cc67)C)C

Properties
Chemical formula	C_{38}H_{42}N_{2}O_{6}
Molar mass	622.75 g/mol
- Except where otherwise noted, data are given for materials in their standard state (at 25 °C [77 °F], 100 kPa). verify (what is ?) Infobox references

Rodiasine is a cyclic bisbenzylisoquinoline alkaloid that was first isolated from the South American greenheart tree Chlorocardium rodiei. The synthesis of O-demethylrodiasine (antioquine) and its derivatives, and the possible application of these compounds as anti-cancer, calcium channel blockers, and anti-parasitic drugs has been described.
