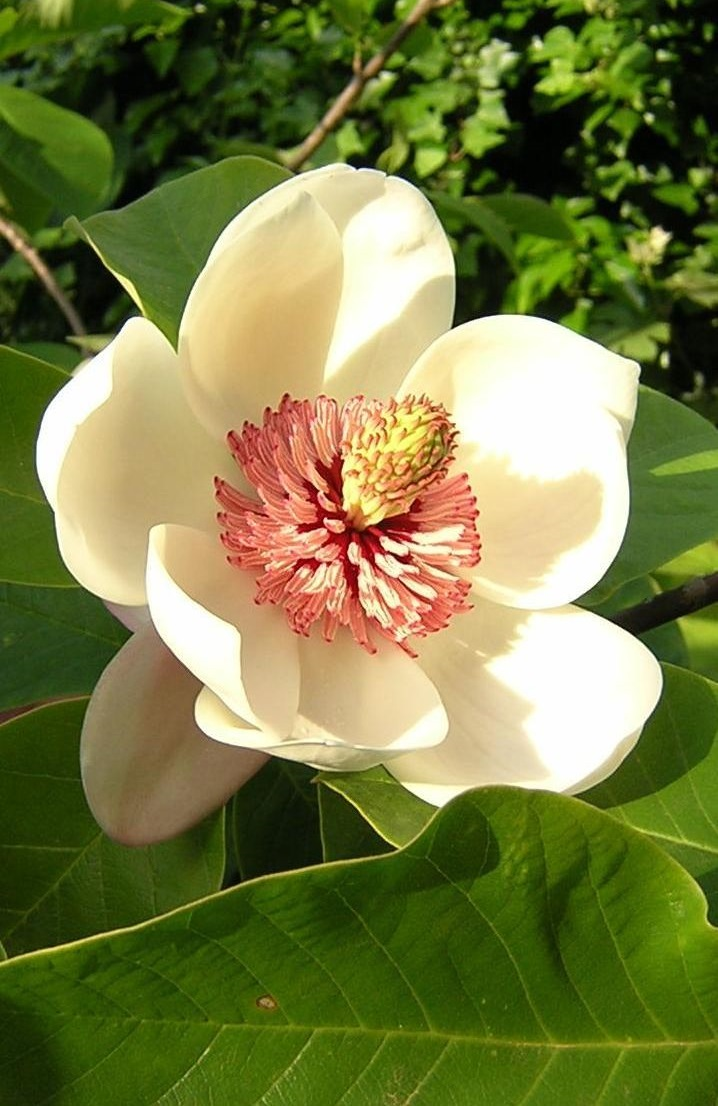

Scientific classification
- Kingdom: Plantae
- Clade: Tracheophytes
- Clade: Angiosperms
- Clade: Magnoliids
- Order: Magnoliales
- Family: Magnoliaceae
- Genus: Magnolia
- Species: M. × wieseneri

Binomial name
- Magnolia × wieseneri Carrière

Synonyms
- Magnolia × watsonii Hook.f.

= Magnolia × wieseneri =

Hybrid species of tree

Magnolia × wieseneri, or Wiesener's magnolia also known as Watson's magnolia, is a hybrid plant in the genus Magnolia and family Magnoliaceae. A small tree or large shrub with white highly fragrant blooms, it is the progeny of Magnolia sieboldii and Magnolia obovata.

== Hybrid ==
The origins of Magnolia × wieseneri are obscure, but it is thought to have been a result of deliberate cross-breeding between the parent species some time in the 19th century or earlier in Japan, where it is known as Gyo Kusui or Ukesaki Oyama-renage. It entered European horticulture at the 1889 Paris Exposition, where it was on display at the Japanese Court stand. From here, it was collected for Kew Gardens, and named Magnolia × watsonii by Joseph Hooker in 1891. However, Élie-Abel Carrière had named a specimen six months earlier in 1890 after a Mr Wiesener, who had purchased a plant from a Japanese horticulturist at the Trocadéro at the same time as the Exposition, and hence the French botanist's name was preserved under International Code of Botanical Nomenclature naming rules.

== Description ==
Magnolia × wieseneri is a multistemmed large shrub or small tree which may reach 6 m (20 ft) in height; it has leathery obovate green leaves that reach 20 cm (8 in) long by 10.5 cm (4 in) wide. Its most notable feature is the remarkable fragrance of the ivory-coloured flowers, which has been likened to pineapples and seen adjectives such as "ethereal", "spicy" and "aromatic" used. The flowers are cup-shaped at first, with a diameter of 10-12.5 cm (4–5 in), before flattening out to a diameter of 15–20 cm (6–8 in) after a few days.

== Cultivation ==
A chance seedling, from the garden of Sir Peter Smithers at Vico Morcote in Switzerland, with more vigorous growth and larger flowers has been described as Magnolia "William Watson". The garden owner Smithers observed that there were specimens of M. obovata flowering nearby and that the cultivar is possibly a backcross with obovata.
