= APG system =

System of plant taxonomy

The APG system (Angiosperm Phylogeny Group system) of plant classification is the first version of a modern, mostly molecular-based, system of plant taxonomy. Published in 1998 by the Angiosperm Phylogeny Group, it was replaced by the improved APG II in 2003, APG III system in 2009, APG IV system in 2016, and APG V system in 2026 (published in the Journal of Systematics and Evolution).

== History ==
The original APG system is unusual in being based, not on total evidence, but on the cladistic analysis of the DNA sequences of three genes, two chloroplast genes and one gene coding for ribosomes. Although based on molecular evidence only, its constituent groups prove to be supported by other evidence as well, for example pollen morphology supports the split between the eudicots and the rest of the former dicotyledons.

The system is rather controversial in its decisions at the family level, splitting a number of long-established families and submerging some other families. It also is unusual in not using botanical names above the level of order, that is, an order is the highest rank that will have a formal botanical name in this system. Higher groups are defined only as clades, with names such as monocots, eudicots, rosids, asterids.

The APG system was superseded in 2003 by a revision, the APG II system, in 2009 by a next revision, the APG III system, and then in 2016 by a further revision, the APG IV system.

== Groups ==
The main groups in the system (all unranked clades) are:

- angiosperms :
  monocots
  commelinoids
  eudicots
  core eudicots
  rosids
  eurosids I
  eurosids II
  asterids
  euasterids I
  euasterids II

The APG system recognises 462 families and 40 orders: these are assigned as follows. In the beginning of each listing some families or orders that are not placed in a further clade:

- clade angiosperms
  family Amborellaceae
  family Austrobaileyaceae
  family Canellaceae
  family Chloranthaceae
  family Hydnoraceae
  family Illiciaceae
  family Nymphaeaceae [+ family Cabombaceae]
  family Rafflesiaceae
  family Schisandraceae
  family Trimeniaceae
  family Winteraceae
  order Ceratophyllales
  family Ceratophyllaceae
  order Laurales
  family Atherospermataceae
  family Calycanthaceae
  family Gomortegaceae
  family Hernandiaceae
  family Lauraceae
  family Monimiaceae
  family Siparunaceae
  order Magnoliales
  family Annonaceae
  family Degeneriaceae
  family Eupomatiaceae
  family Himantandraceae
  family Magnoliaceae
  family Myristicaceae
  order Piperales
  family Aristolochiaceae
  family Lactoridaceae
  family Piperaceae
  family Saururaceae
  clade monocots
  family Corsiaceae
  family Japonoliriaceae
  family Nartheciaceae
  family Petrosaviaceae
  family Triuridaceae
  order Acorales
  family Acoraceae
  order Alismatales
  family Alismataceae
  family Aponogetonaceae
  family Araceae
  family Butomaceae
  family Cymodoceaceae
  family Hydrocharitaceae
  family Juncaginaceae
  family Limnocharitaceae
  family Posidoniaceae
  family Potamogetonaceae
  family Ruppiaceae
  family Scheuchzeriaceae
  family Tofieldiaceae
  family Zosteraceae
  order Asparagales
  family Agapanthaceae
  family Agavaceae
  family Alliaceae
  family Amaryllidaceae
  family Anemarrhenaceae
  family Anthericaceae
  family Aphyllanthaceae
  family Asparagaceae
  family Asphodelaceae
  family Asteliaceae
  family Behniaceae
  family Blandfordiaceae
  family Boryaceae
  family Convallariaceae
  family Doryanthaceae
  family Hemerocallidaceae
  family Herreriaceae
  family Hesperocallidaceae
  family Hyacinthaceae
  family Hypoxidaceae
  family Iridaceae
  family Ixioliriaceae
  family Lanariaceae
  family Laxmanniaceae
  family Orchidaceae
  family Tecophilaeaceae
  family Themidaceae
  family Xanthorrhoeaceae
  family Xeronemataceae
  order Dioscoreales
  family Burmanniaceae
  family Dioscoreaceae
  family Taccaceae
  family Thismiaceae
  family Trichopodaceae
  order Liliales
  family Alstroemeriaceae
  family Campynemataceae
  family Colchicaceae
  family Liliaceae
  family Luzuriagaceae
  family Melanthiaceae
  family Philesiaceae
  family Ripogonaceae
  family Smilacaceae
  order Pandanales
  family Cyclanthaceae
  family Pandanaceae
  family Stemonaceae
  family Velloziaceae
  clade commelinoids
  family Abolbodaceae
  family Bromeliaceae
  family Dasypogonaceae
  family Hanguanaceae
  family Mayacaceae
  family Rapateaceae
  order Arecales
  family Arecaceae
  order Commelinales
  family Commelinaceae
  family Haemodoraceae
  family Philydraceae
  family Pontederiaceae
  order Poales
  family Anarthriaceae
  family Centrolepidaceae
  family Cyperaceae
  family Ecdeiocoleaceae
  family Eriocaulaceae
  family Flagellariaceae
  family Hydatellaceae
  family Joinvilleaceae
  family Juncaceae
  family Poaceae
  family Prioniaceae
  family Restionaceae
  family Sparganiaceae
  family Thurniaceae
  family Typhaceae
  family Xyridaceae
  order Zingiberales
  family Cannaceae
  family Costaceae
  family Heliconiaceae
  family Lowiaceae
  family Marantaceae
  family Musaceae
  family Strelitziaceae
  family Zingiberaceae
  clade eudicots
  family Buxaceae
  family Didymelaceae
  family Sabiaceae
  family Trochodendraceae [+ family Tetracentraceae]
  order Proteales
  family Nelumbonaceae
  family Platanaceae
  family Proteaceae
  order Ranunculales
  family Berberidaceae
  family Circaeasteraceae [+ family Kingdoniaceae]
  family Eupteleaceae
  family Lardizabalaceae
  family Menispermaceae
  family Papaveraceae [+ family Fumariaceae and family Pteridophyllaceae]
  family Ranunculaceae
  clade core eudicots
  family Aextoxicaceae
  family Berberidopsidaceae
  family Dilleniaceae
  family Gunneraceae
  family Myrothamnaceae
  family Vitaceae
  order Caryophyllales
  family Achatocarpaceae
  family Aizoaceae
  family Amaranthaceae
  family Ancistrocladaceae
  family Asteropeiaceae
  family Basellaceae
  family Cactaceae
  family Caryophyllaceae
  family Didiereaceae
  family Dioncophyllaceae
  family Droseraceae
  family Drosophyllaceae
  family Frankeniaceae
  family Molluginaceae
  family Nepenthaceae
  family Nyctaginaceae
  family Physenaceae
  family Phytolaccaceae
  family Plumbaginaceae
  family Polygonaceae
  family Portulacaceae
  family Rhabdodendraceae
  family Sarcobataceae
  family Simmondsiaceae
  family Stegnospermataceae
  family Tamaricaceae
  order Santalales
  family Olacaceae
  family Opiliaceae
  family Loranthaceae
  family Misodendraceae
  family Santalaceae
  order Saxifragales
  family Altingiaceae
  family Cercidiphyllaceae
  family Crassulaceae
  family Daphniphyllaceae
  family Grossulariaceae
  family Haloragaceae
  family Hamamelidaceae
  family Iteaceae
  family Paeoniaceae
  family Penthoraceae
  family Pterostemonaceae
  family Saxifragaceae
  family Tetracarpaeaceae
  clade rosids
  family Aphloiaceae
  family Crossosomataceae
  family Ixerbaceae
  family Krameriaceae
  family Picramniaceae
  family Podostemaceae
  family Stachyuraceae
  family Staphyleaceae
  family Tristichaceae
  family Zygophyllaceae
  order Geraniales
  family Francoaceae
  family Geraniaceae [+ family Hypseocharitaceae]
  family Greyiaceae
  family Ledocarpaceae
  family Melianthaceae
  family Vivianiaceae
  clade eurosids I
  family Celastraceae
  family Huaceae
  family Parnassiaceae [+ family Lepuropetalaceae]
  family Stackhousiaceae
  order Cucurbitales
  family Anisophylleaceae
  family Begoniaceae
  family Coriariaceae
  family Corynocarpaceae
  family Cucurbitaceae
  family Datiscaceae
  family Tetramelaceae
  order Fabales
  family Fabaceae
  family Polygalaceae
  family Quillajaceae
  family Surianaceae
  order Fagales
  family Betulaceae
  family Casuarinaceae
  family Fagaceae
  family Juglandaceae
  family Myricaceae
  family Nothofagaceae
  family Rhoipteleaceae
  family Ticodendraceae
  order Malpighiales
  family Achariaceae
  family Balanopaceae
  family Caryocaraceae
  family Chrysobalanaceae
  family Clusiaceae
  family Dichapetalaceae
  family Erythroxylaceae
  family Euphorbiaceae
  family Euphroniaceae
  family Flacourtiaceae
  family Goupiaceae
  family Hugoniaceae
  family Humiriaceae
  family Irvingiaceae
  family Ixonanthaceae
  family Lacistemaceae
  family Linaceae
  family Malesherbiaceae
  family Malpighiaceae
  family Medusagynaceae
  family Ochnaceae
  family Pandaceae
  family Passifloraceae
  family Putranjivaceae
  family Quiinaceae
  family Rhizophoraceae
  family Salicaceae
  family Scyphostegiaceae
  family Trigoniaceae
  family Turneraceae
  family Violaceae
  order Oxalidales
  family Cephalotaceae
  family Connaraceae
  family Cunoniaceae
  family Elaeocarpaceae
  family Oxalidaceae
  family Tremandraceae
  order Rosales
  family Barbeyaceae
  family Cannabaceae
  family Cecropiaceae
  family Celtidaceae
  family Dirachmaceae
  family Elaeagnaceae
  family Moraceae
  family Rhamnaceae
  family Rosaceae
  family Ulmaceae
  family Urticaceae
  clade eurosids II
  family Tapisciaceae
  order Brassicales
  family Akaniaceae [+ family Bretschneideraceae]
  family Bataceae
  family Brassicaceae
  family Caricaceae
  family Emblingiaceae
  family Gyrostemonaceae
  family Koeberliniaceae
  family Limnanthaceae
  family Moringaceae
  family Pentadiplandraceae
  family Resedaceae
  family Salvadoraceae
  family Setchellanthaceae
  family Tovariaceae
  family Tropaeolaceae
  order Malvales
  family Bixaceae [+ family Diegodendraceae]
  family Cistaceae
  family Cochlospermaceae
  family Dipterocarpaceae
  family Malvaceae
  family Muntingiaceae
  family Neuradaceae
  family Sarcolaenaceae
  family Sphaerosepalaceae
  family Thymelaeaceae
  order Myrtales
  family Alzateaceae
  family Combretaceae
  family Crypteroniaceae
  family Heteropyxidaceae
  family Lythraceae
  family Melastomataceae
  family Memecylaceae
  family Myrtaceae
  family Oliniaceae
  family Onagraceae
  family Penaeaceae
  family Psiloxylaceae
  family Rhynchocalycaceae
  family Vochysiaceae
  order Sapindales
  family Anacardiaceae
  family Biebersteiniaceae
  family Burseraceae
  family Kirkiaceae
  family Meliaceae
  family Nitrariaceae [+ family Peganaceae]
  family Rutaceae
  family Sapindaceae
  family Simaroubaceae
  clade asterids
  order Cornales
  family Cornaceae [+ family Nyssaceae]
  family Grubbiaceae
  family Hydrangeaceae
  family Hydrostachyaceae
  family Loasaceae
  order Ericales
  family Actinidiaceae
  family Balsaminaceae
  family Clethraceae
  family Cyrillaceae
  family Diapensiaceae
  family Ebenaceae
  family Ericaceae
  family Fouquieriaceae
  family Halesiaceae
  family Lecythidaceae
  family Marcgraviaceae
  family Myrsinaceae
  family Pellicieraceae
  family Polemoniaceae
  family Primulaceae
  family Roridulaceae
  family Sapotaceae
  family Sarraceniaceae
  family Styracaceae
  family Symplocaceae
  family Ternstroemiaceae
  family Tetrameristaceae
  family Theaceae
  family Theophrastaceae
  clade euasterids I
  family Boraginaceae
  family Plocospermataceae
  family Vahliaceae
  order Garryales
  family Aucubaceae
  family Eucommiaceae
  family Garryaceae
  family Oncothecaceae
  order Gentianales
  family Apocynaceae
  family Gelsemiaceae
  family Gentianaceae
  family Loganiaceae
  family Rubiaceae
  order Lamiales
  family Acanthaceae
  family Avicenniaceae
  family Bignoniaceae
  family Buddlejaceae
  family Byblidaceae
  family Cyclocheilaceae
  family Gesneriaceae
  family Lamiaceae
  family Lentibulariaceae
  family Myoporaceae
  family Oleaceae
  family Orobanchaceae
  family Paulowniaceae
  family Pedaliaceae [+ family Martyniaceae]
  family Phrymaceae
  family Plantaginaceae
  family Schlegeliaceae
  family Scrophulariaceae
  family Stilbaceae
  family Tetrachondraceae
  family Verbenaceae
  order Solanales
  family Convolvulaceae
  family Hydroleaceae
  family Montiniaceae
  family Solanaceae
  family Sphenocleaceae
  clade euasterids II
  family Adoxaceae
  family Bruniaceae
  family Carlemanniaceae
  family Columelliaceae [+ family Desfontainiaceae]
  family Eremosynaceae
  family Escalloniaceae
  family Icacinaceae
  family Polyosmaceae
  family Sphenostemonaceae
  family Tribelaceae
  order Apiales
  family Apiaceae
  family Araliaceae
  family Aralidiaceae
  family Griseliniaceae
  family Melanophyllaceae
  family Pittosporaceae
  family Torricelliaceae
  order Aquifoliales
  family Aquifoliaceae
  family Helwingiaceae
  family Phyllonomaceae
  order Asterales
  family Alseuosmiaceae
  family Argophyllaceae
  family Asteraceae
  family Calyceraceae
  family Campanulaceae [+ family Lobeliaceae]
  family Carpodetaceae
  family Donatiaceae
  family Goodeniaceae
  family Menyanthaceae
  family Pentaphragmataceae
  family Phellinaceae
  family Rousseaceae
  family Stylidiaceae
  order Dipsacales
  family Caprifoliaceae
  family Diervillaceae
  family Dipsacaceae
  family Linnaeaceae
  family Morinaceae
  family Valerianaceae

Note: "+ ..." = optional seggregrate family, that may be split off from the preceding family.

- Families of uncertain position
  family Balanophoraceae
  family Bonnetiaceae
  family Cardiopteridaceae
  family Ctenolophonaceae
  family Cynomoriaceae
  family Cytinaceae
  family Dipentodontaceae
  family Elatinaceae
  family Geissolomataceae
  family Hoplestigmataceae
  family Kaliphoraceae
  family Lepidobotryaceae
  family Lissocarpaceae
  family Lophopyxidaceae
  family Medusandraceae
  family Metteniusaceae
  family Mitrastemonaceae
  family Paracryphiaceae
  family Pentaphylacaceae
  family Peridiscaceae
  family Plagiopteraceae
  family Pottingeriaceae
  family Sladeniaceae
  family Strasburgeriaceae
  family Tepuianthaceae

== See also ==
- APG II system
- APG III system
- APG IV system
