= Buddleja vexans =

Scientific classification
- Kingdom: Plantae
- Clade: Embryophytes
- Clade: Tracheophytes
- Clade: Spermatophytes
- Clade: Angiosperms
- Clade: Eudicots
- Clade: Asterids
- Order: Lamiales
- Family: Scrophulariaceae
- Genus: Buddleja
- Species: B. vexans

Binomial name
- Buddleja vexans Kraenzl. & Loes. ex E. M Norman

Species of plant

Buddleja vexans is a recently (2000) recognized species endemic to central Peru, growing along streams, roads and cliffs at altitudes of 3,300 – 3,900 m. Norman adjudged the plant to be a probable hybrid between B. coriacea and B. incana.

== Description ==
Buddleja vexans is a sterile shrub 3 – 5 m high with a trunk < 30 cm in diameter, the bark brown and fissured. The younger branches are terete and tomentose, bearing coriaceous elliptic leaves 4.5 – 8 cm long by 1 – 3 cm wide, glabrous and rugose above, densely tomentose below. The fragrant golden-orange paniculate leafy-bracted inflorescences are 5 – 12 cm long by 5 – 9 cm wide, comprising 1 – 2 orders of branches bearing heads 1.5 – 2 cm in diameter, each with 16 – 20 flowers, the corollas 4 – 5 mm long.

A popular garden plant in Peru, Norman considers B. vexans to have the greatest horticultural merit of all the American buddlejas.

== Cultivation ==
The shrub is not known to be in cultivation beyond Peru.
