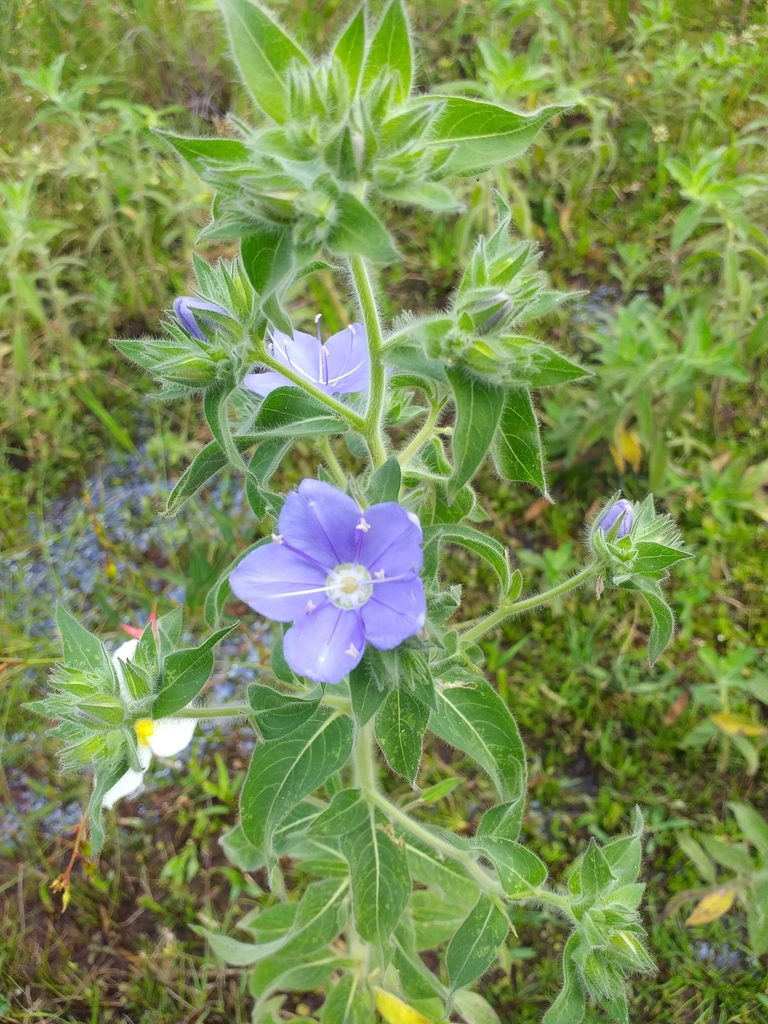

Scientific classification
- Kingdom: Plantae
- Clade: Tracheophytes
- Clade: Angiosperms
- Clade: Eudicots
- Clade: Asterids
- Order: Solanales
- Family: Hydroleaceae
- Genus: Hydrolea
- Species: H. elatior

Binomial name
- Hydrolea elatior Schott

= Hydrolea elatior =

Hydrolea Species

Hydrolea elatior is a species of flowering plant belonging to the family Hydroleaceae. It is native to Central and South America.

Its stems grow up to 0.6m with its leaves being shaped of ovate to lanceolate, growing up to 11 cm long and 2 cm wide.
