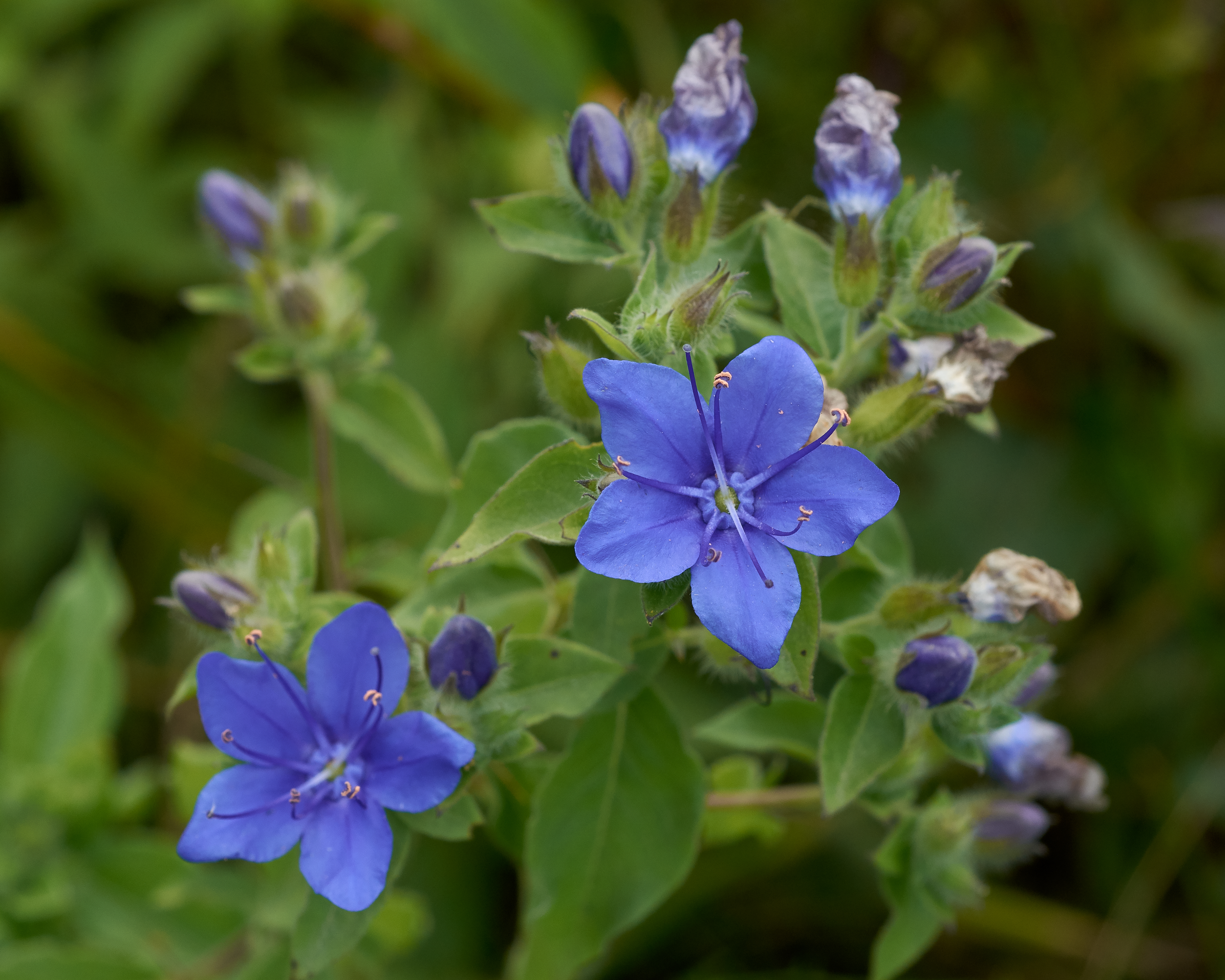

Conservation status
- Secure (NatureServe)

Scientific classification
- Kingdom: Plantae
- Clade: Tracheophytes
- Clade: Angiosperms
- Clade: Eudicots
- Clade: Asterids
- Order: Solanales
- Family: Hydroleaceae
- Genus: Hydrolea
- Species: H. ovata

Binomial name
- Hydrolea ovata Nutt. ex Choisy

= Hydrolea ovata =

Species of flowering plant

Hydrolea ovata is a species of flowering plant known by the common names ovate false fiddleleaf and blue waterleaf. It is native to the southeastern United States.

This rhizomatous perennial herb has spiny stems that grow up to 2 feet tall. The spiny, alternately arranged leaves are oval in shape. The flowers are blue.

This is a wetland species. It grows near ponds, ditches, and other wet sites and is used in wetland restoration projects.

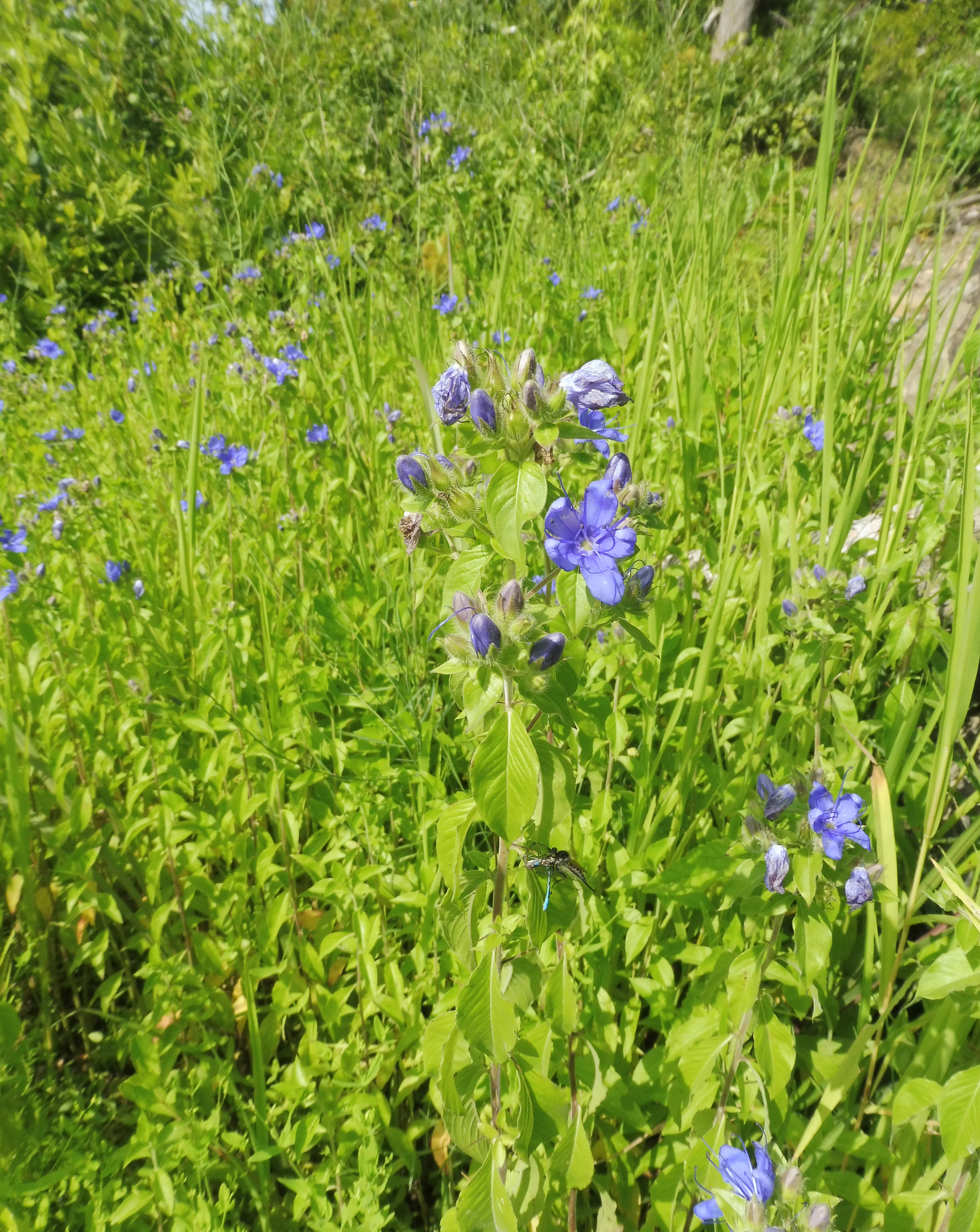
A colony of Hydrolea ovata
