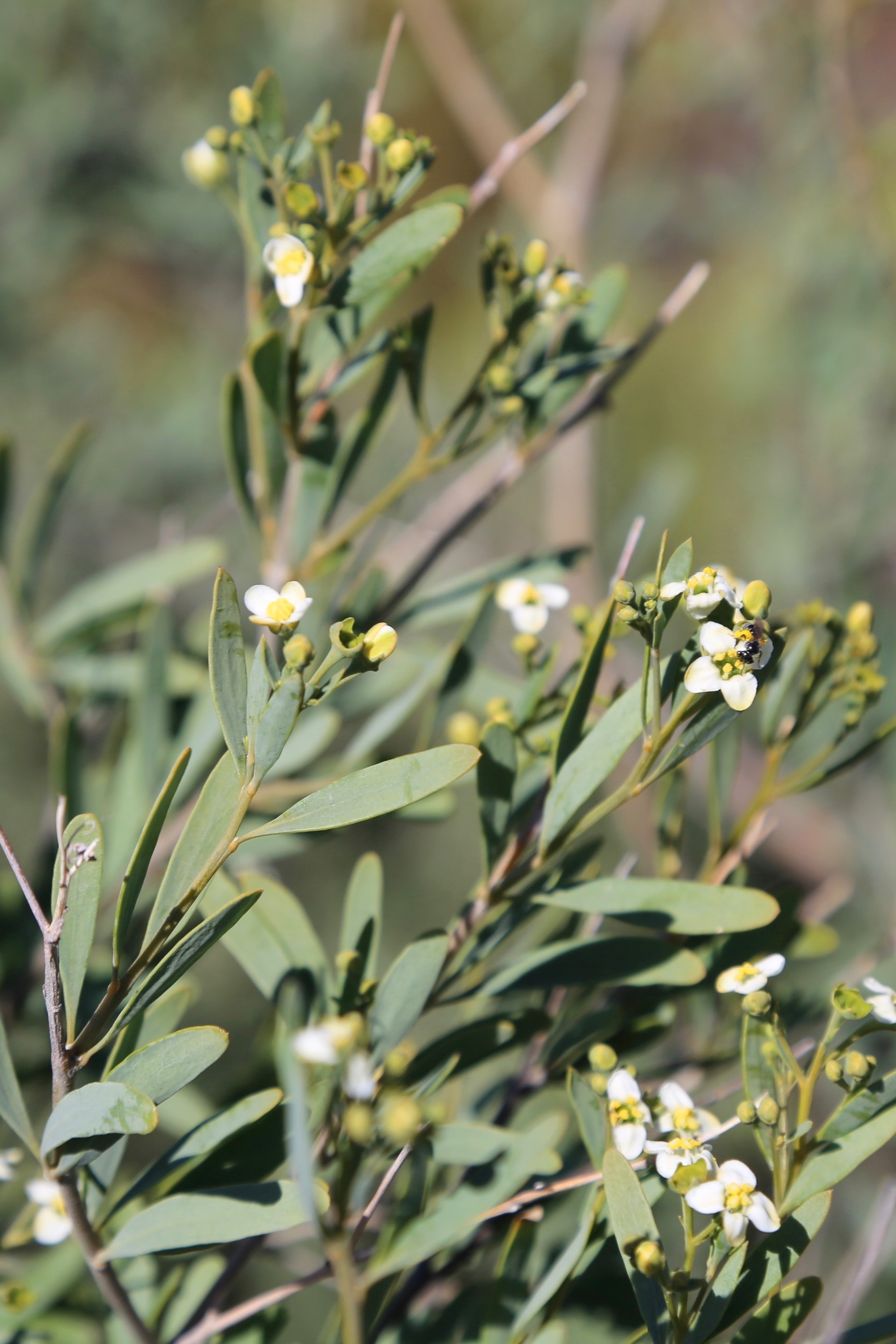
- Montinia caryophyllacea, Western Cape, South Africa

Conservation status
- Least Concern (SANBI Red List)

Scientific classification
- Kingdom: Plantae
- Clade: Tracheophytes
- Clade: Angiosperms
- Clade: Eudicots
- Clade: Asterids
- Order: Solanales
- Family: Montiniaceae
- Genus: Montinia; Thunb.
- Species: M. caryophyllacea

Binomial name
- Montinia caryophyllacea Thunb.

Synonyms
- Montinia acris L.f.; Montinia fruticosa Gaertn.

= Montinia =

Genus of plants

Montinia is a monotypic genus of flowering plants belonging to the family Montiniaceae. It only contains one known species, Montinia caryophyllacea Thunb.

Its native range is Southern Africa. It is found in Angola, Botswana, the Cape Provinces (of South Africa) and Namibia. It grows on dry, rocky, sandstone or granite slopes.

== Description ==
It is an upright, greyish, dioecious shrublet. It has male and female flowers on separate plants. It grows up to 1.5 m (4 ft 11 in) tall. It has leathery, elliptical shaped and sometimes tufted leaves. They are 15–70 mm (1–3 in) long, pale green, smooth and have a dull, waxy coating. It blossoms between May and October and bears small waxy, white flowers, either in loose clusters on the male plants or 1 or 2 flowers on the females plants. The flowers have 4 petals. After flowering, the plant produces an ovoid shaped, seed capsule or 'fruit', which is often dry and brown, and shuttle-shaped. It is 15–20 mm (1–1 in) long. The husk splits into 2 halves to release the seeds. Small flatten discs with membranous wings.

== Taxonomy ==
It has several Afrikaans common names: such as Bergklapper, Bergklapperbos, Bergklapperbossie, Donkiebos, Klokkiesbos, Peperbos, Peperbossie, Perdebos, Wildenaeltjiebos and T'iena. It also has a couple of English common names, Wild clove-bush and Pepperbush.

The genus name of Montinia is in honour of Lars Jonasson Montin (1723–1785), a Swedish botanist and doctor in Lund and Halland. He had maintained a large herbarium and was a student of Carl Linnaeus. The Latin specific epithet of caryophyllacea refers to karyophyllon, the Greek word for Clove. It was first described and published in Physiogr. Sälsk. Handl. Vol.1 on pages 108–109 in 1776.
