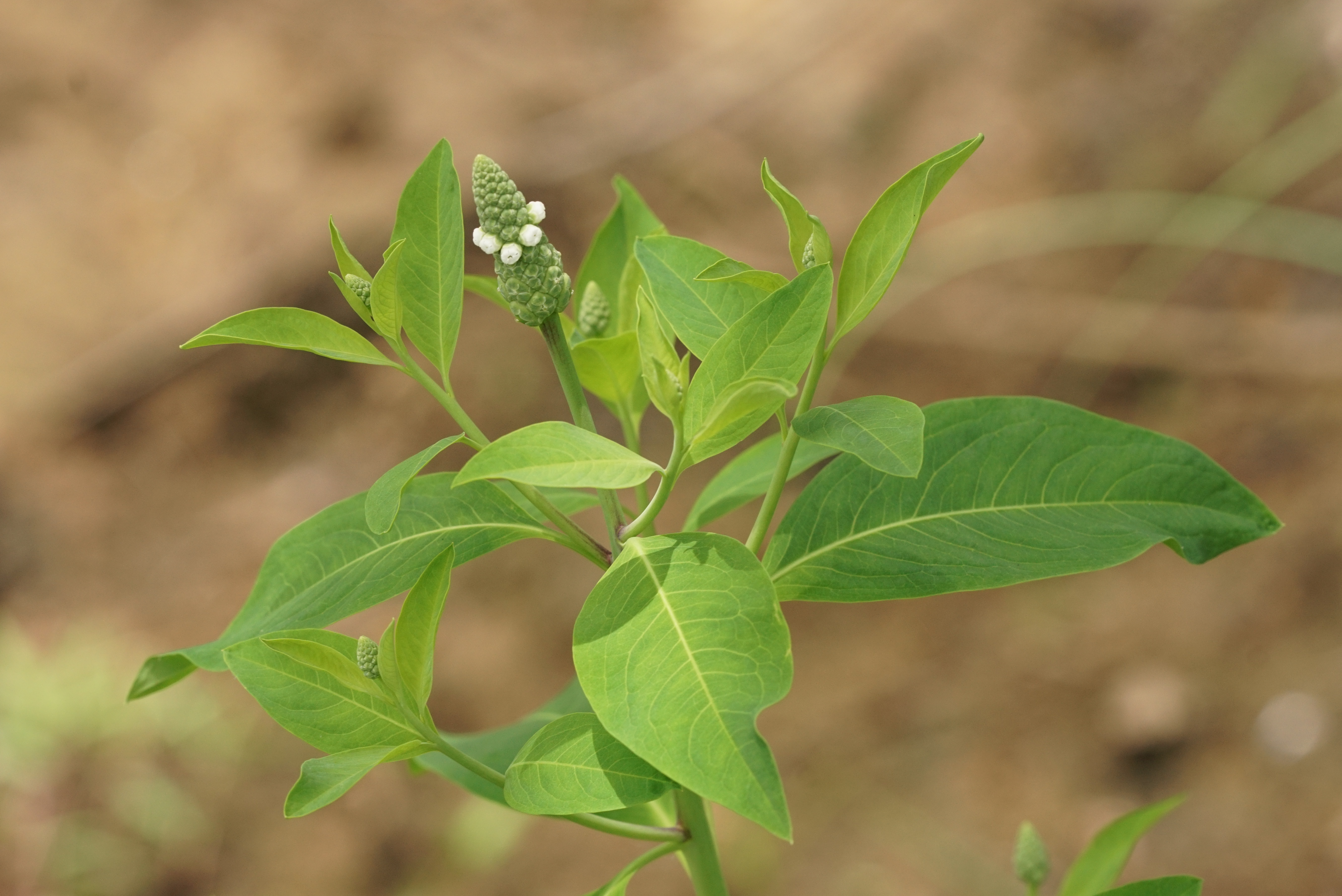
- In bloom
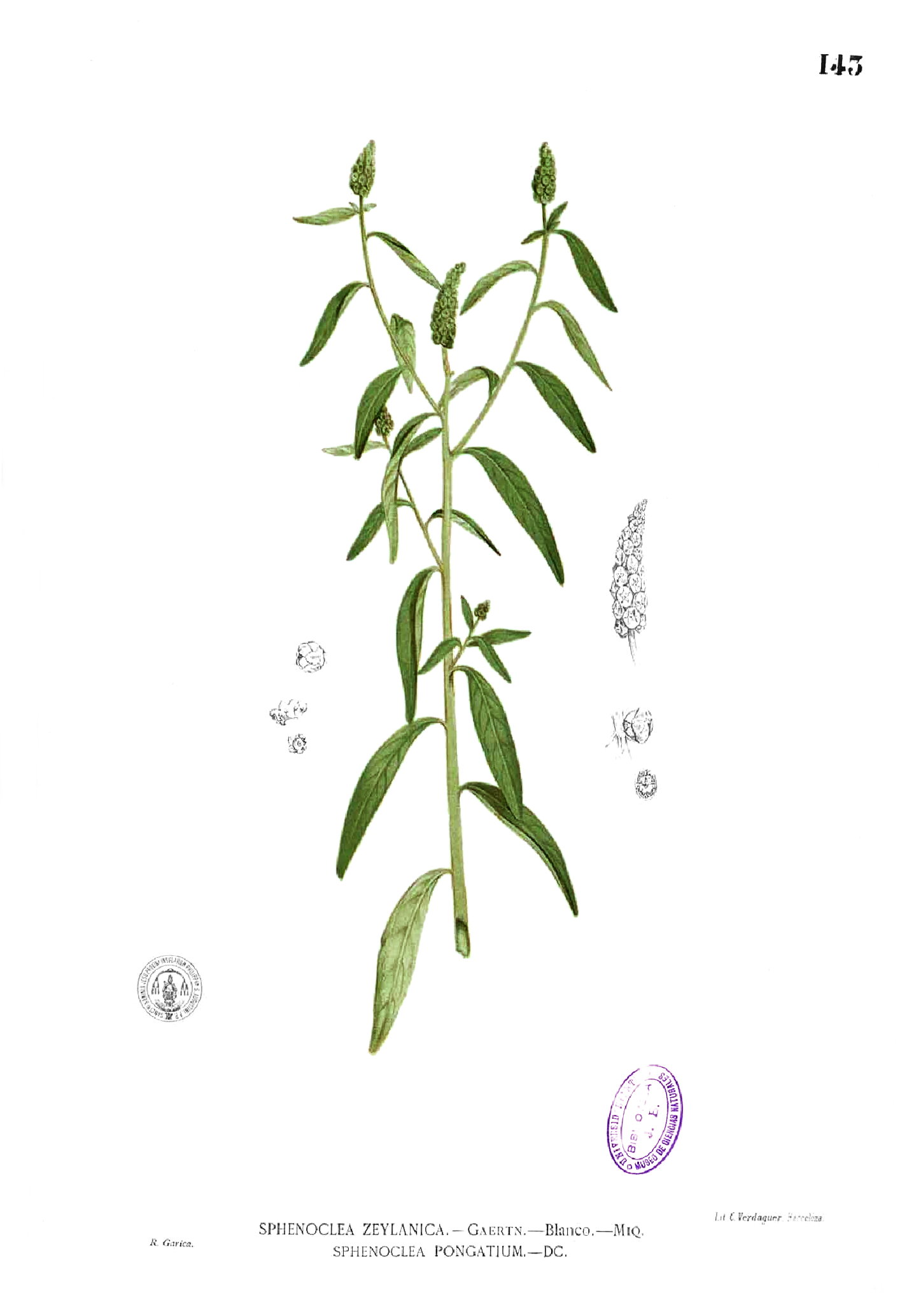
- Botanical illustration

Scientific classification
- Kingdom: Plantae
- Clade: Tracheophytes
- Clade: Angiosperms
- Clade: Eudicots
- Clade: Asterids
- Order: Solanales
- Family: Sphenocleaceae
- Genus: Sphenoclea
- Species: S. zeylanica

Binomial name
- Sphenoclea zeylanica Gaertn.

Synonyms
- List: Reichelia palustris Blanco; Schrebera pongati DC.; Pongatium indicum Lam.; Pongatium spongiosum Blanco; Pongatium zeylanicum Kuntze; Rapinia herbacea Lour.; Sphenoclea pongatium A.DC.

= Sphenoclea zeylanica =

Species of plant in the genus Sphenoclea

Sphenoclea zeylanica, called chickenspike, gooseweed, and wedgewort, is a widespread species of flowering plant in the genus Sphenoclea, native to Africa, Madagascar, tropical and subtropical Asia, and Australia. It is widely introduced in the New World tropics and subtopics from the southern United States to northern Argentina. Its young leaves are edible and are occasionally eaten, perhaps with a light boiling. A common weed of rice paddies, it can cause yield losses from 25 to 50%.
