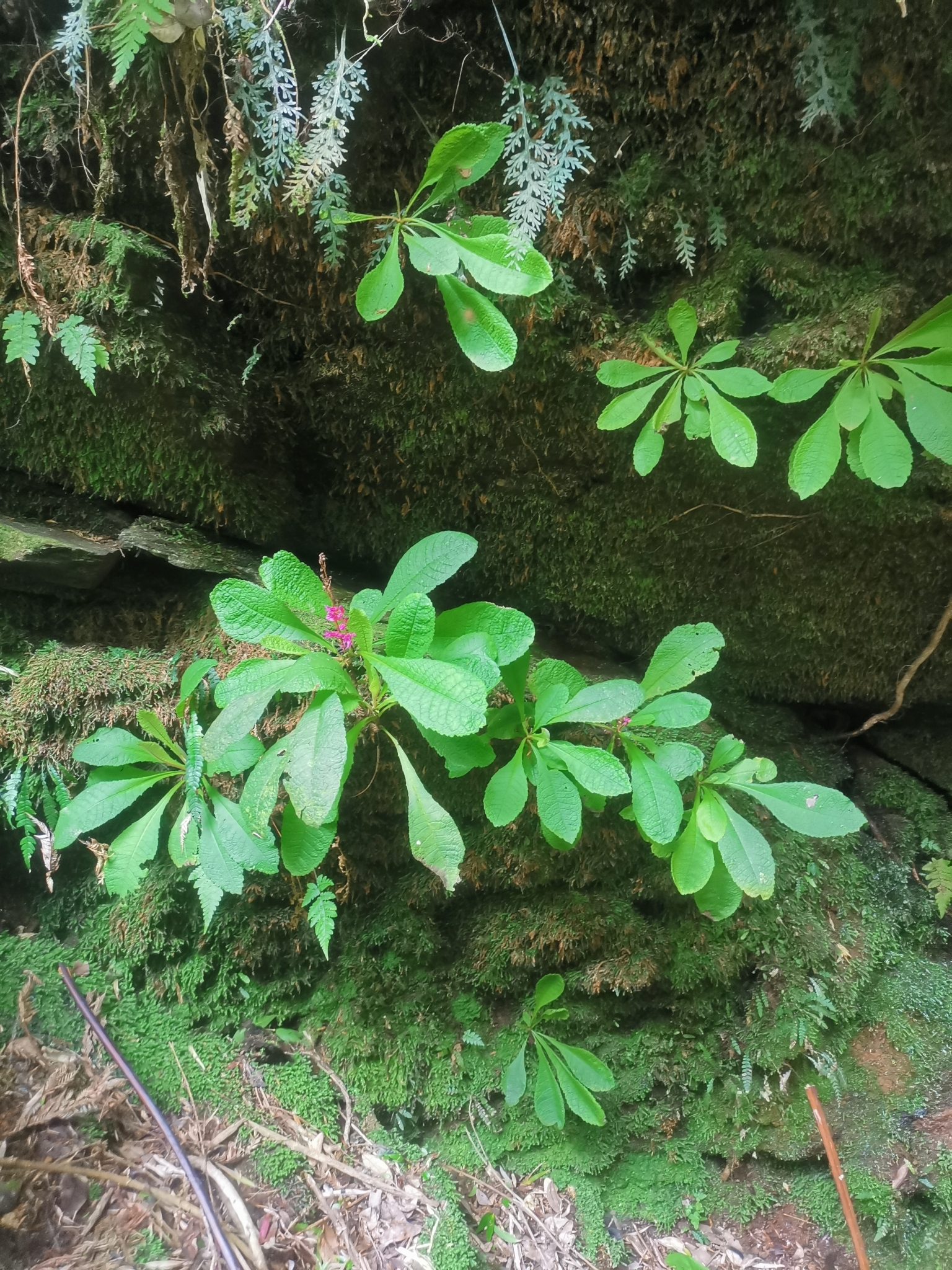
- Valdivia gayana in its natural habitat

Scientific classification
- Kingdom: Plantae
- Clade: Tracheophytes
- Clade: Angiosperms
- Clade: Eudicots
- Clade: Asterids
- Order: Escalloniales
- Family: Escalloniaceae
- Genus: Valdivia; Gay ex J.Rémy in C.Gay
- Species: V. gayana

Binomial name
- Valdivia gayana J.Rémy

= Valdivia gayana =

Species of flowering plant

Valdivia gayana is the sole accepted species in the genus Valdivia, a monotypic genus of flowering plant in the Escalloniaceae family. It is a subshrub with dry fruits that are indehiscent (they do not open). Its native distribution includes only three known localities in the Valdivia Province in Chile, South America.
