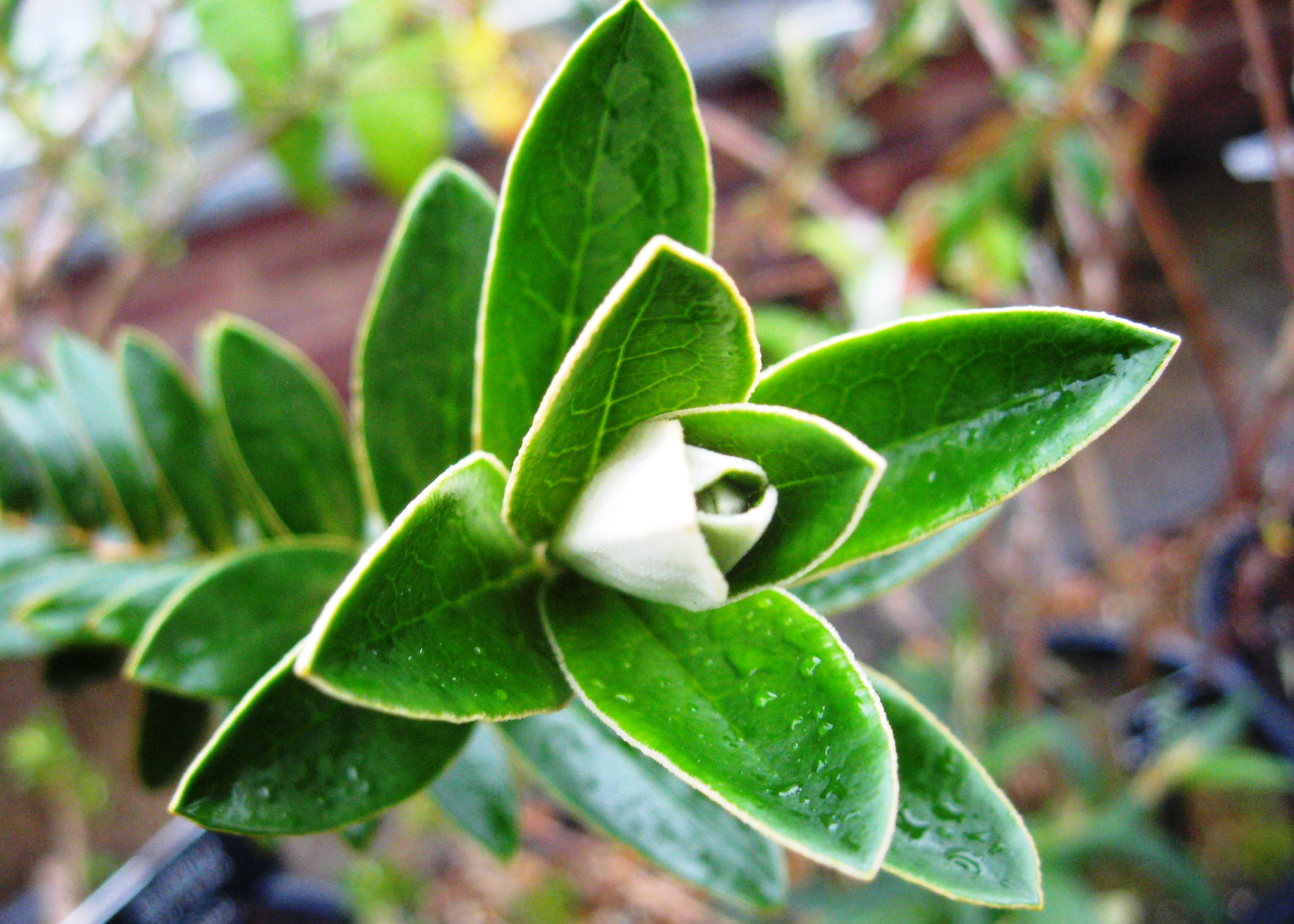
- Buddleja coriacea foliage, Longstock Park Nursery

Conservation status
- Least Concern (IUCN 3.1)

Scientific classification
- Kingdom: Plantae
- Clade: Embryophytes
- Clade: Tracheophytes
- Clade: Spermatophytes
- Clade: Angiosperms
- Clade: Eudicots
- Clade: Asterids
- Order: Lamiales
- Family: Scrophulariaceae
- Genus: Buddleja
- Species: B. coriacea

Binomial name
- Buddleja coriacea J.Rémy

Synonyms
- Buddleja oblongifolia Rusby; Buddleja rhododendroides Kraenzl.

= Buddleja coriacea =

Species of tree

Buddleja coriacea is a variable species endemic to the high Andes from the Cordillera Blanca in Peru to Lake Titicaca in Bolivia. It is also native to Ecuador. It grows on dry to semi-humid rocky soils at elevations of 3,000–4,350 m, where temperatures range from −3° to 15° C. and the winds are both strong and persistent. The species was first named and described by Rémy in 1847.

== Description ==
Buddleja coriacea typically makes a densely crowned, sprawling trioecious shrub or tree, branching almost at ground level. Usually growing to less than 4 m in height in the wild, it can occasionally reach 12 m, with stems up to 40 cm in diameter; the bark is fissured. The species is chiefly distinguished by its small, thick, leathery leaves, 1–4 cm long by 0.5–1.5 cm wide, with 3–4 mm petioles. The upper surfaces of the leaves are dark-green and glabrous, contrasting with the undersides which are covered in a cinnamon-brown indumentum. The scented inflorescences comprise 3–8 pairs of head-like cymes, 0.9–1.2 cm in diameter, of 8–12 flowers, the corollas 4.5–6 mm in length, deep yellow to orange-yellow, becoming orange-red with age. Flowering occurs throughout the year, but most commonly between December and June. Ploidy: 2n = 76 (tetraploid).

== Cultivation ==
Buddleja coriacea is cultivated in the high Andes as a field windbreak, as a source of humus for soil improvement, and as high quality, rotproof timber for use in building construction and manufacture of agricultural tools. The shrub was introduced to horticulture in the UK circa 1994, and specimens are held as part of the NCCPG national collection at the Longstock Park Nursery, near Stockbridge. Although not entirely hardy in the UK, the shrub can survive most winters with a modicum of protection; overwinter waterlogging regarded as a greater danger to the plant. The shrub has never been known to flower in the UK owing to either the insufficient intensity or duration of sunlight. Hardiness: USDA zone 9.

== Hybrids ==
The species is believed to commonly hybridize with B. montana and B. incana in the wild.
