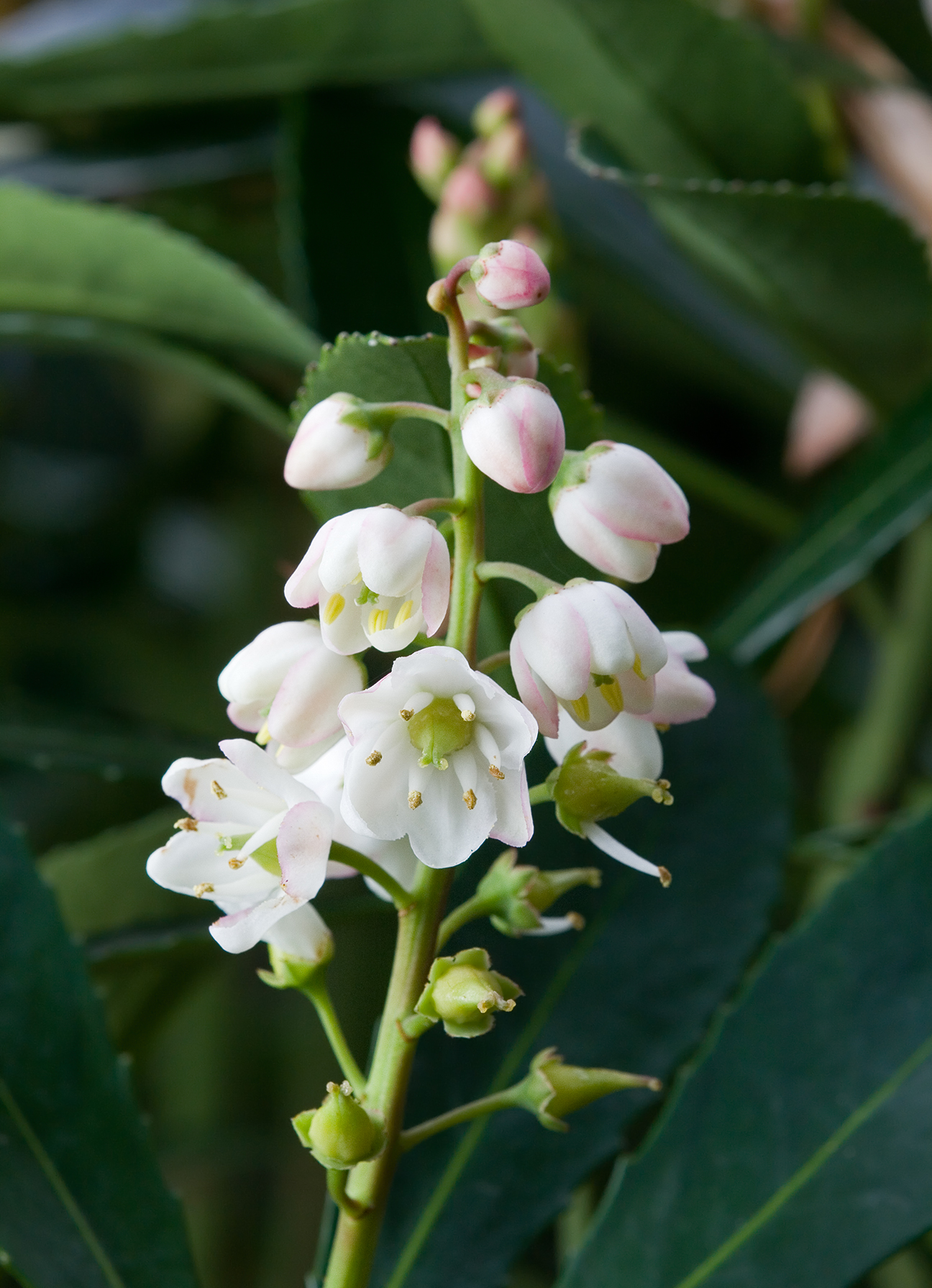

Scientific classification
- Kingdom: Plantae
- Clade: Tracheophytes
- Clade: Angiosperms
- Clade: Eudicots
- Clade: Asterids
- Order: Escalloniales
- Family: Escalloniaceae
- Genus: Anopterus
- Species: A. glandulosus

Binomial name
- Anopterus glandulosus Labill.

= Anopterus glandulosus =

Tasmanian laurel

Species of tree

Anopterus glandulosus, commonly known as native laurel or Tasmanian laurel, is a species of shrub or small tree in the family Escalloniaceae. Endemic to south and southwestern Tasmania, A. glandulosus is widespread in the moist understoreys of Tasmanian temperate rainforests and wet sclerophyll forests from sea level to mountainous regions below 1,200 metres (3,937 ft) above sea level.

== Taxonomy ==
The name Anopterus comes from the Ancient Greek words ano (upwards) and pteron (wing), referring to its characteristic winged seeds, while glandulosus refers to the glandular tips present at the end of each leaf serration. The signature 'Labill' often appears after the scientific name of this species as it was first described by Jacques Labillardière in 1805. It is one of two Tasmanian plants in the ancient Gondwanan family Escalloniaceae, the other being Tetracarpaea tasmanica.

Anopterus is an endemic Australian genus and A. glandulosus is one of two species in the genus. The other species, A. macleayanus (Queensland laurel or Macleay laurel) is found in subtropical, warm and cool temperate forests near the coast in New South Wales and Queensland.

== Description ==
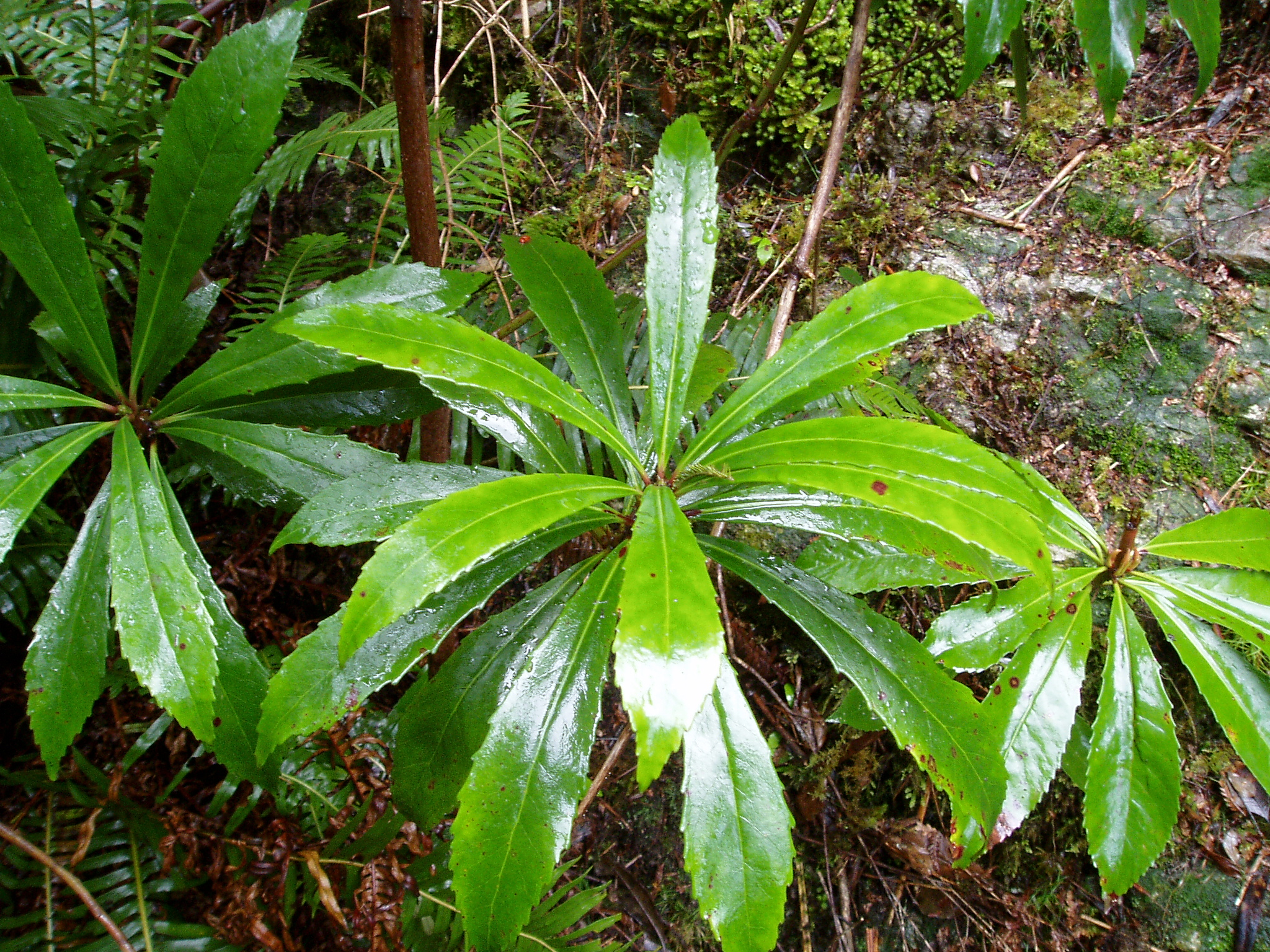
Anopterus shrub

Anopterus glandulosus usually grows as a small understorey shrub ranging from 2 to 4 metres (6 ft 7 in to 13 ft 1 in) in height and 2 to 3 m (6 ft 7 in to 9 ft 10 in) in width; however, it can be grown as a small canopy tree up to 10 m (33 ft). In shaded understorey conditions its growth habit is often straggly with branches forming layers resulting in coppiced growth. Leaves are large, 7 to 17 cm (3 to 7 in) in length and 2 to 4 cm (0.8 to 1.6 in) in width. Leaves are thick, dark green with a glabrous surface and glossy appearance. Leaf margins are serrated with blunt tips and a black gland at the apex of each serration. Leaf shape ranges from lanceolate elliptical to oblanceolate with an acute apex and leaf base which narrows into a short petiole.

Flowering occurs in late spring and often again in autumn. The flower heads, known as inflorescences, are borne in terminal racemes, which are about the same length as the leaves. Flowers are bell-shaped and approximately 2 cm (0.8 in) in diameter, occurring on slender pedicels which are often recurved. The flowers are composed of six ovate petals, 10 to 12 mm (0.4 to 0.5 in) in length, which overlap and are white or pink flushed. Flowers usually have six sepals, which are joined at the base with spreading lobes. There are six stamens opposite the sepals, which are filamentous and shorter than petals.) Each flower has two large joined carpels, which are bright green in colour. The ovary is superior and conical, tapering to a short style and bifid stigma.

=== Similar species ===
The foliage arrangement and habit of Anopterus glandulosus are similar to Cenarrhenes nitida (Port Arthur/ native plum) with opposite leaves arranged in apparent spreading whorls. A. glandulosus can be distinguished from Cenarrhenes nitida by a tendency for leaves to occur in clusters at the ends of branches. Cenarrhenes nitida can also be distinguished by the absence of glands at leaf tips and an unpleasant foetid odour when leaves are crushed.

== Ecology and distribution ==
Anopterus glandulosus is a slow-growing shrub to small tree, which occurs in wet sclerophyll forest and rainforests, in the south and west of Tasmania at elevations below 1200 m. A. glandulosus prefers cool, moist conditions in partly shaded conditions with well-drained soils, from loamy to sandy and highly organic soils. More seedlings of this species germinate and grow on rotting fallen logs than soil. It most commonly occurs as an understorey shrub often under a canopy of Nothofagus cunninghamii (myrtle beech). It is susceptible to the plant disease Phytophthora cinnamomi, which causes 'root rot' or 'dieback', and does not tolerate excess phosphorus. However, this species is highly adaptable and tolerates harsh conditions, including frost and snow. Due to its rainforest habitat, it is also adapted for continuous regeneration and regenerates well after disturbance, often undergoing rapid regrowth to form thickets in response to mechanical damage. The attractive and strongly scented flowers produce large amounts of nectar, attracting insects, and birds such as honeyeaters that feed on both nectar and insects.

=== Status ===
The species was listed as not threatened and present in state reserves by the National Parks and Wildlife Service Tasmania in 1997, and remains widespread and non-threatened.

== Cultivation ==
Anopterus glandulosus is an attractive and easily cultivated plant, making it excellent for gardens. Successful cultivation can be achieved by germination of fresh seed or propagation from semi-hardwood cuttings taken in March or April. Germination from seed can take 4–5 months, and requires constant moisture.

This species tolerates full sun to shade and is easily grown in a semi-protected environment, such as against a wall or fence, and grows particularly well as a container plant. It requires ample water in summer and benefits from application of non-phosphate based organic fertilisers along with manure and mulch. This species also responds well to annual pruning, and its attractive evergreen foliage can be harvested for floriculture.
