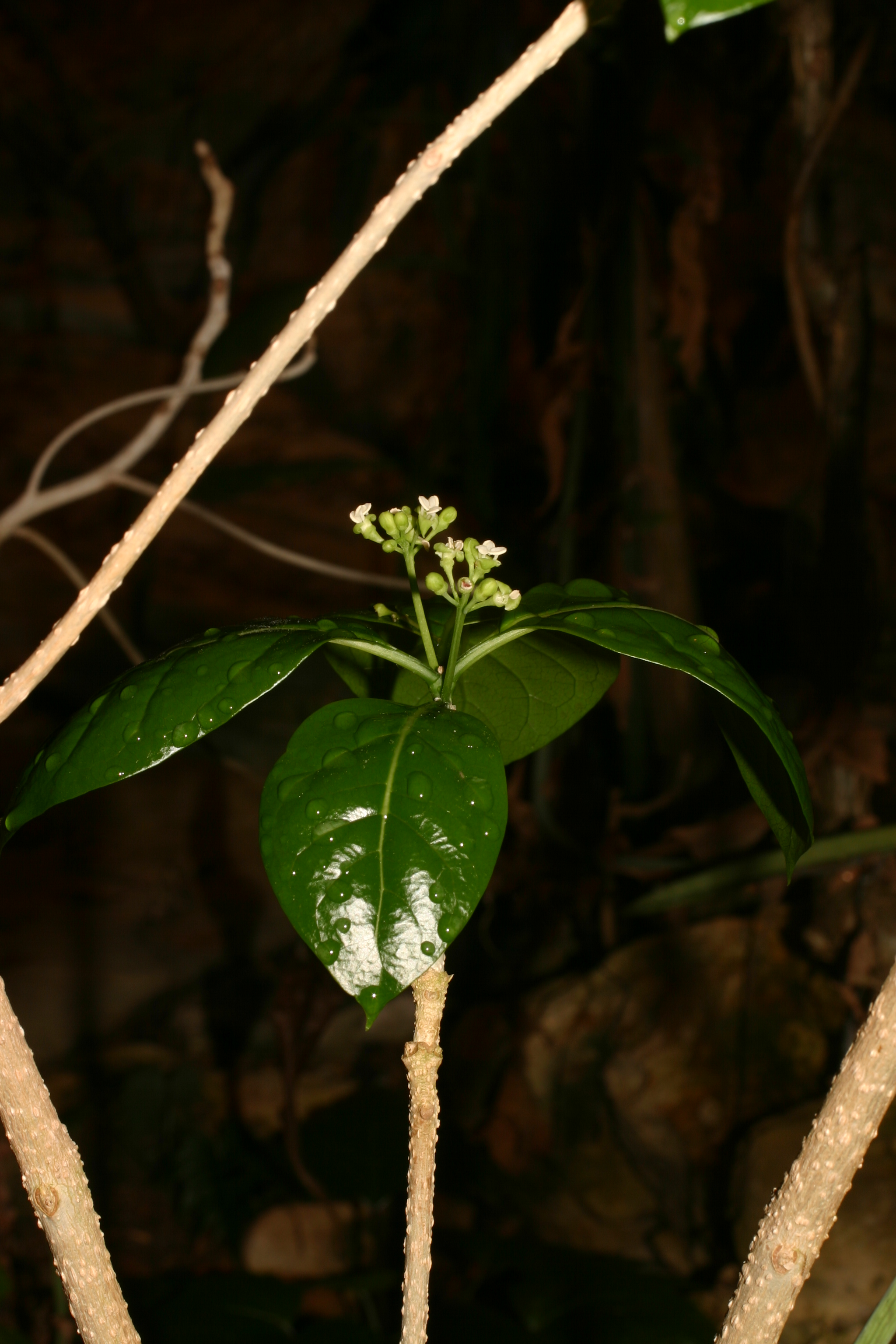
- Grevea madagascariensis

Scientific classification
- Kingdom: Plantae
- Clade: Embryophytes
- Clade: Tracheophytes
- Clade: Spermatophytes
- Clade: Angiosperms
- Clade: Eudicots
- Clade: Asterids
- Order: Solanales
- Family: Montiniaceae
- Genus: Grevea; Baill.

= Grevea =

Genus of plants

Grevea is a genus of flowering plants belonging to the family Montiniaceae.

It is native to the countries of Liberia, Republic of the Congo, south-eastern Kenya, Tanzania, Mozambique and Madagascar.

The genus name of Grevea is in honour of Mr. Grevé (d. 1895), French naturalist and rancher on Madagascar, who collected plants and fossils. It was first described and published in Bull. Mens. Soc. Linn. Paris vol.1 on page 420 in 1884.

Known species, according to Kew:

- Grevea bosseri Letouzey – Liberia and Republic of the Congo
- Grevea eggelingii Milne-Redh. – Kenya, Tanzania, and Mozambique
- Grevea madagascariensis Baill. – Madagascar
