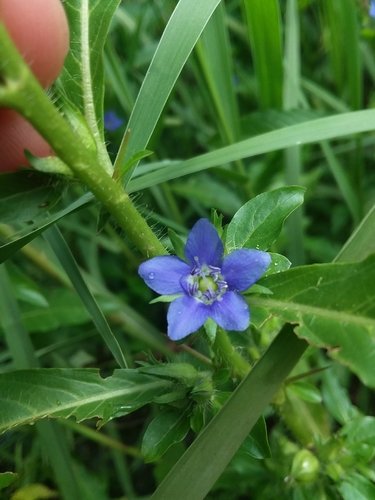

Conservation status
- Secure (NatureServe)

Scientific classification
- Kingdom: Plantae
- Clade: Tracheophytes
- Clade: Angiosperms
- Clade: Eudicots
- Clade: Asterids
- Order: Solanales
- Family: Hydroleaceae
- Genus: Hydrolea
- Species: H. quadrivalvis

Binomial name
- Hydrolea quadrivalvis Walter

= Hydrolea quadrivalvis =

Waterpod

Species of flowering plant

Hydrolea quadrivalvis is a species of flowering plant in the family Hydroleaceae that is known by the common name of waterpod. It is native to the Southeastern United States, where it is found in the states of Louisiana, Mississippi, Alabama, Florida, Georgia, South Carolina, North Carolina, Virginia, and Tennessee. It is also found in the state of Maryland as an introduced species.

Hydrolea quadrivalvis is a perennial herbaceous plant which grows up to 6 decimeters tall. It has lanceolate leaves that range from 4 to 10 centimeters long and 10 to 25 millimeters wide, and most plants have stout thorns on nodes. It is an obligate wetland plant and often occurs in swamps and marshes Unlike its relatives, Hydrolea uniflora and Hydrolea palustris, Hydrolea quadrivalvis has sepals and stems with spreading, jointed hairs.
