= Buddleja montana =

Scientific classification
- Kingdom: Plantae
- Clade: Embryophytes
- Clade: Tracheophytes
- Clade: Spermatophytes
- Clade: Angiosperms
- Clade: Eudicots
- Clade: Asterids
- Order: Lamiales
- Family: Scrophulariaceae
- Genus: Buddleja
- Species: B. montana

Binomial name
- Buddleja montana Britton

Synonyms
- Buddleja coriacea Rémy var. B.; Buddleja oblongifolia Rusby

Species of tree

Buddleja montana is a species endemic to the rocky hillsides of the cordilleras of Peru at altitudes of 2,700 – 4,000 m, extending into Bolivia; it was named and described by Britton in 1898. The Latin specific epithet montana refers to mountains or coming from mountains.

== Description ==
Buddleja montana is a dioecious shrub or small tree 2 – 8 m high, and is closely related to B. coriacea. The young branches are subquadrangular and tomentose, bearing coriaceous leaves oblong to elliptic 3 – 8 cm long by 0.5 – 1.5 cm wide, glabrescent above and thickly tomentose below, with 0.4 – 0.7 cm petioles. The deep yellow to orange inflorescence is paniculate with 1 – 2 orders of branches, 3 – 7 cm long by 2 – 6 cm wide, comprising small cymules; the corolla tubes 2.7 – 3.5 mm long.

== Cultivation ==
The shrub is not known to be in cultivation.
