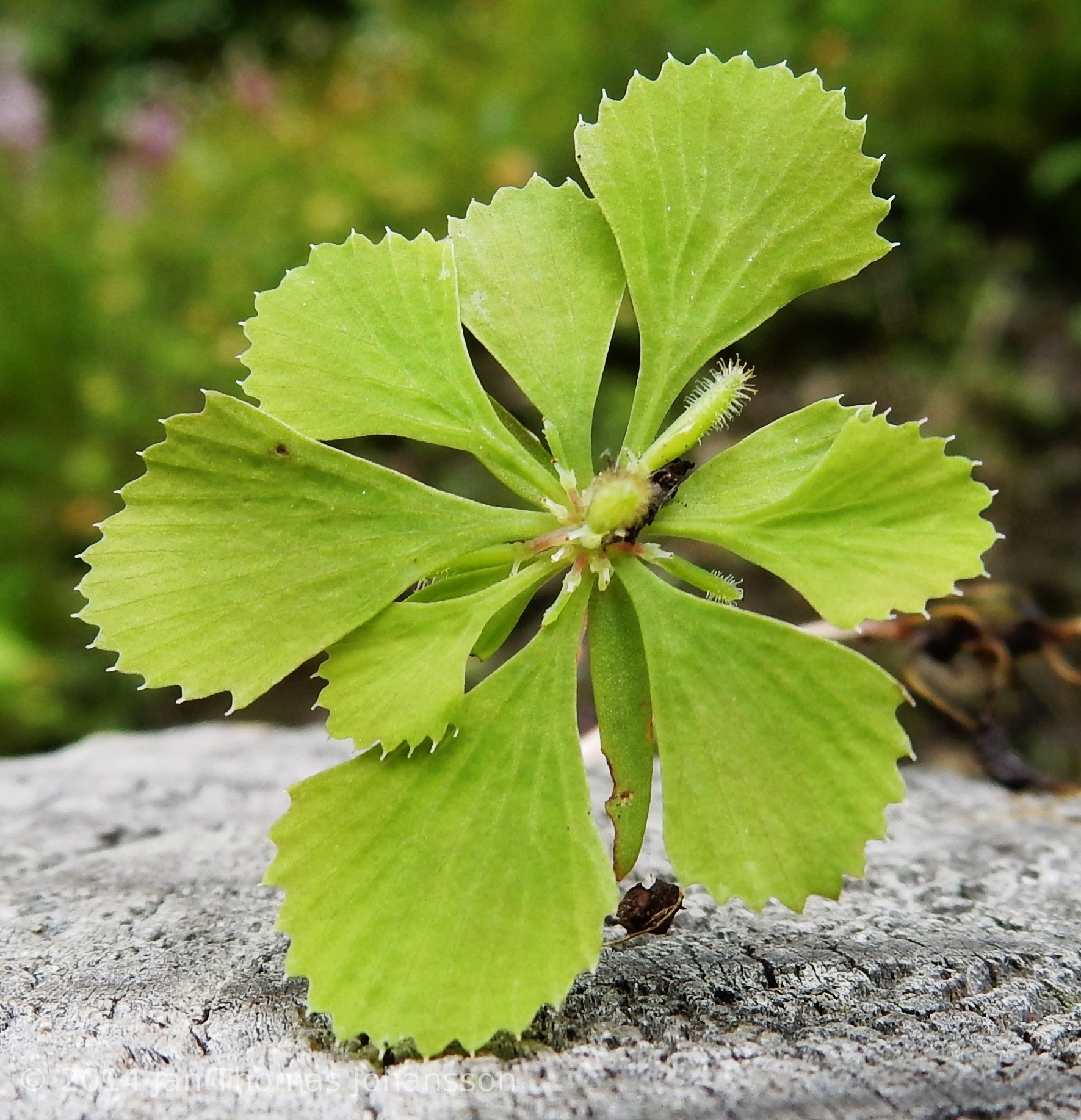
- Circaeaster agrestis

Scientific classification
- Kingdom: Plantae
- Clade: Tracheophytes
- Clade: Angiosperms
- Clade: Eudicots
- Order: Ranunculales
- Family: Circaeasteraceae; Hutch.

Genera
- Circaeaster; Kingdonia

= Circaeasteraceae =

Family of flowering plants

Circaeasteraceae is a family of two species of herbaceous plants native to China and the Himalayas.

The family has been recognized by many taxonomists. The APG II system (2003; unchanged from the APG system of 1998), recognizes it and places it in the order Ranunculales in the clade eudicots. It treats the family to consist of two genera each with a single species, Circaeaster agrestis and Kingdonia uniflora, but allows the option of segregating the latter species as family Kingdoniaceae. The APG III system of 2009 also recognizes the two species but no longer allows the optional segregation into Kingdoniaceae.
