= Native laurel =

Native laurel is a common name for several flowering plants and may refer to:

- Anopterus glandulosus, a shrub or small tree from Tasmania
- Cryptocarya glaucescens, a tree from eastern Australia

Laurel leaves are used in cooking
