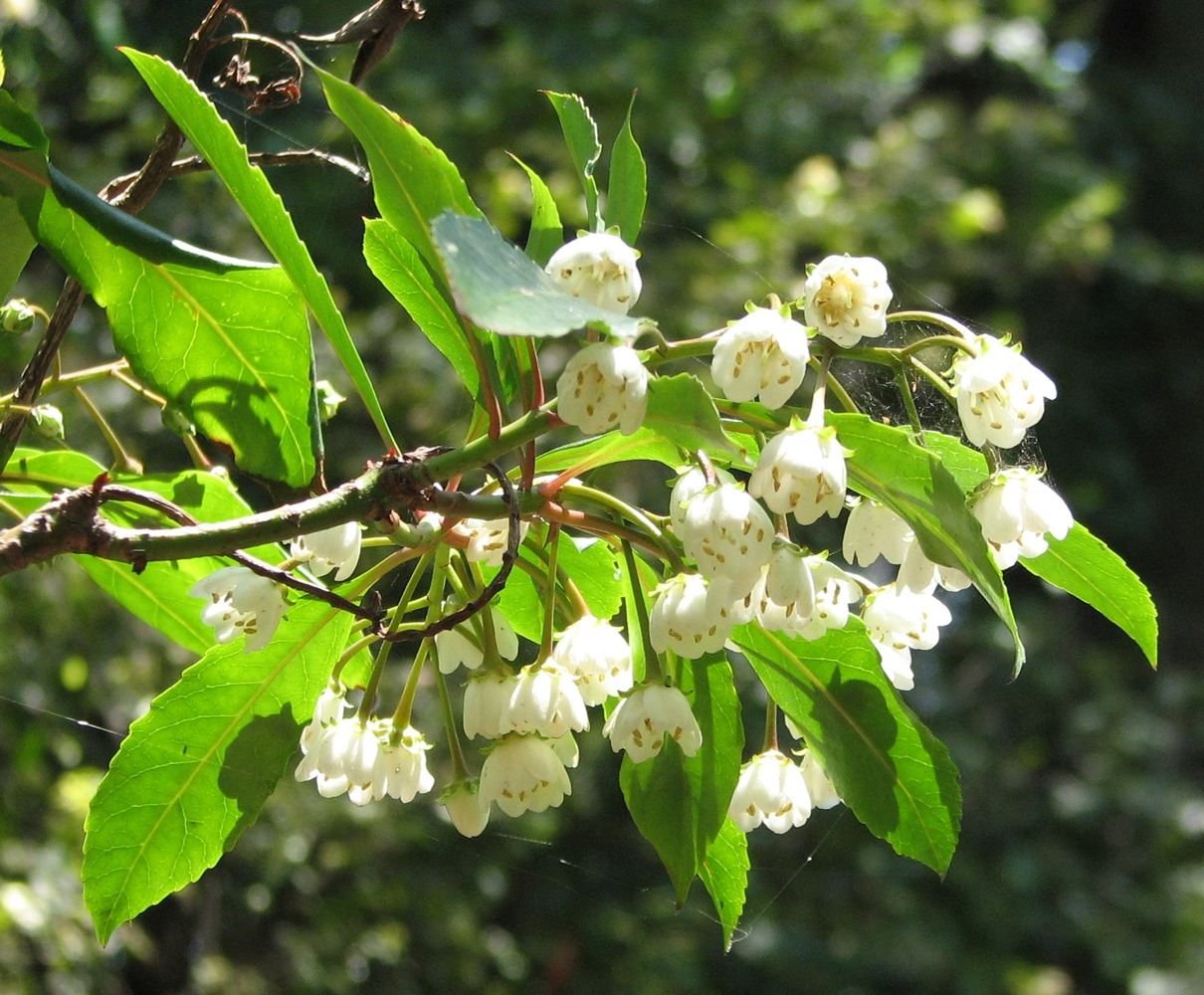
- Anopterus macleayanus

Scientific classification
- Kingdom: Plantae
- Clade: Tracheophytes
- Clade: Angiosperms
- Clade: Eudicots
- Clade: Asterids
- Order: Escalloniales
- Family: Escalloniaceae
- Genus: Anopterus; Labill.

Species
- See text

= Anopterus =

Genus of flowering plants

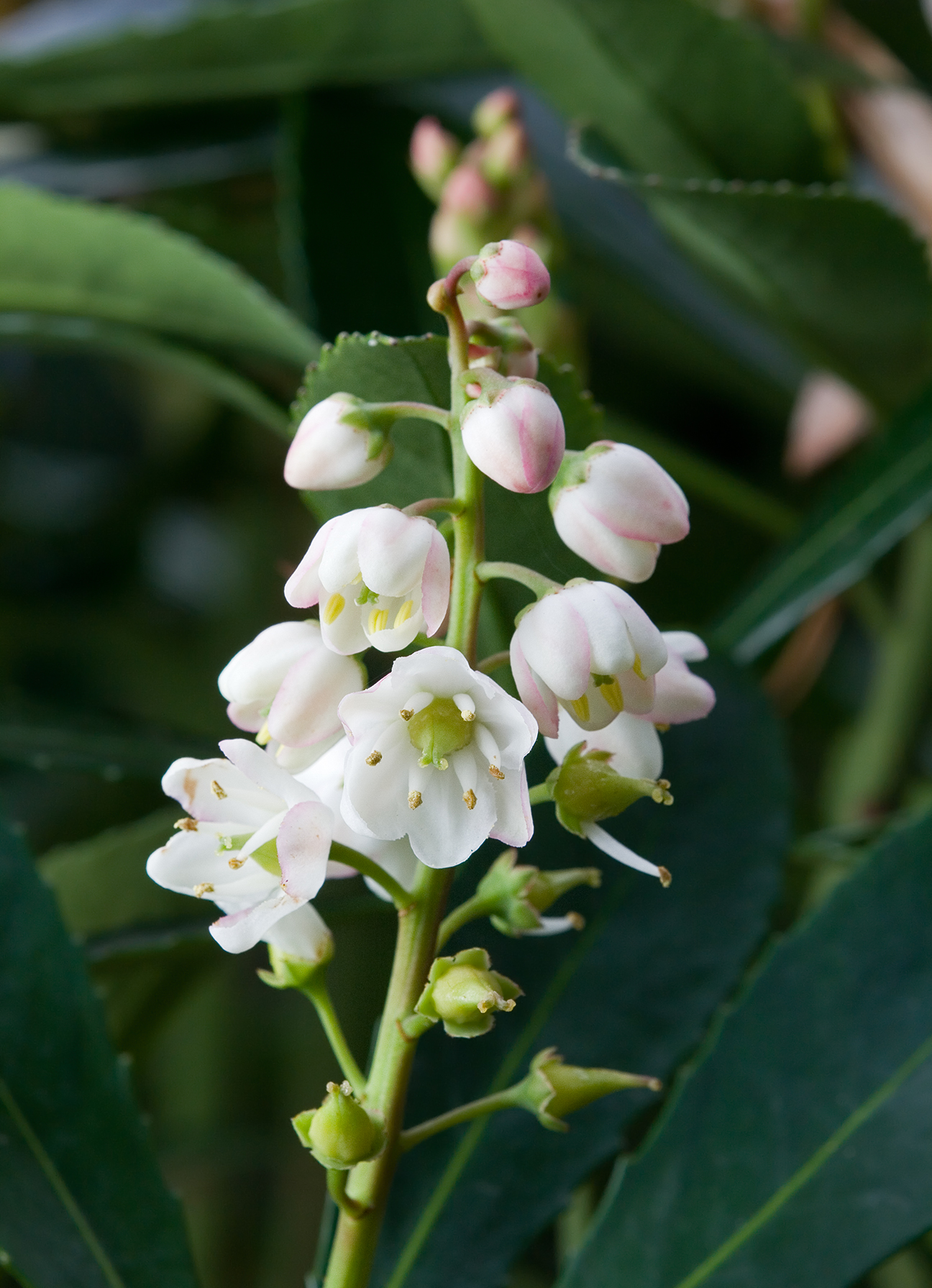
Anopterus glandulosus

Anopterus is a genus of two species of shrubs or small trees.

== Species ==
- Anopterus glandulosus (Tasmanian laurel) - western Tasmania
- Anopterus macleayanus (Mountain laurel) - eastern Australia
