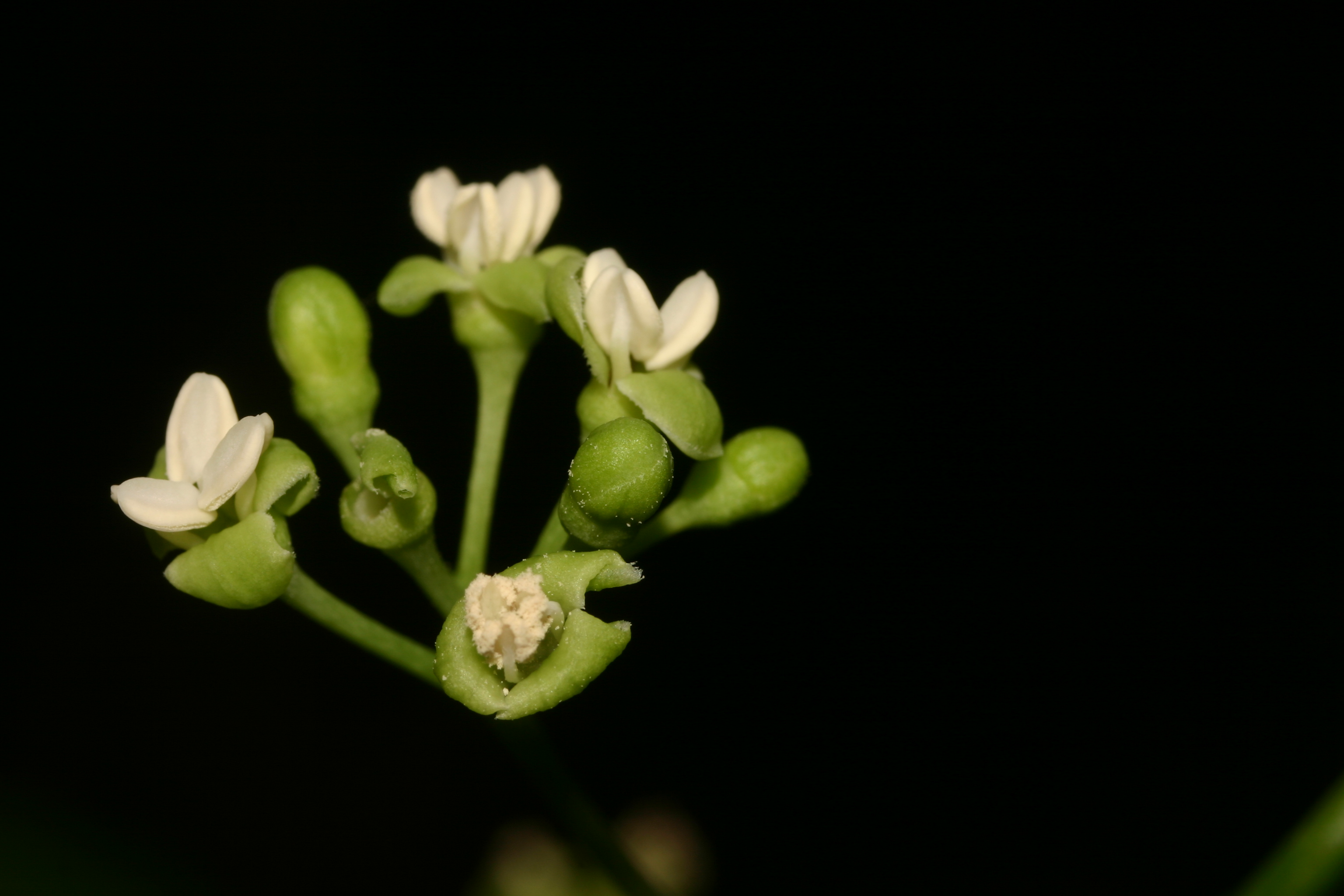
- Grevea madagascariensis

Scientific classification
- Kingdom: Plantae
- Clade: Tracheophytes
- Clade: Angiosperms
- Clade: Eudicots
- Clade: Asterids
- Order: Solanales
- Family: Montiniaceae; Nakai

Genera
- Grevea; Kaliphora; Montinia

= Montiniaceae =

Family of flowering plants

Montiniaceae is a family of flowering plants. It includes two or three genera of shrubs and small trees, native to southwest Africa and tropical East Africa as well as Madagascar. The genera Grevea and Montinia are included in most classification systems. The genus Kaliphora is included in the Montiniaceae in many newer classification systems, including the APG II, but other classification systems, including that of Armen Takhtajan, include Kaliphora in its own family, the Kaliphoraceae.
