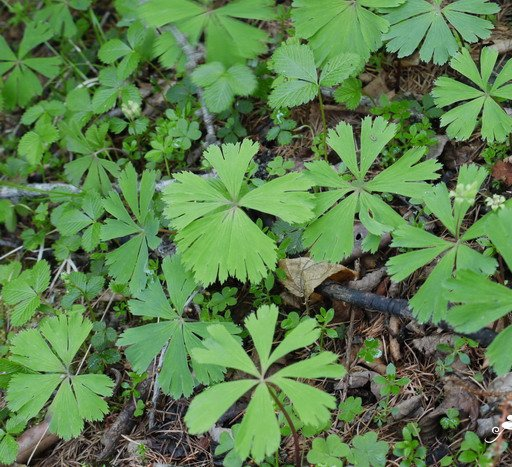

Scientific classification
- Kingdom: Plantae
- Clade: Tracheophytes
- Clade: Angiosperms
- Clade: Eudicots
- Order: Ranunculales
- Family: Circaeasteraceae
- Genus: Kingdonia; Balf.f. & W.W.Sm.
- Species: K. uniflora

Binomial name
- Kingdonia uniflora Balf.f. & W.W.Sm.

= Kingdonia =

Genus of flowering plants

Kingdonia uniflora is a species of perennial herb native to China. The plants have one leaf and a 100-millimetre (4-inch) flower stalk with a 8 mm (3/8 in) flower.

It grows at high elevations in West and North China. Most of the plants are found in western Yunnan. It is an endangered species. Analysis of its draft genome hinted that its restricted distribution and endangered status relates to the loss of specific gene families.

== Classification ==
Kingdonia is sometimes classified as the only genus in the family Kingdoniaceae or as a member of the family Circaeasteraceae along with Circaeaster agrestis, specifically in the APG III system of classification. Other sources may classify Kingdonia in the buttercup family, Ranunculaceae. In any case it is in the order Ranunculales.
