= Kaliphora =

Conservation status
- Least Concern (IUCN 3.1)

Scientific classification
- Kingdom: Plantae
- Clade: Embryophytes
- Clade: Tracheophytes
- Clade: Spermatophytes
- Clade: Angiosperms
- Clade: Eudicots
- Clade: Asterids
- Order: Solanales
- Family: Montiniaceae
- Genus: Kaliphora; Hook.f.
- Species: K. madagascariensis

Binomial name
- Kaliphora madagascariensis Hook.f.

Genus of shrubs

Kaliphora madagascariensis is a species of evergreen shrub or small tree. It is endemic to Madagascar, where it inhabits subhumid woodlands and forests in eastern Madagascar, in the provinces of Antananarivo, Antsiranana, Fianarantsoa, and Mahajanga.

== Description ==
Kaliphora madagascariensis is a shrub or tree which grows 1 to 4 meters tall.

== Range and habitat ==
Kaliphora madagascariensis is widespread in northern, central, and south-central Madagascar. It is chiefly found in the highlands of former Antsiranana, Mahajanga, Antananarivo and Fianaratsoa provinces. The species' estimated area of occupancy (AOO) is 420 km^{2}, and estimated extent of occurrence (EOO) is 149,903 km^{2}, based on known extant subpopulations.

Its principal habitats are dry, humid, and subhumid montane evergreen forests. It ranges from 50 to 2000 meters elevation.

== Classification ==
Kaliphora madagascariensis is the sole species of the genus Kaliphora. Some recent classification systems, including the APG IV, classify the genus as part of family Montiniaceae; other systems, including that of Armen Takhtajan, classify Kaliphora in its own family, Kaliphoraceae.
