= Rayenia =

Scientific classification
- Kingdom: Plantae
- Clade: Tracheophytes
- Clade: Angiosperms
- Clade: Eudicots
- Clade: Asterids
- Order: Escalloniales
- Family: Escalloniaceae
- Genus: Rayenia; Menegoz & A.E.Villarroel (2021)
- Species: R. malalcurensis

Binomial name
- Rayenia malalcurensis Menegoz & A.E.Villarroel (2021)

Genus of flowering plants

Rayenia malalcurensis is a species of flowering plant in the family Escalloniaceae. It is a subshrub endemic to subalpine areas of northeastern Ñuble Region in central Chile. It is the sole species in genus Rayenia.
