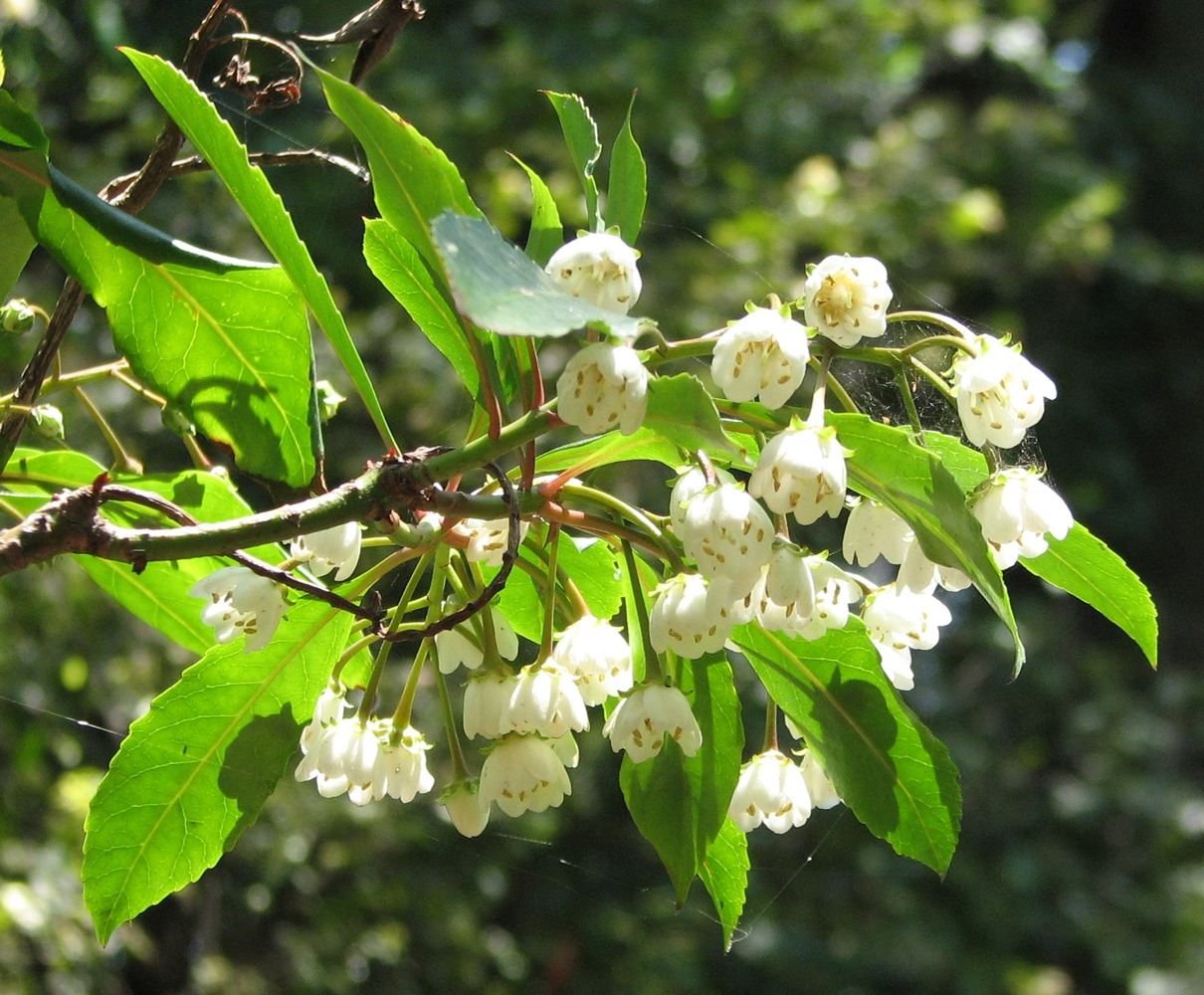

Scientific classification
- Kingdom: Plantae
- Clade: Tracheophytes
- Clade: Angiosperms
- Clade: Eudicots
- Clade: Asterids
- Order: Escalloniales
- Family: Escalloniaceae
- Genus: Anopterus
- Species: A. macleayanus

Binomial name
- Anopterus macleayanus F.Muell.

= Anopterus macleayanus =

Species of tree

Anopterus macleayanus, commonly known as Queensland laurel or Macleay laurel, is a shrub or small tree in the family Escalloniaceae. It is native to Queensland and New South Wales in Australia.

The species was formally described in 1859 by botanist Ferdinand von Mueller, having been collected from the summit of Mt Lindesay. It was named in honour of Sir William Macleay. It is one of two species that belong to the genus Anopterus.

A. macleayanus can grow up to 15 metres (50 ft) high and has oblanceolate (spear-shaped) leaves that are 10-to-30 cm long (3.9-to-11.8 in) and 2-to-4 cm wide (0.79-to-1.57 in) with blunt serrated margins. The juvenile leaves may be considerably larger. The petioles and leaf bases are red-tinged. The white flowers occur in racemes between October and December (mid spring to early summer) in its native range.

A. macleayanus is a plant of warm-temperate and subtropical rainforest from the Comboyne Plateau in New South Wales northwards into Queensland.

The thrips species Thrips setipennis was recovered from the flowers of A. macleayanus, suggesting it may be a pollinator.

Its long leaves with wavy margins and red-pink highlights give it horticultural potential. A. macleayanus grows best in part-shaded positions in well-drained soil in the garden, with added water during the summer. As a rainforest floor plant, it requires a sheltered position when becoming established. It is resilient but can be slow-growing. It can be grown in containers, even as an indoor plant.
