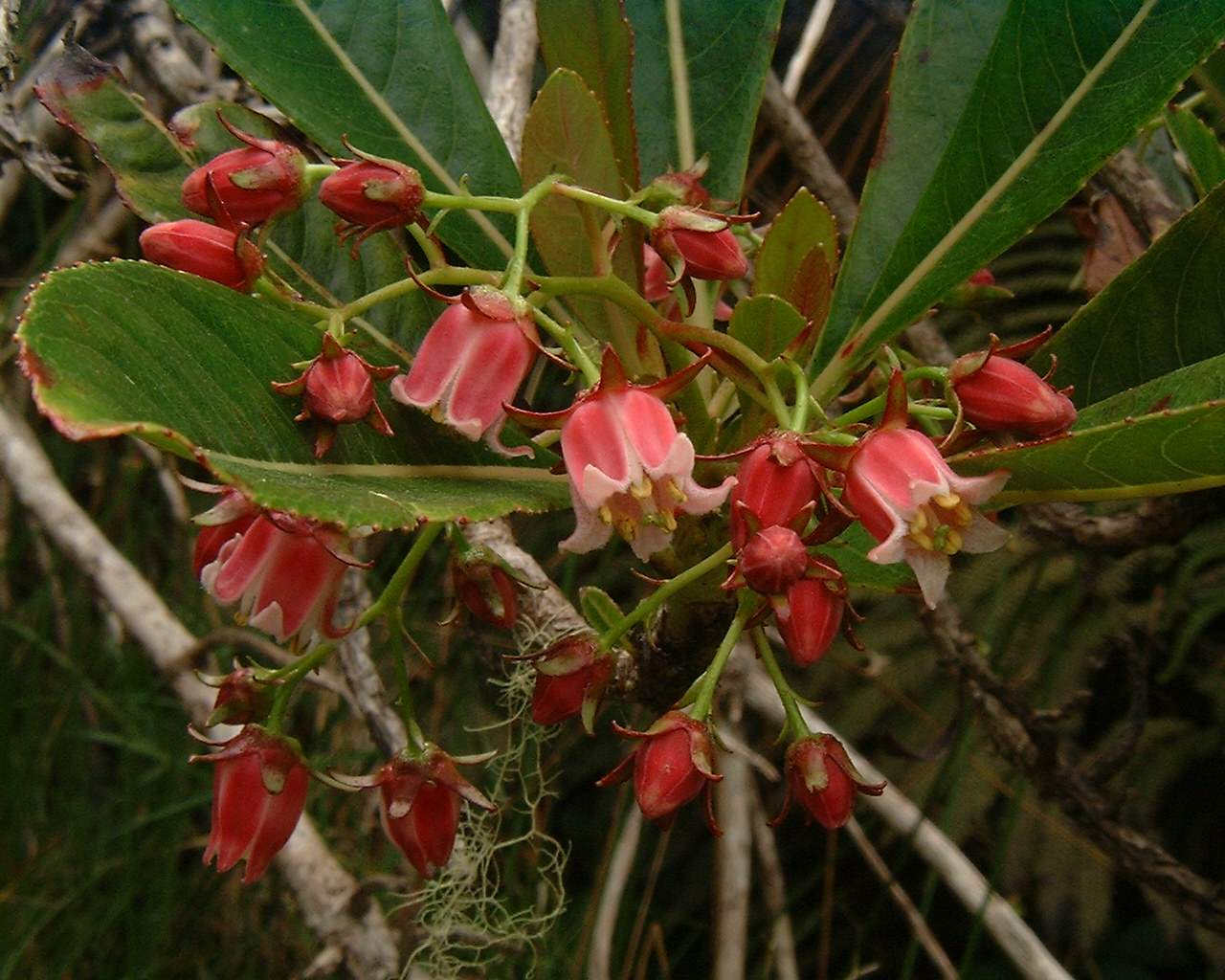
- Forgesia racemosa

Scientific classification
- Kingdom: Plantae
- Clade: Tracheophytes
- Clade: Angiosperms
- Clade: Eudicots
- Clade: Asterids
- Order: Escalloniales
- Family: Escalloniaceae
- Genus: Forgesia; Comm. ex Juss.
- Species: F. racemosa

Binomial name
- Forgesia racemosa J.F. Gmel.

= Forgesia =

Genus of plants

Forgesia is a genus of flowering plants in the Escalloniaceae family. The genus has one accepted species, Forgesia racemosa.
