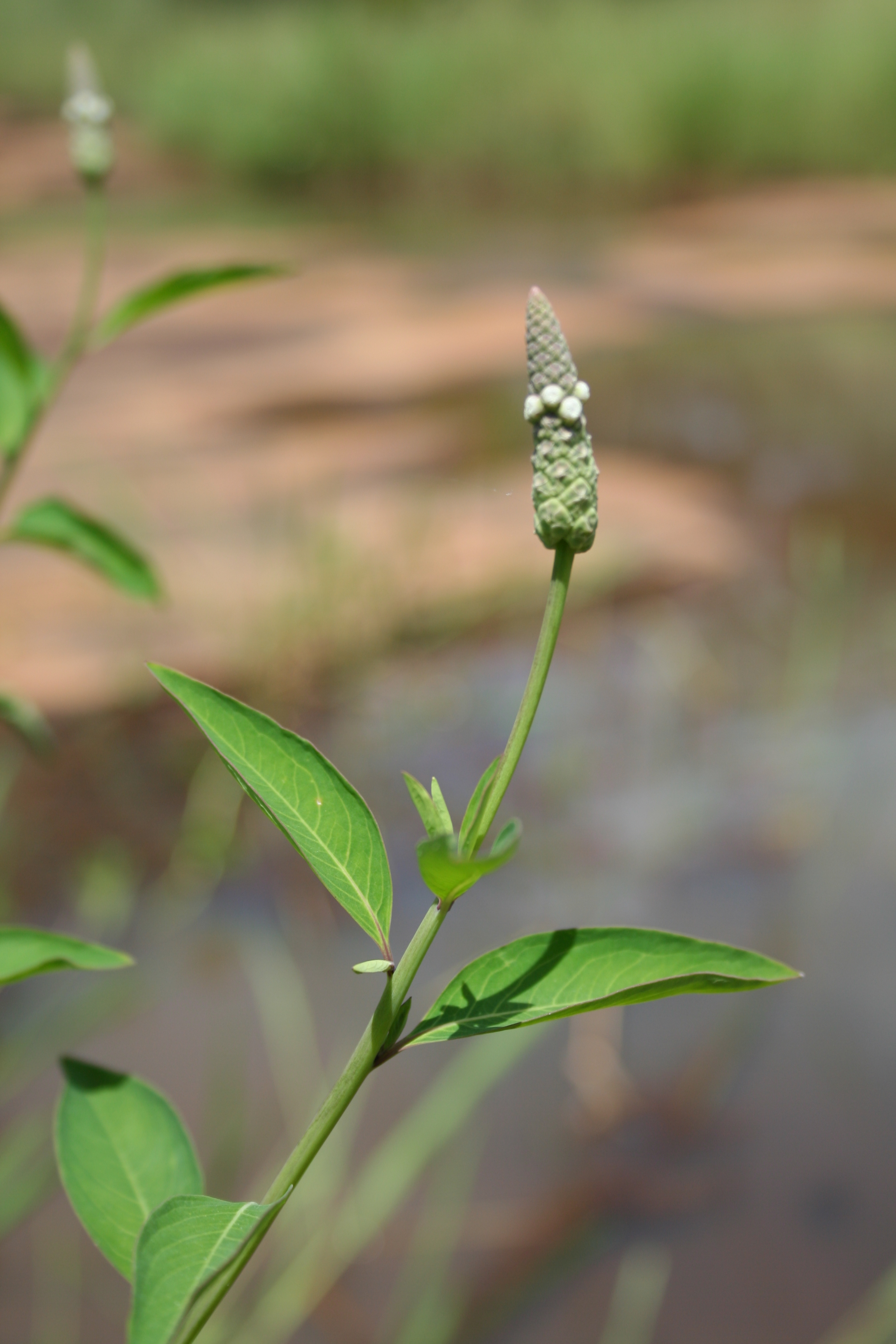
- S. zeylanica

Scientific classification
- Kingdom: Plantae
- Clade: Tracheophytes
- Clade: Angiosperms
- Clade: Eudicots
- Clade: Asterids
- Order: Solanales
- Family: Sphenocleaceae; T.Baskerv.
- Genus: Sphenoclea; Gaertn.

Species
- Sphenoclea zeylanica; Sphenoclea pongatium

= Sphenoclea =

Genus of herbs

Sphenoclea is a genus of succulent erect annual herbs. They occur in damp habitats throughout the tropics.

There are two species, S. zeylanica and S. pongatium. The genus is placed alone in family Sphenocleaceae. The position of the family is somewhat uncertain; it is now usually placed in Solanales, but it has previously been placed in Asterales, especially near Campanulaceae, and there is some evidence to support this.
