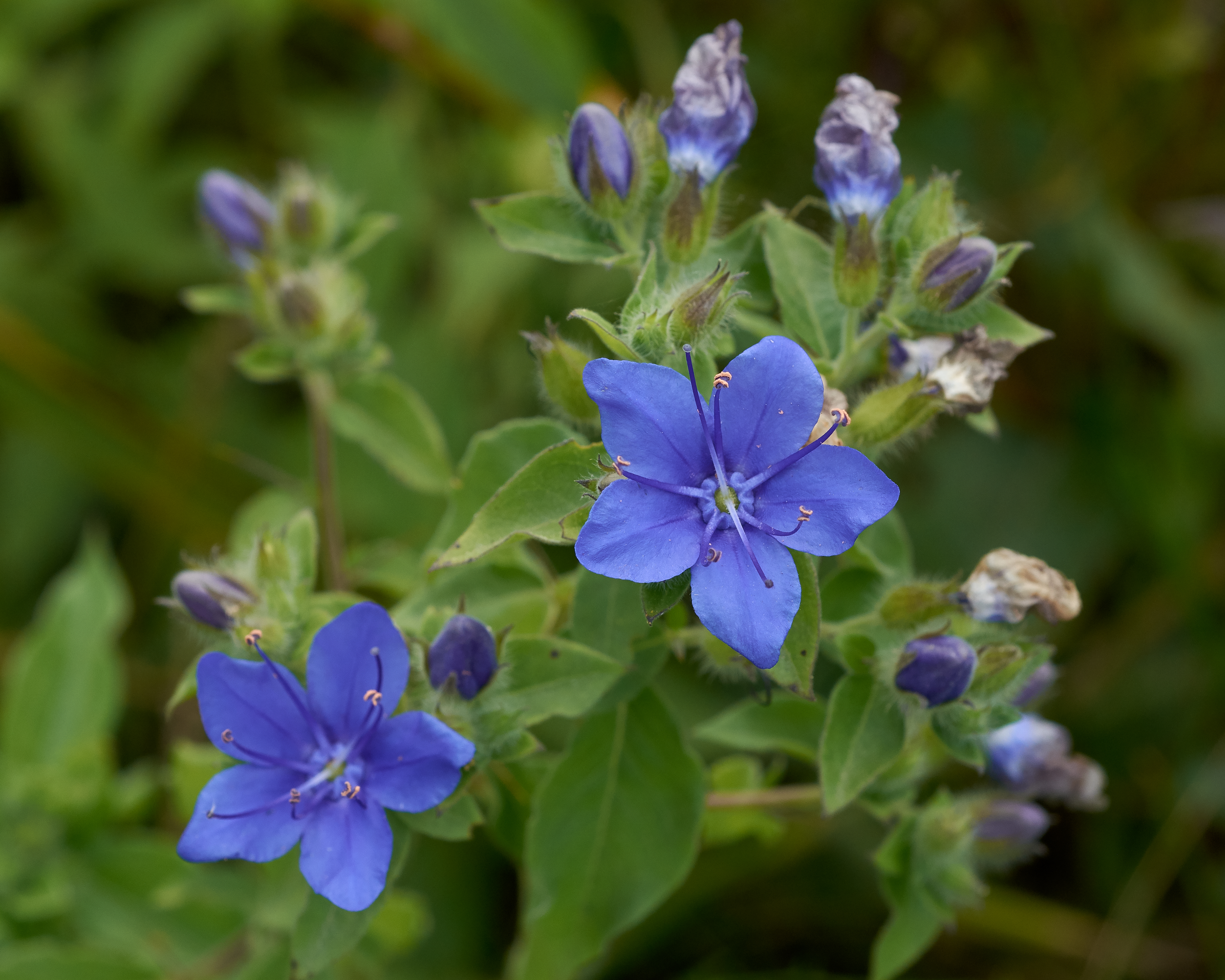
- Hydrolea ovata

Scientific classification
- Kingdom: Plantae
- Clade: Tracheophytes
- Clade: Angiosperms
- Clade: Eudicots
- Clade: Asterids
- Order: Solanales
- Family: Hydroleaceae; R.Br. ex Edwards
- Genus: Hydrolea; L.

Species
- H. brevistyla H. corymbosa H. elatior H. floribunda H. macrosepala H. nigricaulis H. ovata H. palustris H. prostrata H. quadrivalvis H. sansibarica H. spinosa H. uniflora H. zeylanica

= Hydrolea =

Genus of flowering plants

Hydrolea (false fiddleleaf) is the only genus of the family Hydroleaceae of the order Solanales.

== Synonyms ==
- H. capsularis synonym for Hydrolea spinosa L.
- H. glabra synonym for Hydrolea spinosa L.
- H. prostrata synonym for Hydrolea zeylanica (L.) Vahl

== Species ==
, Plants of the World Online accepts the following species:

- Hydrolea brevistyla Verdc.
- Hydrolea corymbosa Elliott
- Hydrolea elatior Schott
- Hydrolea floribunda Kotschy & Peyr.
- Hydrolea macrosepala A.W.Benn.
- Hydrolea nigricaulis C.Wright ex Griseb.
- Hydrolea ovata Nutt.
- Hydrolea palustris (Aubl.) Forsyth f.
- Hydrolea prostrata Exell
- Hydrolea quadrivalvis Walter
- Hydrolea sansibarica Gilg
- Hydrolea spinosa L.
- Hydrolea uniflora Raf.
- Hydrolea zeylanica (L.) Vahl
