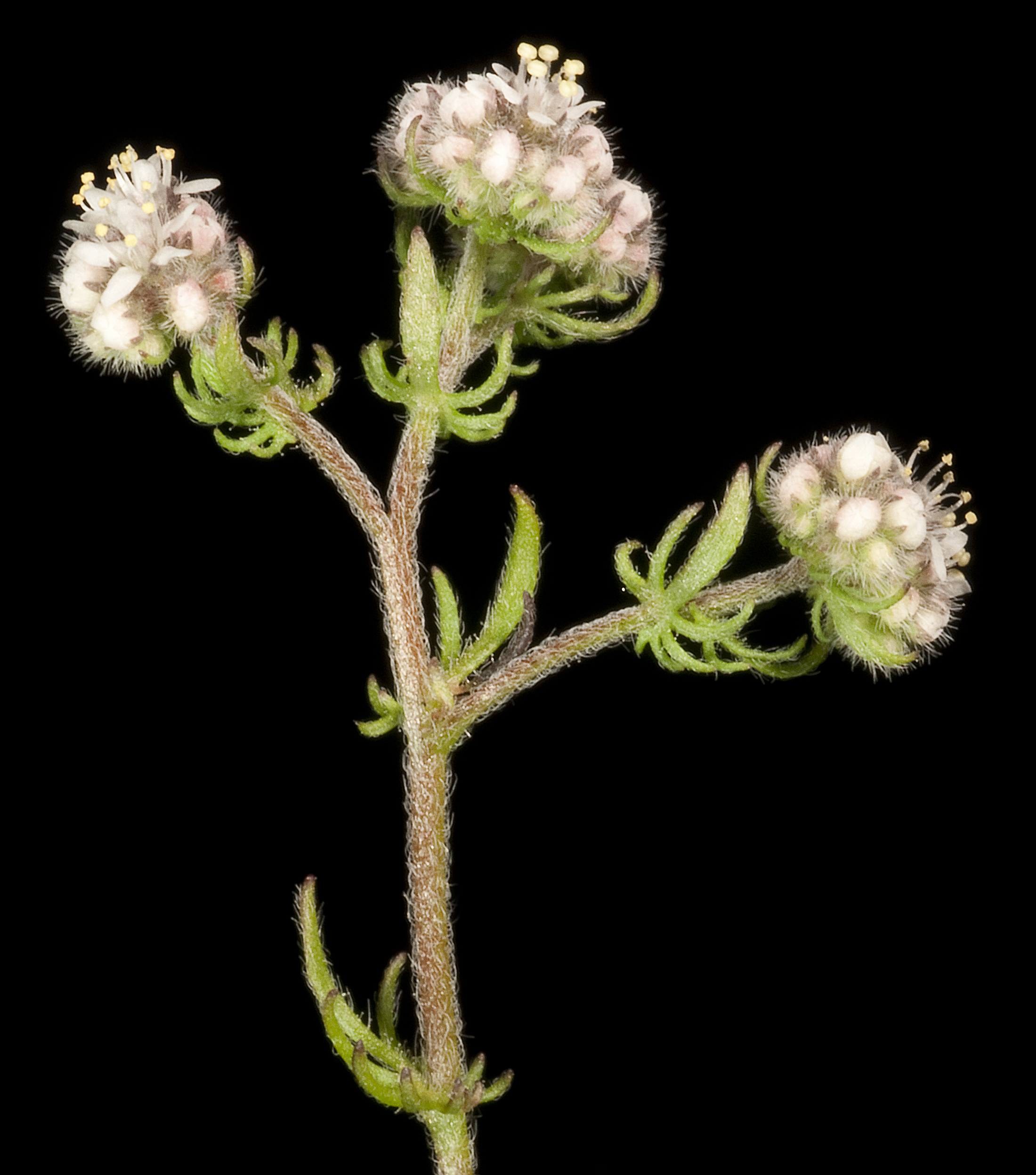

Scientific classification
- Kingdom: Plantae
- Clade: Tracheophytes
- Clade: Angiosperms
- Clade: Eudicots
- Clade: Asterids
- Order: Escalloniales
- Family: Escalloniaceae
- Genus: Eremosyne; Endl.
- Species: E. pectinata

Binomial name
- Eremosyne pectinata Endl.

= Eremosyne =

Genus of flowering plants

Eremosyne pectinata, the sole species in the genus Eremosyne, is an annual herb endemic to the south coast of Western Australia.

== Taxonomy ==
Historically it was placed in the Saxifragaceae family. It was placed in its own family, Eremosynaceae, under the Cronquist system; later merged into Escalloniaceae; before being restored to Eremosynaceae in the APG II system. Recent studies have confirmed its affinity with Escalloniaceae, and the Angiosperm Phylogeny Website now includes it in that family.

== Distribution and habitat ==
Eremosyne pectinata is largely confined to the Warren region of the Southwest Botanic Province of Western Australia.
