= APG II system =

System of plant taxonomy

The APG II system (Angiosperm Phylogeny Group II system) of plant classification is the second, now obsolete, version of a modern, mostly molecular-based, system of plant taxonomy that was published in April 2003 by the Angiosperm Phylogeny Group. It was a revision of the first APG system, published in 1998, and was superseded in 2009 by a further revision, the APG III system.

== History ==
APG II was published as:

- Angiosperm Phylogeny Group (2003). "An update of the Angiosperm Phylogeny Group classification for the orders and families of flowering plants: APG II". Botanical Journal of the Linnean Society 141(4): 399-436. (Available online: Abstract | Full text (HTML) | Full text (PDF) doi: 10.1046/j.1095-8339.2003.t01-1-00158.x)

Each of the APG systems represents the broad consensus of a number of systematic botanists, united in the APG, working at several institutions worldwide.

The APG II system recognized 45 orders, five more than the APG system. The new orders were Austrobaileyales, Canellales, Gunnerales, Celastrales, and Crossosomatales, all of which were families unplaced as to order, although contained in supra-ordinal clades, in the APG system. APG II recognized 457 families, five fewer than the APG system. Thirty-nine of the APG II families were not placed in any order, but 36 of the 39 were placed in a supra-ordinal clade within the angiosperms. Fifty-five of the families came to be known as "bracketed families". They were optional segregates of families that could be circumscribed in a larger sense.

The APG II system was influential and was adopted in whole or in part (sometimes with modifications) in a number of references. It was superseded 6½ years later by the APG III system, published in October 2009.

== Groups ==
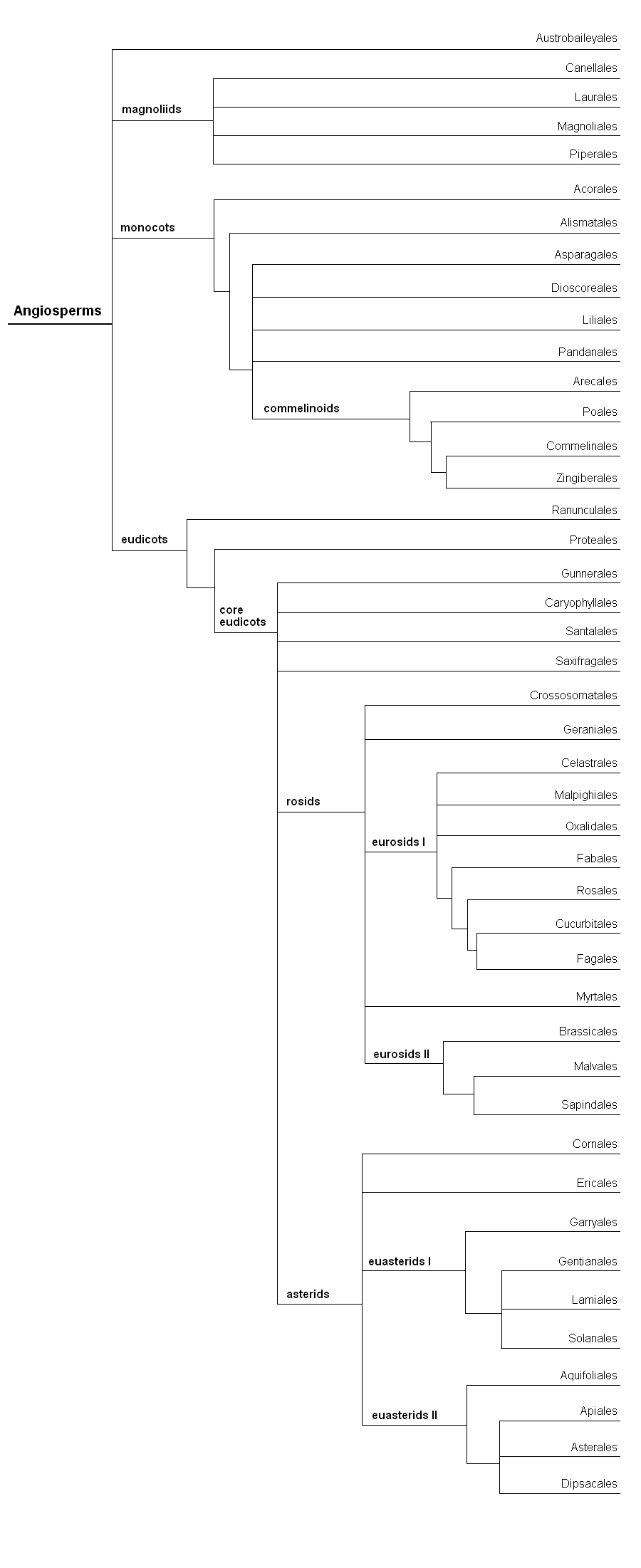
Cladogram showing the relationships, but excluding taxa not placed within an order

Main groups in the system (all unranked clades between the ranks of class and order):

- angiosperms :
  magnoliids
  monocots
  commelinids
  eudicots
  core eudicots
  rosids
  eurosids I
  eurosids II
  asterids
  euasterids I
  euasterids II

Shown below is the classification in full detail, except for the fifteen genera and three families that were unplaced in APG II. The unplaced taxa were listed at the end of the appendix in a section entitled "Taxa of Uncertain Position". Under some of the clades are listed the families that were placed incertae sedis in that clade. Thirty-six families were so placed. This means that their relationship to other members of the clade is not known.

- angiosperms :
  paraphyletic grade basal angiosperms
  family Amborellaceae
  family Chloranthaceae
  family Nymphaeaceae [+ family Cabombaceae]
  order Austrobaileyales
  order Ceratophyllales
  clade magnoliids
  order Canellales
  order Laurales
  order Magnoliales
  order Piperales
  clade monocots
  family Petrosaviaceae
  order Acorales
  order Alismatales
  order Asparagales
  order Dioscoreales
  order Liliales
  order Pandanales
  clade commelinids
  family Dasypogonaceae
  order Arecales
  order Commelinales
  order Poales
  order Zingiberales
  clade eudicots
  family Buxaceae [+ family Didymelaceae]
  family Sabiaceae
  family Trochodendraceae [+ family Tetracentraceae]
  order Proteales
  order Ranunculales
  clade core eudicots
  family Aextoxicaceae
  family Berberidopsidaceae
  family Dilleniaceae
  order Gunnerales
  order Caryophyllales
  order Santalales
  order Saxifragales
  clade rosids
  family Aphloiaceae
  family Geissolomataceae
  family Ixerbaceae
  family Picramniaceae
  family Strasburgeriaceae
  family Vitaceae
  order Crossosomatales
  order Geraniales
  order Myrtales
  clade eurosids I
  family Zygophyllaceae [+ family Krameriaceae]
  family Huaceae
  order Celastrales
  order Cucurbitales
  order Fabales
  order Fagales
  order Malpighiales
  order Oxalidales
  order Rosales
  clade eurosids II
  family Tapisciaceae
  order Brassicales
  order Malvales
  order Sapindales
  clade asterids
  order Cornales
  order Ericales
  clade euasterids I
  family Boraginaceae
  family Icacinaceae
  family Oncothecaceae
  family Vahliaceae
  order Garryales
  order Gentianales
  order Lamiales
  order Solanales
  clade euasterids II
  family Bruniaceae
  family Columelliaceae [+ family Desfontainiaceae]
  family Eremosynaceae
  family Escalloniaceae
  family Paracryphiaceae
  family Polyosmaceae
  family Sphenostemonaceae
  family Tribelaceae
  order Apiales
  order Aquifoliales
  order Asterales
  order Dipsacales

Note: "+ ..." = optionally separate family, that may be split off from the preceding family.
