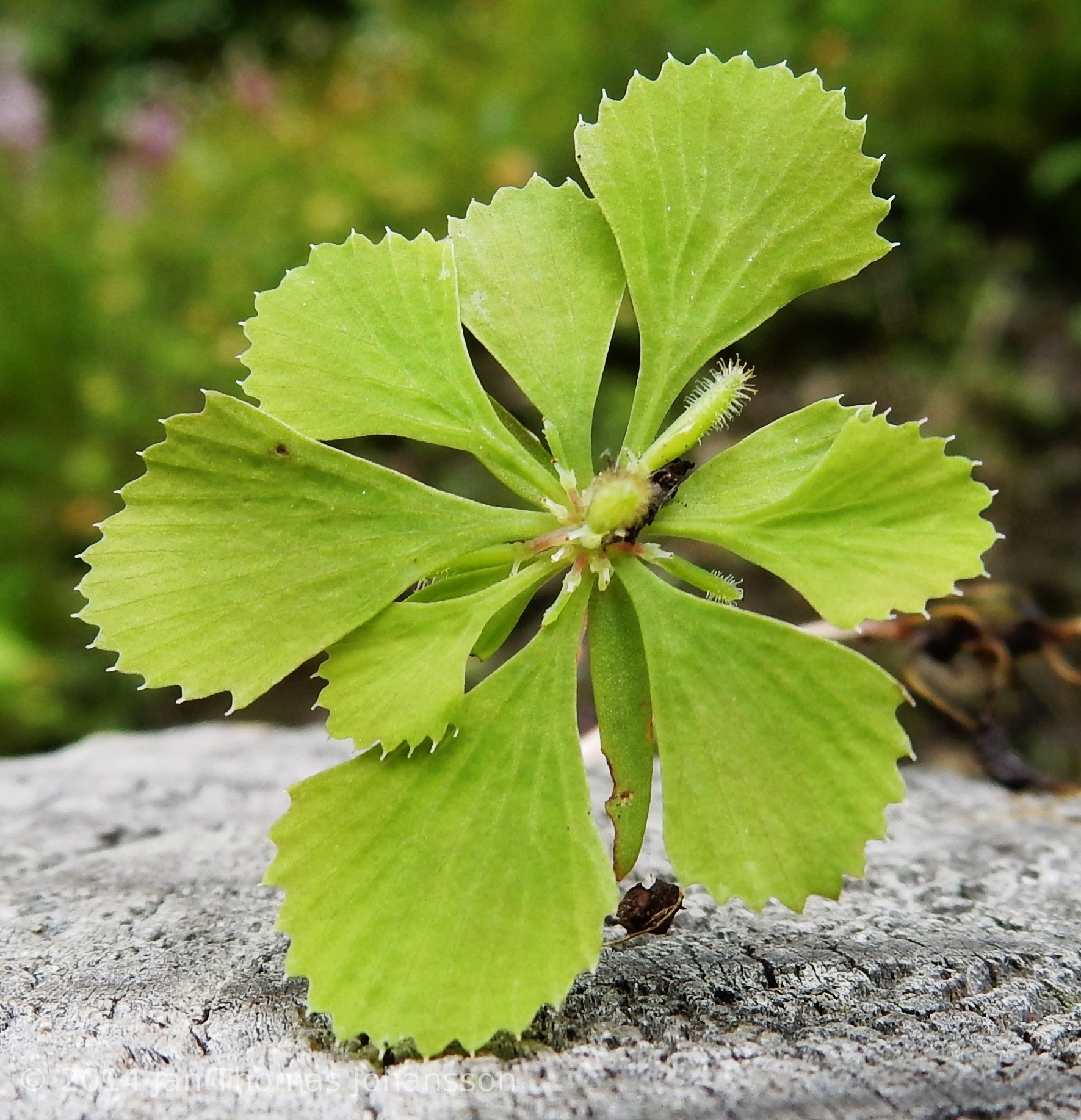
- Circaeaster agrestis in Yunnan, China

Scientific classification
- Kingdom: Plantae
- Clade: Tracheophytes
- Clade: Angiosperms
- Clade: Eudicots
- Order: Ranunculales
- Family: Circaeasteraceae
- Genus: Circaeaster; Maxim.
- Species: C. agrestis

Binomial name
- Circaeaster agrestis Maxim.

= Circaeaster =

Genus of flowering plants

Circaeaster agrestis is a flowering plant species and one of only one to two species in its family, the Circaeasteraceae. The plant is a small, glabrous herb found in temperate zones from the northwest Himalaya to northwest China.
