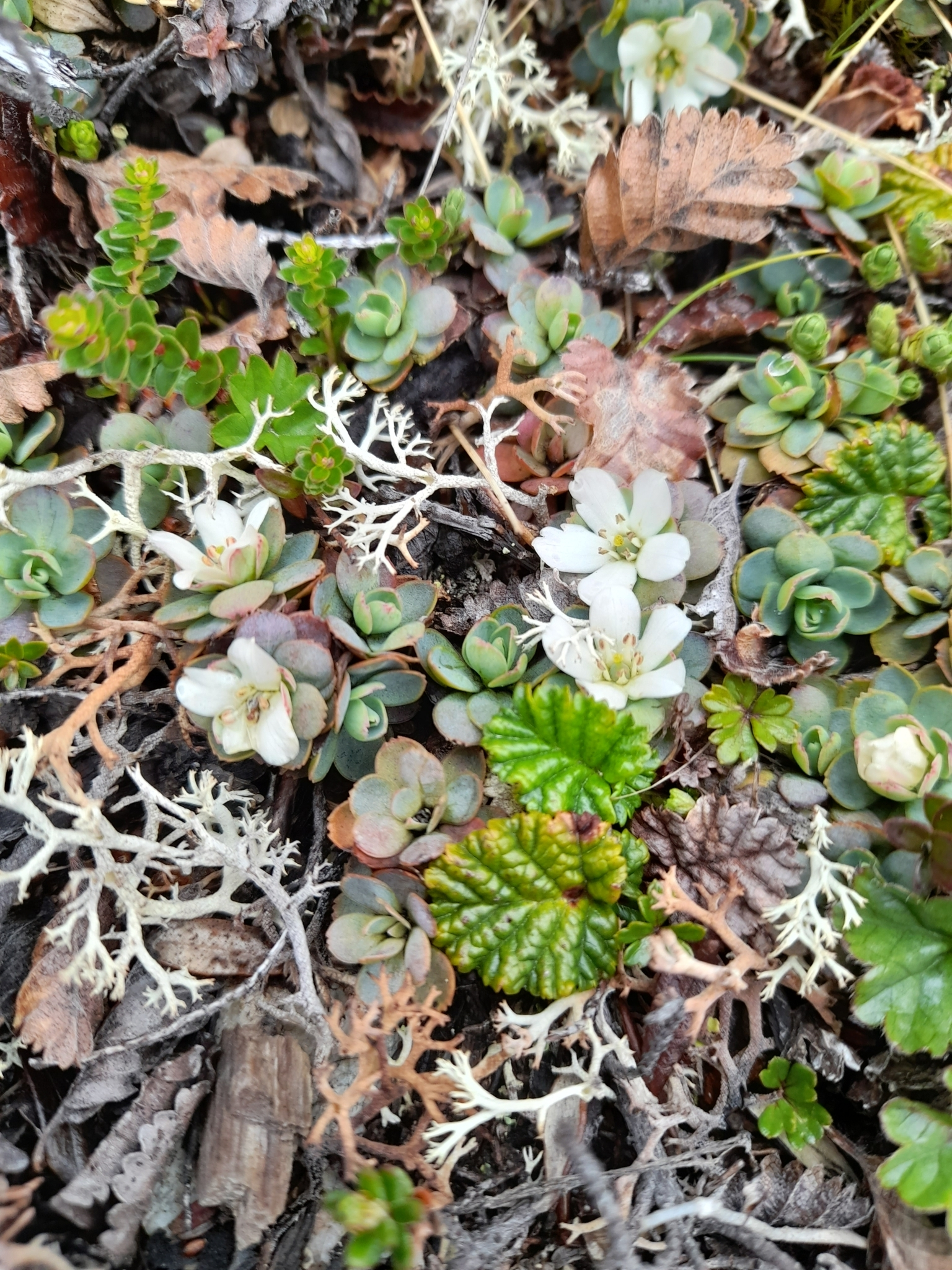
- Tribeles australis in Argentina

Scientific classification
- Kingdom: Plantae
- Clade: Tracheophytes
- Clade: Angiosperms
- Clade: Eudicots
- Clade: Asterids
- Order: Escalloniales
- Family: Escalloniaceae
- Genus: Tribeles; Phil.
- Species: T. australis

Binomial name
- Tribeles australis Phil.

= Tribeles =

Species of plant

Tribeles australis, the sole species in the genus Tribeles, is a prostrate shrub native to Chile and Argentina.

== Taxonomy ==
Historically it was placed alone in family Tribelaceae. This was placed in the Hydrangeales by Takhtajan, but the APG II system placed it in the Euasterids II clade (campanulids) unplaced as to order. More recent work has provided evidence that Tribeles arose from within the ranks of Escalloniaceae, so the Angiosperm Phylogeny Website recommends placing it there, and treating Tribelaceae as a synonym of Escalloniaceae.
