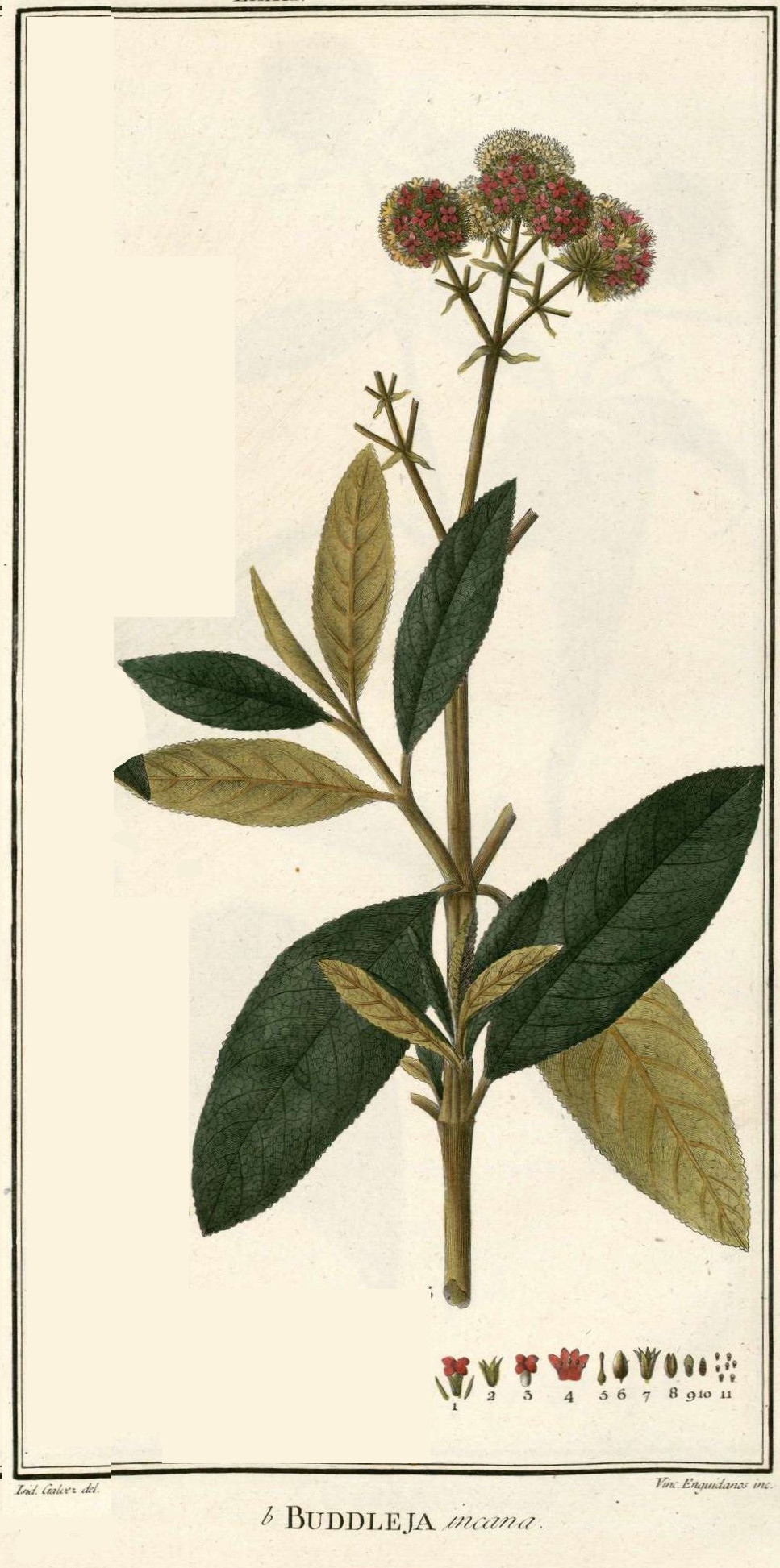

Conservation status
- Least Concern (IUCN 3.1)

Scientific classification
- Kingdom: Plantae
- Clade: Tracheophytes
- Clade: Angiosperms
- Clade: Eudicots
- Clade: Asterids
- Order: Lamiales
- Family: Scrophulariaceae
- Genus: Buddleja
- Species: B. incana

Binomial name
- Buddleja incana Ruiz & Pav.

Synonyms
- Buddleja incana var. pannulosa Diels; Buddleja rondeletiiflora Benth.; Buddleja rugosa Kunth; Nicodemia rondeletiiflora (Benth.) Benth.; Nicodemia rondeletiiflora var. acuminata Aug.DC.

= Buddleja incana =

Species of tree

Buddleja incana is a species of shrub or tree in the family Scrophulariaceae. It is native to the Andes.

== Description ==
Buddleja incana is a dioecious tree or shrub, 4 – 15 m tall, the trunk < 50 cm at the base, the bark brownish and furrowed. The branches are subquadrangular and tomentose, and form a rounded crown. The coriaceous leaves are mostly oblong, 7 – 21 cm long by 1 – 5 cm wide, the upper surface glabrescent, often bullate or rugose, the lower white or yellowish tomentose. The yellow to orange paniculate inflorescences have 2 – 3 orders of leafy-bracted branches bearing heads 1 – 1.5 cm in diameter, each with 15 – 40 flowers, the corollas 3 – 4 mm long. Ploidy: 2n = 76.

== Distribution and habitat ==
Buddleja incana is present in Bolivia, Peru, Ecuador and Colombia, growing in canyon bottoms along streams at elevations of 2,700 – 4,500 m.

== Vernacular names ==
Buddleja incana is called kiswar in Quechua, kiswara in Aymara, quishuar in Spanish.

== Uses ==
The leaves are used in folk medicine against toothache and as diuretic.
