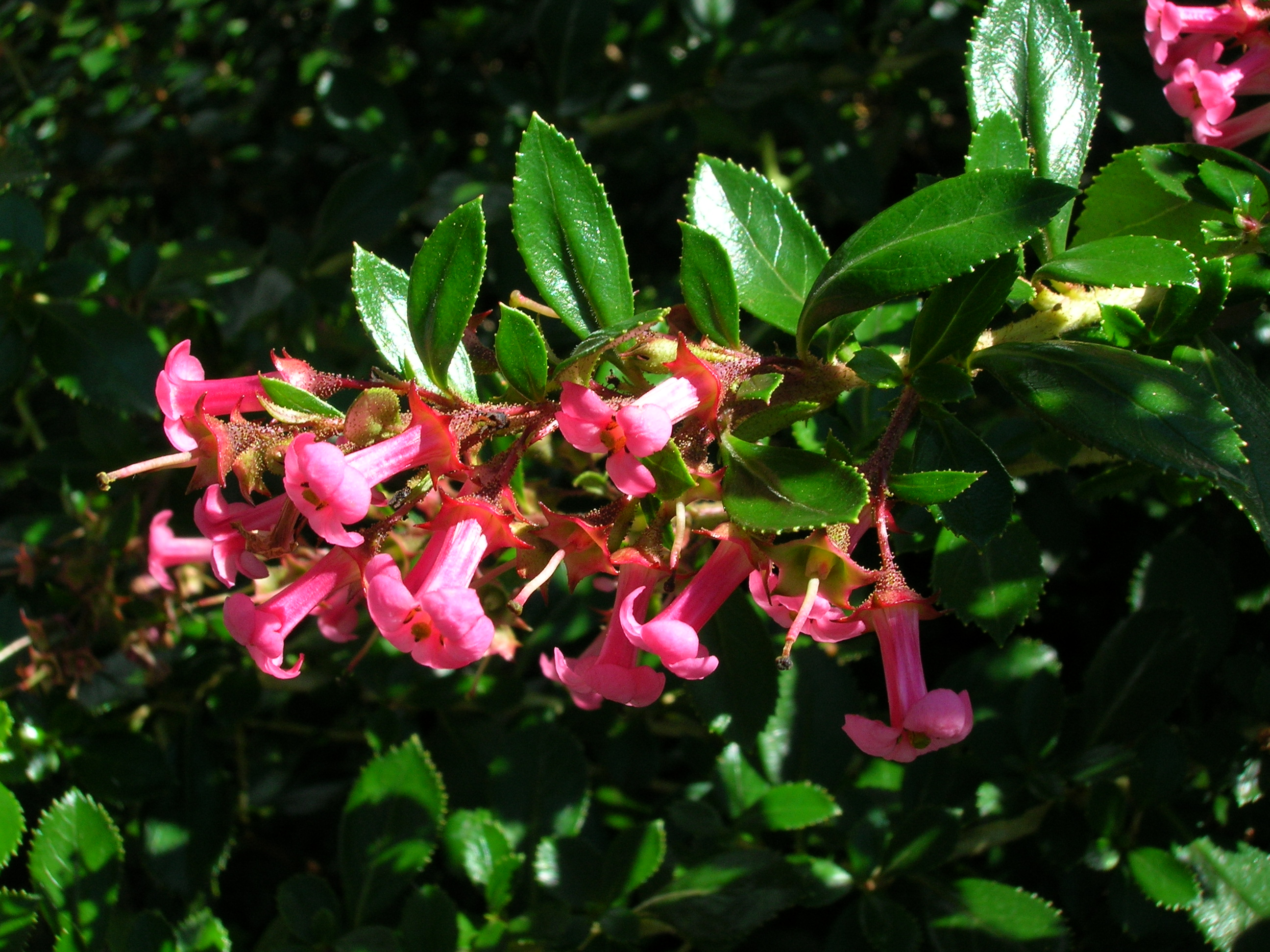
- Escallonia rubra var. macrantha

Scientific classification
- Kingdom: Plantae
- Clade: Tracheophytes
- Clade: Angiosperms
- Clade: Eudicots
- Clade: Asterids
- Order: Escalloniales; Mart.
- Family: Escalloniaceae; R.Br. ex Dumort.

Genera
- See text

= Escalloniaceae =

Family of flowering plants

Escalloniaceae is a family of flowering plants consisting of about 130 species in eight genera. In the APG II system it is one of eight families in the euasterids II clade (campanulids) that are unplaced as to order. More recent research has provided evidence that two of those families, Eremosynaceae and Tribelaceae, arose from within Escalloniaceae; the Angiosperm Phylogeny Website therefore merges these two families into Escalloniaceae, and also places the family alone in order Escalloniales.

== Genera ==
As of 11 November 2023, the Plants of the World Online taxonomic database recognises eight genera in this family, as follows:

- Anopterus Labill.
- Eremosyne Endl.
- Escallonia Mutis ex L.f.
- Forgesia Comm. ex Juss.
- Polyosma Blume
- Rayenia Menegoz & Villarroel
- Tribeles Phil.
- Valdivia J.Rémy
