= Jules Rémy =

French botanist (1826–1893)

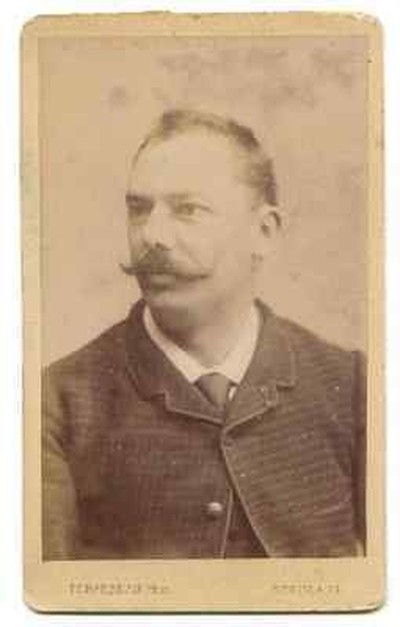
Jules Rémy

Ézéchiel Jules Rémy (1826–1893) was a French naturalist and traveller.

He was born in Mourmelon-le-Grand on 3 September 1826 and died in Louvercy on 2 December 1893. Rémy made collections of botanical and geological specimens, shells, and published works on his journeys and observations, including an early record of a visit to the island of Molokai and a report on the Mormon people of Utah.

The standard author citation for this botanist is J.Rémy.
