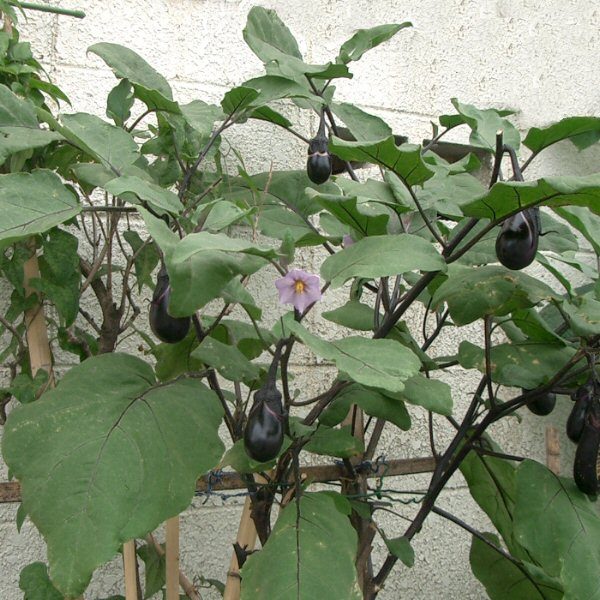
- Solanum melongena (Aubergine)

Scientific classification
- Kingdom: Plantae
- Clade: Tracheophytes
- Clade: Angiosperms
- Clade: Eudicots
- Clade: Asterids
- Clade: Lamiids
- Order: Solanales; Juss. ex Bercht. & J.Presl, 1820

Families
- Convolvulaceae; Hydroleaceae; Montiniaceae; Solanaceae; Sphenocleaceae

= Solanales =

Order of dicot flowering plants

The Solanales are an order of flowering plants in the asterid group of the eudicots. Well-known members of Solanales include potatoes, sweet potatoes, eggplants, tomatoes, chili peppers, tobacco, petunias, nightshades, and morning glory. Some older sources used the name Polemoniales for this order.

== Taxonomy ==
The following families are included here in newer systems such as that of the Angiosperm Phylogeny Group (APG):

- Family Solanaceae (nightshade family; includes Nolanaceae as well as potatoes, eggplants, tomatoes, chili peppers, tobacco, and petunias)
- Family Convolvulaceae (morning glory and sweet potato)
- Family Montiniaceae
- Family Sphenocleaceae
- Family Hydroleaceae

The APG II classification treats the Solanales in the group Euasterids I.

Under the older Cronquist system, the latter three families were placed elsewhere, and a number of others were included:

- Family Duckeodendraceae (now treated as a synonym of Solanaceae)
- Family Nolanaceae (now treated as a synonym of Solanaceae)
- Family Cuscutaceae (now treated as a synonym of Convolvulaceae)
- Family Retziaceae (now treated as a synonym of Stilbaceae, order Lamiales)
- Family Menyanthaceae (now placed in order Asterales)
- Family Polemoniaceae (now placed in order Ericales)
- Family Hydrophyllaceae (now placed in order Boraginales)

In the classification system of Dahlgren the Solanales were in the superorder Solaniflorae (also called Solananae).
