= Afrotropical realm =

One of Earth's eight biogeographic realms

The Afrotropical realm (in blue)

The Afrotropical realm is one of the Earth's eight biogeographic realms. It includes sub-Saharan Africa, the southern Arabian Peninsula, the island of Madagascar, and the islands of the western Indian Ocean. It was formerly known as the Ethiopian Zone or Ethiopian Region.

== Major ecological regions ==
The outlined ecoregions of the Afrotropical realm, each of a colored biome. Note that this realm has 9 of 14 biomes, or major habitat types, as defined by Olson & Dinerstein, et al. (2001).: 01. Tropical and subtropical moist broadleaf forests; 02. Tropical and subtropical dry broadleaf forests; 03. Tropical and subtropical coniferous forests; 04. Temperate broadleaf and mixed forests; 05. Temperate coniferous forests; 06. Taiga and Boreal forest; 07. Tropical and subtropical grasslands, savannas, and shrublands; 08. Temperate grasslands, savannas, and shrublands; 09. Flooded grasslands and savannas; 10. Montane grasslands and shrublands; 11. Tundra; 12. Mediterranean forests, woodlands, and scrub; 13. Deserts and xeric shrublands; 14. Mangroves; Rock and Ice, or Abiotic Land Zones

Most of the Afrotropical realm, except for Africa's southern tip, has a tropical climate. A broad belt of deserts, including the Atlantic and Sahara deserts of northern Africa and the Arabian Desert of the Arabian Peninsula, separates the Afrotropic from the Palearctic realm, which includes northern Africa and temperate Eurasia.

=== Sahel and Sudan ===
South of the Sahara, two belts of tropical grassland and savanna run east and west across the continent, from the Atlantic Ocean to the Ethiopian Highlands. Immediately south of the Sahara lies the Sahel belt, a transitional zone of semi-arid short grassland and vachellia savanna. Rainfall increases further south in the Sudanian Savanna, also known simply as the Sudan region, a belt of taller grasslands and savannas. The Sudanian Savanna is home to two great flooded grasslands: the Sudd wetland in South Sudan, and the Niger Inland Delta in Mali. The forest-savanna mosaic is a transitional zone between the grasslands and the belt of tropical moist broadleaf forests near the equator.

=== Southern Arabian woodlands ===
South Arabia, which includes Yemen and parts of western Oman and southwestern Saudi Arabia, has few permanent forests. Some of the notable ones are Jabal Bura, Jabal Raymah, and Jabal Badaj in the Yemeni highland escarpment and the seasonal forests in eastern Yemen and the Dhofar region of Oman. Other woodlands that scatter the land are small, predominantly Juniperus or Vachellia forests.

=== Forest zone ===
The forest zone, a belt of lowland tropical moist broadleaf forests, runs across most of equatorial Africa's Intertropical Convergence Zone. The Upper Guinean forests of West Africa extend along the coast from Guinea to Togo. The Dahomey Gap, a zone of forest-savanna mosaic that reaches to the coast, separates the Upper Guinean forests from the Lower Guinean forests, which extend along the Gulf of Guinea from eastern Benin through Cameroon and Gabon to the western Democratic Republic of the Congo. The largest tropical forest zone in Africa is the Congolian forests of the Congo Basin in Central Africa.

A belt of tropical moist broadleaf forest also runs along the Indian Ocean coast, from southern Somalia to South Africa.

=== Somali–Masai region ===
In northeastern Africa, semi-arid Acacia-Commiphora woodlands, savannas, and bushlands are the dominant plant communities. This region is called the Somali-Masai center of endemism or Somali-Masai region. It extends from central Tanzania northwards through the Horn of Africa and covers portions of Tanzania, Kenya, Ethiopia, Somalia, Djibouti, and Eritrea. Thorny, dry-season deciduous species of Vachellia and Senegalia (formerly Acacia) and Commiphora are the dominant trees, growing in open-canopied woodlands, open savannas, dense bushlands, and thickets. This region includes the Serengeti ecosystem, which is renowned for its wildlife.

=== Eastern Africa's highlands ===
The Afromontane region extends from the Ethiopian Highlands to the Drakensberg Mountains of South Africa, including the East African Rift. This region is home to distinctive flora, including Podocarpus and Afrocarpus, as well as giant Lobelias and Senecios.

- Ethiopian Highlands
- Albertine rift montane forests
- East African montane forests and Eastern Arc forests

=== Zambezian region ===
The Zambezian region includes woodlands, savannas, grasslands, and thickets. Characteristic plant communities include Miombo woodlands, drier mopane and Baikiaea woodlands, and higher-elevation Bushveld. It extends from east to west in a broad belt across the continent, south of the rainforests of the Guineo-Congolian region, and north of the deserts of southeastern Africa, the countries are Malawi, Angola, Botswana, Mozambique, Zambia, and Zimbabwe, and the subtropical.

=== Deserts of Southern Africa ===
Southern Africa as described in Plant Taxonomic Database Standards No. 2. Approximate locations of deserts are overlaid in red.

Southern Africa contains several deserts. The Namib Desert is one of the oldest deserts in the world and extends for over 2,000 kilometers along the Atlantic coasts of Angola, Namibia, and South Africa. It is characterized by towering dunes and a diversity of endemic wildlife. Further inland concerning the Namib Desert, the Kalahari Desert is a semi-arid savanna spanning Botswana, Namibia, and South Africa. The Kalahari is known for its diversity of mineral resources, particularly diamonds, as well as a variety of flora. South of the Namib and Kalahari deserts is the Karoo. A semi-desert natural region, the Karoo desert spans across parts of the Western and Eastern Cape in South Africa and contains vast open spaces and unique vegetation, such as certain species of Asteraceae flowering plants. Within the boundaries of the larger Karoo, the Tankwa Karoo is a more arid sub-region known for harsher conditions and starker landscapes. Further to the west, the Richtersveld, a mountainous desert in the northwestern corner of South Africa, presents a rugged landscape. It is celebrated as a UNESCO World Heritage Site for its unique biodiversity and cultural significance to the local Nama people.

=== Cape floristic region ===
The Cape floristic region at Africa's southern tip is a Mediterranean climate region that is home to a significant number of endemic taxa, as well as to plant families like the proteas (Proteaceae) that are also found in the Australasian realm.

=== Madagascar and the Indian Ocean islands ===
Madagascar and neighboring islands form a distinctive sub-region of the realm, with numerous endemic taxa, such as lemurs. Madagascar and the Granitic Seychelles are old pieces of the ancient supercontinent of Gondwana, and broke away from Africa millions of years ago. Other Indian Ocean islands, like the Comoros and Mascarene Islands, are volcanic islands that formed more recently. Madagascar contains various plant habitats, from rainforests to mountains and deserts, as its biodiversity and ratio of endemism are extremely high.

== Endemic plants and animals ==
=== Plants ===
The Afrotropical realm is home to several endemic plant families. Madagascar and the Indian Ocean Islands are home to ten endemic families of flowering plants; eight are endemic to Madagascar (Asteropeiaceae, Didymelaceae, Didiereaceae, Kaliphoraceae, Melanophyllaceae, Physenaceae, Sarcolaenaceae, and Sphaerosepalaceae), one to Seychelles (Medusagynaceae), and one to the Mascarene Islands (Psiloxylaceae). Twelve plant families are endemic or nearly endemic to South Africa (including Curtisiaceae, Heteropyxidaceae, Penaeaceae, Psiloxylaceae, and Rhynchocalycaceae) of which five are endemic to the Cape floristic province (including Grubbiaceae). Other endemic Afrotropic families include Barbeyaceae, Dirachmaceae, Montiniaceae, Myrothamnaceae, and Oliniaceae.

=== Animals ===
The East African Great Lakes (Victoria, Malawi, and Tanganyika) are the center of biodiversity of many freshwater fishes, especially cichlids (they harbor more than two-thirds of the estimated 2,000 species in the family). The West African coastal rivers region covers only a fraction of West Africa, but harbors 322 of West Africa's fish species, with 247 restricted to this area and 129 restricted even to smaller ranges. The central rivers fauna comprise 194 fish species, with 119 endemics and only 33 restricted to small areas.

The Afrotropic has various endemic bird families, including ostriches (Struthionidae), the secretary bird (Sagittariidae), guineafowl (Numididae), and mousebirds (Coliidae). Several families of passerines are limited to the Afrotropics, including rock-jumpers (Chaetopidae) and rockfowl (Picathartidae).

Africa has three endemic orders of mammals, the Tubulidentata (aardvarks), Afrosoricida (tenrecs and golden moles), and Macroscelidea (elephant shrews). The East-African plains are well known for their diversity of large mammals.

Four species of great apes (Hominidae) are endemic to Central Africa: both species of gorilla (western gorilla, Gorilla gorilla, and eastern gorilla, Gorilla beringei) and both species of chimpanzee (common chimpanzee, Pan troglodytes, and bonobo, Pan paniscus). Humans and their ancestors originated in Africa.

== Habitats ==
The tropical environment is rich in terms of biodiversity. Tropical African forest is 18 percent of the world's total and covers over 3.6 million square kilometers of land in West, East, and Central Africa. This total area can be subdivided to 2.69 million square kilometers (74%) in Central Africa, 680,000 square kilometers (19%) in West Africa, and 250,000 square kilometers (7%) in East Africa. In West Africa, a chain of rain forests up to 350 km long extends from the eastern border of Sierra Leone to Ghana. In Ghana, the forest zone gradually dispels near the Volta River, following a 300 km stretch of Dahomey savanna gap. The rain forest of West Africa continues from east of Benin through southern Nigeria and officially ends at the border of Cameroon along the Sanaga River.

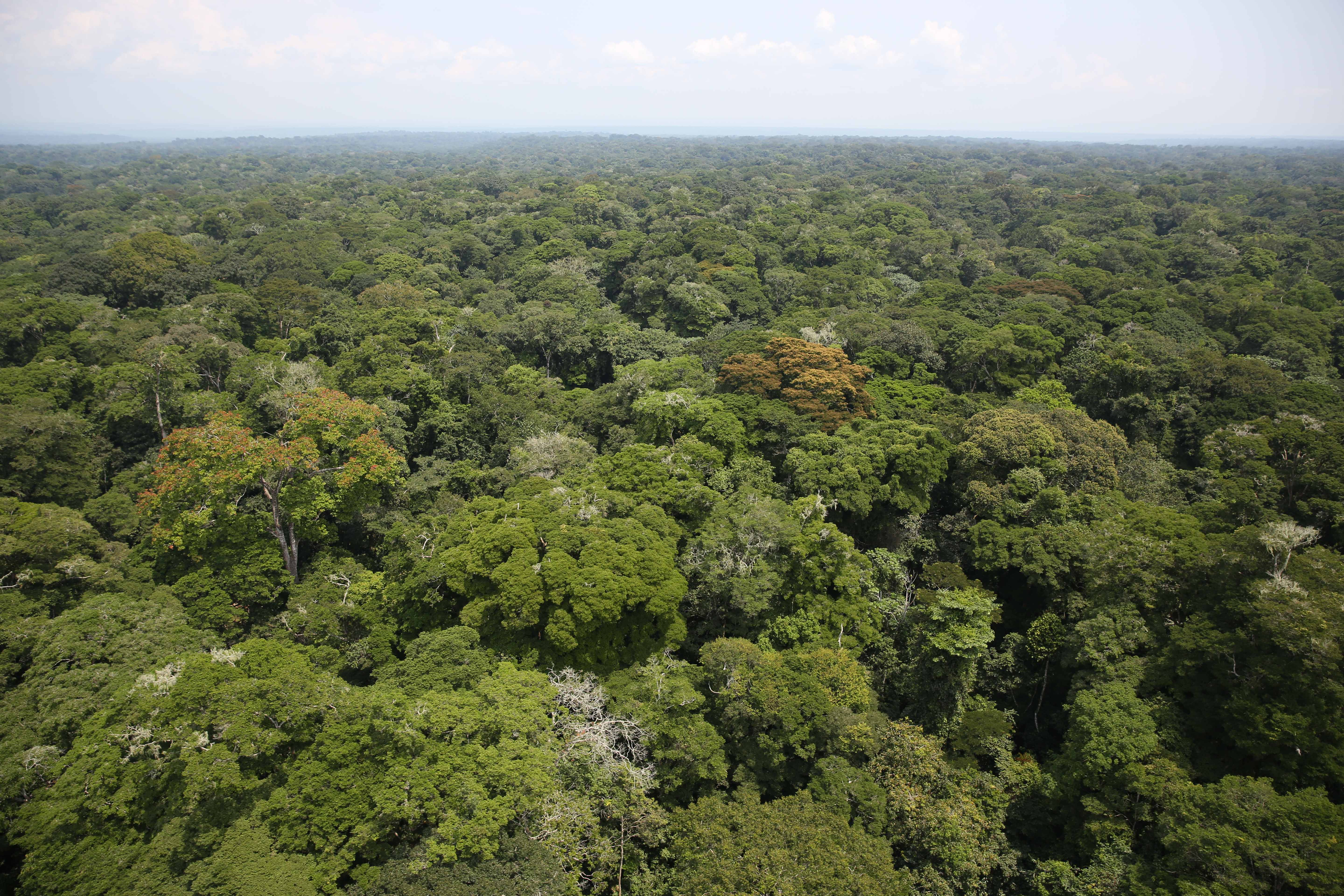
Ituri Rainforest

Semi-deciduous rainforests in West Africa begin at the fringed coastline of Guinea Bissau (via Guinea) and run through the coasts of Sierra Leone, Liberia, Ivory Coast, Ghana, continuing through Togo, Benin, Nigeria and Cameroon, and ending at the Congo Basin. Rainforests such as these are the richest, oldest, most prolific, and most complex systems on Earth, are dying, and in turn, are upsetting the delicate ecological balance. This may disturb global hydrological cycles, release vast amounts of greenhouse gases into the atmosphere, and lessen the planet's ability to store excess carbon.

The rainforest vegetation of the Guinea-Congolian transition area, extending from Senegal to western Uganda is constituted of two main types: The semi-deciduous rainforest is characterized by a large number of trees whose leaves are left during the dry season. It appears in areas where the dry period (rainfall below about 100 mm) reaches three months. Then, the evergreen or the semi-evergreen rainforest climatically adapted to somewhat more humid conditions than the semi-deciduous type and is usually there in areas where the dry period is shorter than two months. This forest is usually richer in legumes and a variety of species and its maximum development is around the Bight of Biafra, from Eastern Nigeria to Gabon, and with some large patches leaning to the west from Ghana to Liberia and to the east of Zaïre-Congo basin.

Among rainforest areas in other continents, most of the African rainforest is comparatively dry and receives between 1600 and 2000 mm of rainfall per year. Areas receiving more rain than this mainly are in coastal areas. The circulation of rainfall throughout the year remains less than in other rainforest regions in the world. The average monthly rainfall in nearly the whole region remains under 100 mm throughout the year. The variety of the African rainforest flora is also less than the other rainforests. This lack of flora has been credited to several reasons such as the gradual infertility since the Miocene, severe dry periods during Quaternary, or the refuge theory of the cool and dry climate of tropical Africa during the last severe ice age of about 18,000 years ago.

== Fauna ==
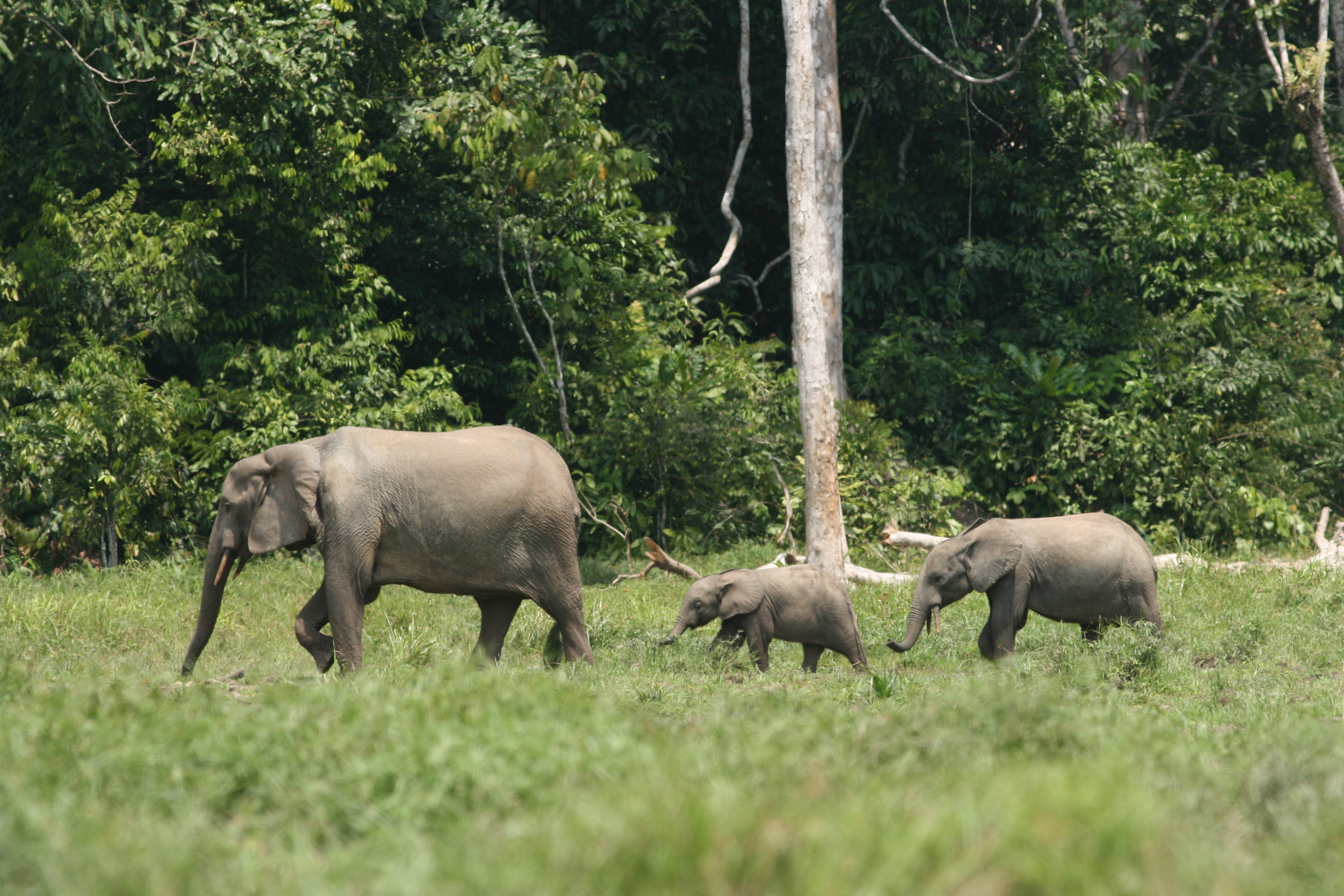
African forest elephant

The Tropical African rainforest has rich fauna, commonly smaller mammal species rarely seen by humans. New species are being discovered. For instance, in late 1988 an unknown shrub species was discovered on the shores of the Median River in Western Cameroon. Since then many species have become extinct. However, undisturbed rainforests are some of the richest habitats for animal species. Today, undisturbed rainforests are remnant but rare. Timber extraction not only changes the edifice of the forest, but it also affects the tree species spectrum by removing economically important species and terminating other species in the process. The species that compose African rainforests are of different evolutionary ages because of the contraction and expansion of the rainforest in response to global climatic fluctuations.

The pygmy hippopotamus, the giant forest hog, the water chevrotain, insectivores, rodents, bats, tree frogs, and bird species inhabit the forest. These species, along with a diversity of fruits and insects, make a special habitat that allows for a diversity of life. The top canopy is home to monkey species like the red colobus, Black-and-white Colobus, and many other Old-World monkey species. Many of these rare and unique species are endangered or critically endangered and need protection from poachers and provided ample habitat to thrive.

== Flora ==
In Tropical Africa, about 8,500 plant species have been documented, including 403 orchid species.

Species unfamiliar with the changes in forest structure for industrial use might not survive. If timber use continues and an increasing amount of farming occurs, it could lead to the mass killing of animal species. The home of nearly half of the world's animals and plant species are tropical rainforests. The rainforests provide economic resources for over-populated developing countries. Despite the stated need to save the West African forests, there are varied opinions on how best to accomplish this goal. In April 1992, countries with some of the largest surviving tropical rainforests banned a rainforest protection plan proposed by the British government. It aimed at finding endangered species of tropical trees to control their trade. Experts estimate that the rainforest of West Africa, at the present rate of deforestation, may disappear by the year 2020.

Africa's rainforest, like many others emergent in the world, has a special significance to the indigenous peoples of Africa who have occupied them for millennia.

== Region protection ==
Many African countries are in economic and political change, overwhelmed by conflict, making various movements of forest exploitation to maintain forest management and production more and more complicated.

Forest legislation of ATO member countries aims to promote the balanced utilization of the forest domain and of wildlife and fishery to increase the input of the forest sector to the economic, social, cultural, and scientific development of the country.

=== Deforestation ===
The rate of deforestation in Africa is less known than the rate of other tropical regions. A lack of dependable data and survey information in some countries has made change in areas of unbroken forest difficult to ascertain.

The cultivation of various cash crops has led to forest depletion. West African countries depend on products like gum, copal, rubber, cola nuts, and palm oil as a source of steady income. Land use change spoils entire habitats with the forests. The conversion of forests into timber is another cause of deforestation. Over decades, the primary forest product was commercial timber. Urbanized countries account for a great percentage of the world's wood consumption, which increased greatly between 1950 and 1980. Simultaneously, preservation measures were reinforced to protect European and American forests. Economic growth and growing environmental protection in industrialized European countries caused increased demand for tropical hardwood from West Africa. In the first half of the 1980s, an annual forest loss of 7,200 km^{2} (2,800 sq mi) was noted down along the Gulf of Guinea, a figure equivalent to 4-5 percent of the total remaining rainforest area. By 1985, 72% of West Africa's rainforests had been transformed into fallow lands and an additional 9% had been opened up by timber exploitation.

Tropical timber was used in Europe following World War II, as trade with East European countries stopped and timber noticeably became sparse in western and southern Europe. Despite efforts to promote lesser-known timber species use, the market continued to focus on part of the usable timber obtainable. West Africa was prone to selective harvesting practices; while conservationists blamed the timber industry and the farmers for felling trees, others believe rainforest destruction is connected to the problem of fuel wood. The contribution of fuel wood consumption to tree stock decline in Africa is believed to be significant. It is generally believed that firewood provides 75% of the energy used in sub-Sahara Africa. With the high demand, the consumption of wood for fuel exceeds the renewal of forest cover.

Other observed changes in these forests are forest disintegration (changing the spatial continuity and creating a mosaic of forest blocks and other land cover types), and selective logging of woody species for profitable purposes that affect the forest subfloor and the biodiversity.

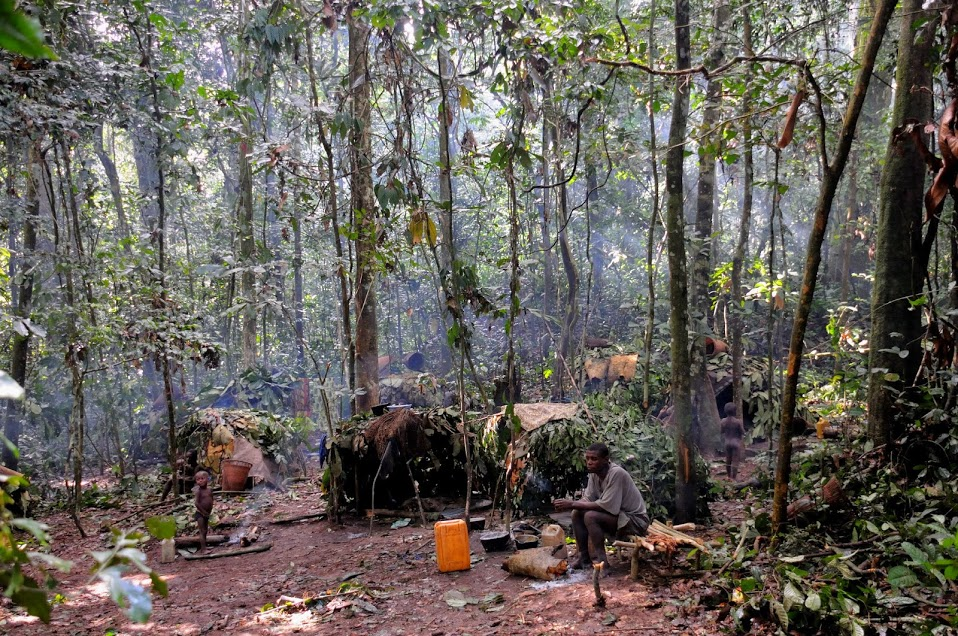
African Pygmies living in the Dzanga-Sangha Special Reserve

The rainforests that remain in West Africa now greatly differ in condition from their state 30 years ago. In Guinea, Liberia, and the Ivory Coast, there is almost no primary forest cover left unscathed; in Ghana, the situation is much worse, and nearly all of the rainforest is being removed. Guinea-Bissau loses 200 to 350 km^{2} (77 to 135 sq mi) of forest yearly, Senegal 500 km^{2} (190 sq mi) of wooded savanna, and Nigeria 6,000,050,000 of both. Liberia loses 800 km^{2} (310 sq mi) of forests each year. Extrapolating from present rates of loss, botanist Peter Raven pictures that the majority of the world's moderate and smaller rainforests (such as in Africa) could be destroyed in forty years. Tropical Africa comprises 18% of the world's total land area covering 20 million km^{2} (7.7 million sq mi) of land in West and Central Africa. The region has been facing deforestation in various degrees of intensity throughout the recent decades. The actual rate of deforestation varies from one country to another and accurate data does not exist yet. Recent estimates show that the annual pace of deforestation in the region can vary from 150 km^{2} (58 sq mi) in Gabon to 2,900 km^{2} (1,100 sq mi) in Côte d'Ivoire. The remaining tropical forests still cover major areas in Central Africa but are abridged by patches in West Africa.

The African Timber Organization member countries eventually recognized the cooperation between rural people and their forest environment. Customary law gives residents the right to use trees for firewood, fell trees for construction, and collect of forest products and rights for hunting or fishing and grazing or clearing of forests for maintenance agriculture. Other areas are called "protected forests", which means that uncontrolled clearings and unauthorized logging are forbidden. After World War II, commercial exploitation increased until no West African forestry department was able to make the law. By comparison with rainforests in other places of the world in 1973, Africa showed the greatest infringement though in total volume means, African timber production accounted for just one-third compared to that of Asia. The difference was due to the variety of trees in Africa forests and the demand for specific wood types in Europe.

Forestry regulations in East Africa were first applied by colonial governments. The Tropical Forestry Action Plan was conceived in 1987 by the World Resources Institute in cooperation with the Food and Agriculture Organization, the United Nations Development Program, and the World Bank with hopes of halting tropical forest destruction. In its bid to stress forest conservation and development, the World Bank provided $111,103 million to developing countries, especially in Africa, to help in developing long-range forest conservation and management programs meant for ending deforestation.

== Historical temperature and climate ==
In early 2007, scientists created an entirely new proxy to determine the annual mean air temperature on land—based on molecules from the cell membrane of soil-inhabiting bacteria. Scientists from the NIOZ, Royal Netherlands Institute for Sea Research conducted a temperature record dating back to 25,000 years ago.

In concordance with their German colleagues at the University of Bremen, this detailed record shows the history of land temperatures based on the molecular fossils of soil bacteria. When applying this to the outflow core of the Congo River, the core contained eroded land material and microfossils from marine algae. That concluded that the land environment of tropical Africa cooled more than the bordering Atlantic Ocean during the last ice age. Since the Congo River drains a large part of tropical central Africa, the land-derived material gives an integrated signal for a very large area. These findings further enlighten natural disparities in climate and the possible costs of a warming earth on precipitation in central Africa.

Scientists discovered a way to measure sea temperature—based on organic molecules from algae growing off the surface layer of the Ocean. These organisms acclimatize the molecular composition of their cell membranes to ambient temperature to sustain regular physiological properties. If such molecules sink to the sea floor and are buried in sediments where oxygen does not go through, they can be preserved for thousands of years. The ratios between the different molecules from the algal cell membrane can approximate the past temperature of the sea surface. The new “proxy” used in this sediment core obtained both a continental and a sea surface temperature record. In comparison, both records show that ocean surface and land temperatures behaved differently during the past 25,000 years. During the last ice age, African temperatures were 21 °C, about 4 °C lower than today, while the tropical Atlantic Ocean was only about 2.5 °C cooler. Lead author Johan Weijers and his colleagues concluded that the land-sea temperature difference has by far the largest influence on continental rainfall. The relation of air pressure to temperature strongly determines this factor. During the last ice age, the land climate in tropical Africa was drier than it is now, whereas it favors the growth of a lush rainforest.

== See also ==
- African Rainforest Conservancy (ARC)
- Global 200
- Plant Resources of Tropical Africa

== Bibliography ==
- Burgess, N., J.D. Hales, E. Underwood, and E. Dinerstein (2004). Terrestrial Ecoregions of Africa and Madagascar: A Conservation Assessment. Island Press, Washington, D.C.
- Thieme, M.L., R. Abell, M.L.J. Stiassny, P. Skelton, B. Lehner, G.G. Teugels, E. Dinerstein, A.K. Toham, N. Burgess & D. Olson. 2005. Freshwater ecoregions of Africa and Madagascar: A conservation assessment. Washington D.C.: World Wildlife Fund.

Ecoregion	Location(s)
Alai–Western Tian Shan steppe	Kazakhstan, Tajikistan, Uzbekistan
Altai steppe and semi-desert	Kazakhstan
Central Anatolian steppe	Turkey
Daurian forest steppe	China, Mongolia, Russia
Eastern Anatolian montane steppe	Armenia, Azerbaijan, Georgia, Iran, Turkey
Emin Valley steppe	China, Kazakhstan
Faroe Islands boreal grasslands	Faroe Islands, Denmark
Gissaro–Alai open woodlands	Kyrgyzstan, Tajikistan, Uzbekistan
Kazakh forest steppe	Kazakhstan, Russia
Kazakh steppe	Kazakhstan, Russia
Kazakh Uplands	Kazakhstan
Mongolian–Manchurian grassland	China, Mongolia, Russia
Pontic steppe	Kazakhstan, Moldova, Romania, Russia, Ukraine, Bulgaria
Sayan Intermontane steppe	Russia
Selenge–Orkhon forest steppe	Mongolia, Russia
South Siberian forest steppe	Russia
Syrian xeric grasslands and shrublands	Iraq, Jordan, Syria
Tian Shan foothill arid steppe	China, Kazakhstan, Kyrgyzstan
