= Orycteropus abundulafus =

Orycteropus abundulafus Temporal range: Miocene-Pliocene

Scientific classification
- Domain: Eukaryota
- Kingdom: Animalia
- Phylum: Chordata
- Class: Mammalia
- Order: Tubulidentata
- Family: Orycteropodidae
- Genus: Orycteropus
- Species: †O. abundulafus

Binomial name
- †Orycteropus abundulafus Lehmann, Vignaud, Likius & Brunet, 2005

Extinct species of mammal

Orycteropus abundulafus is an extinct species of aardvark. Its fossil was found in northern Chad. It lived in the Mio-Pliocene epochs.
