= Endostemon tenuiflorus =

Conservation status
- Least Concern (SANBI Red List)

Scientific classification
- Kingdom: Plantae
- Clade: Embryophytes
- Clade: Tracheophytes
- Clade: Angiosperms
- Clade: Eudicots
- Clade: Asterids
- Order: Lamiales
- Family: Lamiaceae
- Genus: Endostemon
- Species: E. tenuiflorus

Binomial name
- Endostemon tenuiflorus (Benth.) M.Ashby

Synonyms
- Orthosiphon tenuiflorus Benth.; Pseudocimum tenuiflorus (Benth.) Bremek.; Ocimum depauperatum Vatke; Orthosiphon depauperatum A.Terracc.; Pseudocimum trichocalyx Bremek.

Species of flowering plant

Endostemon tenuiflorus is a species of flowering plant in the family Lamiaceae and commonly called the slenderleaf keepsafe or, sometimes in South Africa, the mopaneveld keepsafe.

== Description ==
This species is a perennial, softly sticky dwarf shrublet 0.15–0.25 m (5.9 in – 9.8 in) tall, woody at the base and freely branched. The stems are ascending and covered with fine glandular bristles.

The leaves are subsessile and often leathery, with linear to linear-oblanceolate blades, 12–40 mm (0.47–1.57 in) long. The surfaces are roughened by numerous sunken glands, with blunt tips, narrowed bases, and margins that are obscurely and distantly toothed, often rolled under.

The inflorescences are lax racemes 50–70 mm (2.0–2.8 in) long, composed of several spaced whorls, each bearing two flowers. The bracts are 1.5–5 mm (0.059–0.197 in) long. The calyx is spiny and strongly veined, hairy within the throat, and enlarges to about 3.5 mm (0.14 in) at maturity; the tube is bell-shaped, with narrow, awl-shaped lateral teeth shorter than the lower pair. The corolla is whitish to mauve or pink, 8–9 mm (0.31–0.35 in) long, with a cylindrical tube and short lobes.

=== Identification ===
In northeastern Africa, Endostemon tenuiflorus looks closest to Endostemon glandulosus in Ethiopia. The latter has a shorter inflorescence, however, and its corolla is five-lobed.

== Distribution and habitat ==
Endostemon tenuiflorus′s geographic range spans southern Africa, northeastern tropical Africa, southern Madagascar, Socotra, and the Arabian Peninsula. In southern Africa, it has been recorded in northwestern Namibia, Botswana, southernmost Zimbabwe, and South Africa′s Limpopo and Mpumalanga provinces. It tends to be found in drier savannah, including Acacia–Commiphora bushland and Zambezian and mopane woodlands.

== See also ==
- List of Lamiaceae of South Africa
