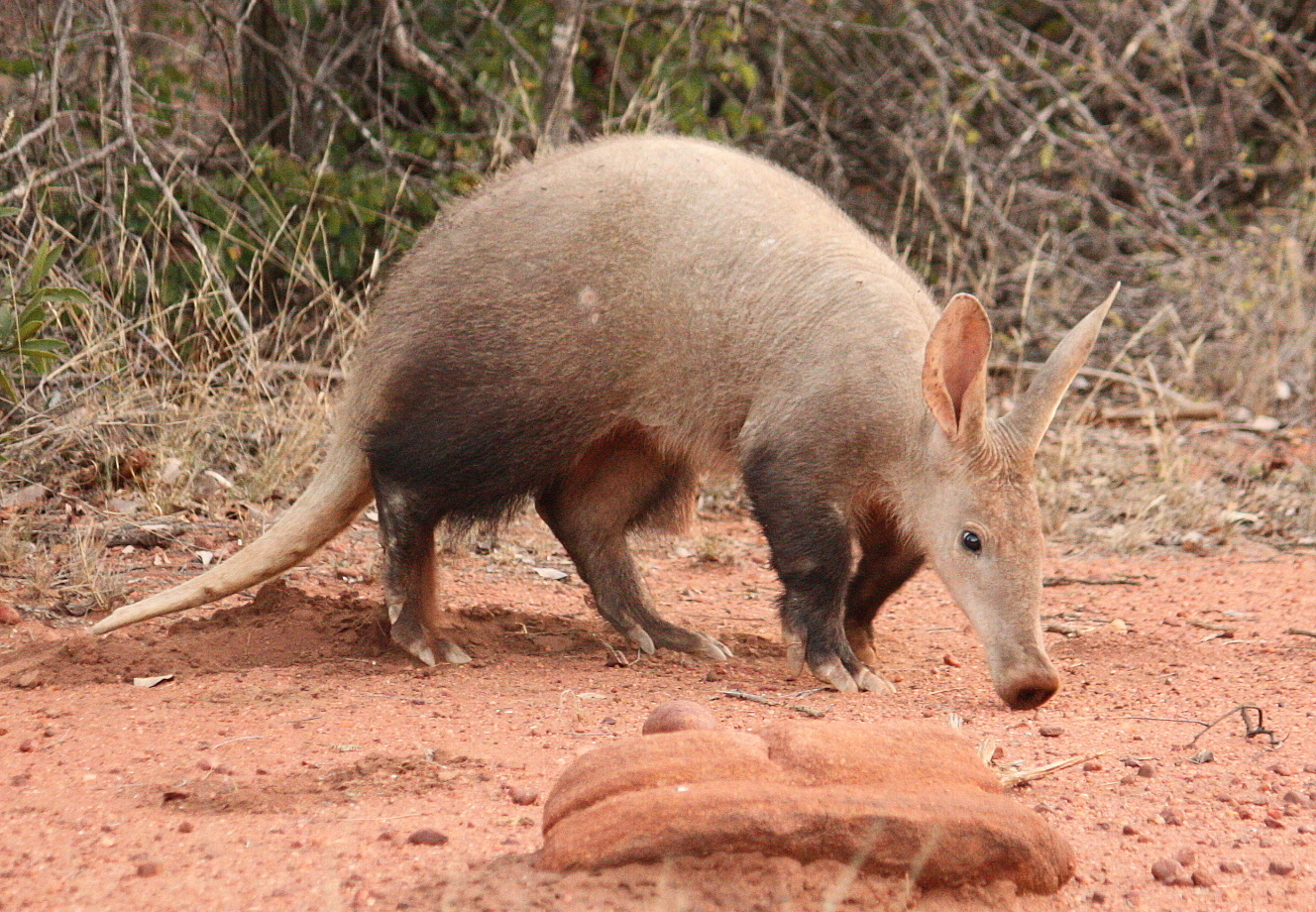
- Orycteropus afer – Aardvark

Scientific classification
- Kingdom: Animalia
- Phylum: Chordata
- Class: Mammalia
- Order: Tubulidentata
- Family: Orycteropodidae
- Genus: Orycteropus; É. Geoffroy Saint-Hilaire, 1796

Type species
- Myrmecophaga afra Pallas, 1766

Species
- 4, see text

= Orycteropus =

Orycteropus Temporal range: Late Miocene–Recent

Genus of mammals

Orycteropus is a genus of mammals in the family Orycteropodidae within Tubulidentata. The genus is known from Late Miocene to recent of Africa.

The only living species within Tubulidentata is the aardvark (Orycteropus afer).

== Species ==
Three species are recognized:

- Orycteropus afer (Pallas, 1766) – aardvark – Palaeolithic to Recent of Africa
- † Orycteropus abundulafus Lehmann, Vignaud, Likius & Brunet, 2005
- † Orycteropus crassidens MacInnes, 1955 – Pleistocene of Kenya
- † Orycteropus djourabensis Lehmann, Vignaud, Mackaye & Brunet, 2004 – Early Pliocene to Early Pleistocene of Chad and Kenya

Other species previously assigned to Orycteropus are now classified in the genus Amphiorycteropus.
