= Endostemon obtusifolius =

Conservation status
- Least Concern (SANBI Red List)

Scientific classification
- Kingdom: Plantae
- Clade: Embryophytes
- Clade: Tracheophytes
- Clade: Spermatophytes
- Clade: Angiosperms
- Clade: Eudicots
- Clade: Asterids
- Order: Lamiales
- Family: Lamiaceae
- Genus: Endostemon
- Species: E. obtusifolius

Binomial name
- Endostemon obtusifolius (E.Mey. ex Benth.) N.E.Br.

Synonyms
- Ocimum obtusifolium E.Mey. ex Benth.; Ocimum laxiflorum Baker; Ocimum rariflorum Hochst.; Plectranthus rariflorus Hochst.

Species of flowering plant

Endostemon obtusifolius, commonly called the minty keepsafe, is a species of flowering plant in the family Lamiaceae. It is native to southeastern Africa.

== Description ==
This species is a straggling to erect herb or soft shrub 0.5–1.5 m (1 ft 8 in – 4 ft 11 in) tall, much branched, with hispid stems.

The leaves are borne on stalks, with broadly ovate blades 15–40 mm (0.59–1.57 in) long. The upper surface is thinly hairy, while the underside is more coarsely hispid and distinctly reticulate-veined. The leaf tips are blunt to rounded, the bases obtuse to truncate, and the margins are shallowly crenate to serrate. The petioles are 5–15 mm (0.20–0.59 in) long.

The inflorescences are lax racemes 150–300 mm (5.9–11.8 in) long, composed of many well-spaced whorls. Each whorl bears two to eight, occasionally up to twelve, flowers. The bracts are ovate and tapering, 4–5 mm (0.16–0.20 in) long. The calyx is hispid and about 3.5 mm (0.14 in) long at flowering, enlarging to 6–7 mm (0.24–0.28 in) in fruit. The corolla is white and about 5 mm (0.20 in) long.

Endostemon obtusifolius flowers from November to May.

=== Identification ===
In tropic eastern Africa, this species can be distinguished from Endostemon villosus and Endostemon usambarensis by its shorter, white flowers.

== Distribution and habitat ==
Endostemon obtusifolius grows in forest margins and along wooded streams in Angola, Eswatini, Malawi, Mozambique, Tanzania, Zambia, Zimbabwe, and South Africa. In the latter country, it can be found from the Soutpansberg to Barberton, through coastal and semi-coastal Kwazulu-Natal into the Eastern Cape.

== See also ==
- List of Lamiaceae of South Africa
