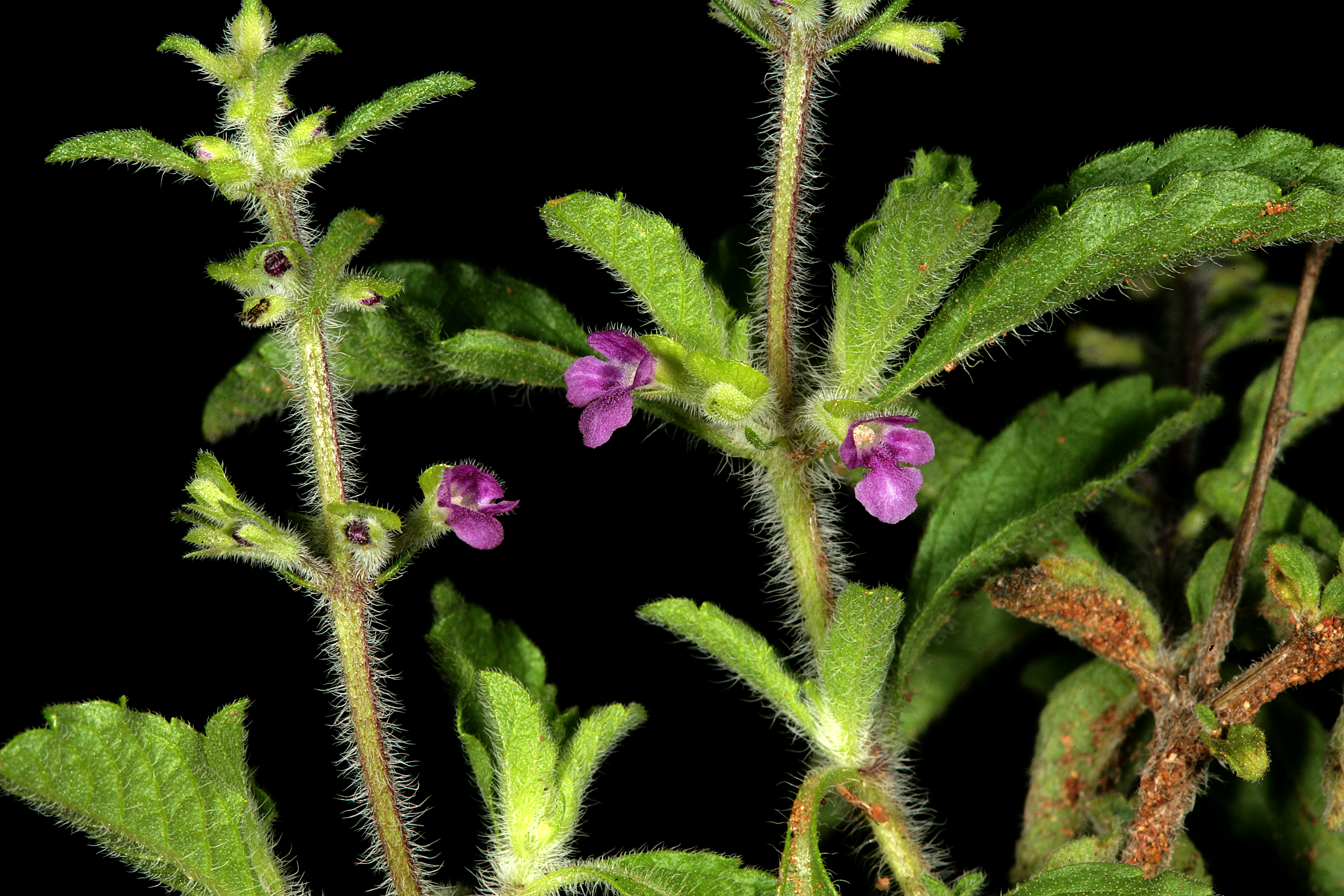

Conservation status
- Least Concern (SANBI Red List)

Scientific classification
- Kingdom: Plantae
- Clade: Embryophytes
- Clade: Tracheophytes
- Clade: Angiosperms
- Clade: Eudicots
- Clade: Asterids
- Order: Lamiales
- Family: Lamiaceae
- Genus: Endostemon
- Species: E. tereticaulis

Binomial name
- Endostemon tereticaulis (Poir.) M.Ashby

= Endostemon tereticaulis =

Species of flowering plant

Endostemon tereticaulis, commonly called the purpling keepsafe, is a species of flowering plant in the family Lamiaceae. It is found across much of sub-Saharan Africa, as well as the Arabian Peninsula.

== Description ==
This species is an aromatic annual or short-lived perennial woody herb 15–40 cm (5.9–15.7 in) tall, with a taproot. The stems are erect, much branched, woody at the base, and rounded to weakly four-angled, sometimes forming low cushions. They are pubescent with mostly forward-pointing hairs, occasionally spreading.

The leaves are borne on short stalks, with narrowly elliptic to obovate blades 0.5–3.5 cm (0.20–1.38 in) long. The surfaces are hairy and dotted with sessile glands. The margins are crenate, with rounded to blunt tips and wedge-shaped to shortly narrowed bases.

The inflorescence is lax, with whorls of usually six flowers spaced 5–15 mm (0.20–0.59 in) apart; the lowest internode is much shorter than those above. The bracts are leaf-like or smaller, erect near the apex and spreading below. The calyx is 2–4 mm (0.079–0.157 in) long at flowering and densely hairy with sessile glands, enlarging to 4–6 mm (0.16–0.24 in) in fruit. The corolla is purplish, 3–6 mm (0.12–0.24 in) long, with a short, straight tube and four lobes, the uppermost broader and often notched.

The fruit consists of smooth, brown nutlets about 2 mm (0.079 in) long, which produce mucilage when wetted.

== Distribution and habitat ==
Endostemon tereticaulis grows in dry, sandy or gravelly soils in grassy, open woodland at 30–1,300 m (98–4,265 ft) in altitude. Its geographic range extends from Senegal to Somalia, south to northern South Africa, and across the Red Sea to Saudi Arabia and Yemen.

== See also ==
- List of Lamiaceae of South Africa
