= Endostemon tomentosus =

Scientific classification
- Kingdom: Plantae
- Clade: Embryophytes
- Clade: Tracheophytes
- Clade: Angiosperms
- Clade: Eudicots
- Clade: Asterids
- Order: Lamiales
- Family: Lamiaceae
- Genus: Endostemon
- Species: E. tomentosus

Binomial name
- Endostemon tomentosus Harley & Sebsebe

Species of flowering plant

Endostemon tomentosus is a species of flowering plant in the family Lamiaceae. It is found in southern central Somalia in dry shrubland at 200–300 m (660–980 ft) in altitude.

== Description ==
A small shrublet up to 50 cm (20 in) tall, with four-angled stems. Older stems are pale brown with peeling bark, while younger growth is whitish and densely woolly.

Leaves are opposite, small, elliptic to oblong, grey-green (whitish when young), and covered on both surfaces with branched hairs; the margins are entire.

The inflorescence is a loose, raceme-like arrangement up to 7 cm (2.8 in) long, initially woolly but becoming less hairy with age. Flowers are purple and borne on short stalks. The calyx is strongly two-lipped and hairy at flowering, becoming longer and five-toothed in fruit, with the lateral teeth obliquely truncate and as long as or slightly longer than the ventral teeth. The corolla is four-lobed, with a shorter dorsal lip and smaller lateral lobes.

The ovary is four-chambered, surrounded by a five-lobed disc. The fruit consists of smooth, pale brown, oblong nutlets with fine reticulate veins.

=== Identification ===
Endostemon tomentosus can be recognised by the dense, felted indumentum of branched hairs on its young stems and leaves. It also differs from related species in the shape of the calyx, with the lateral teeth cut off obliquely and matching or slightly exceeding the ventral teeth in length, a combination of characters unique within the genus.
