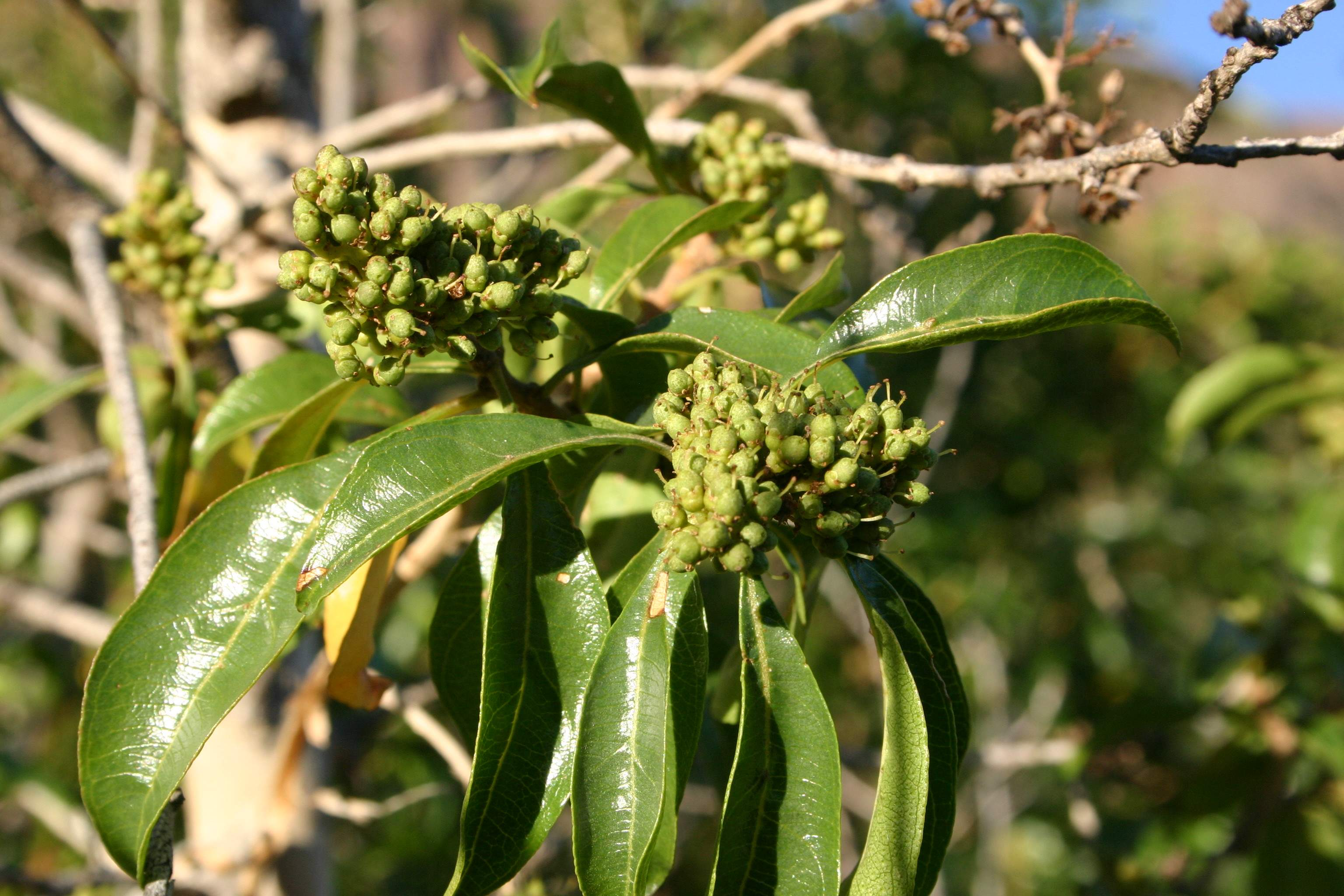

Scientific classification
- Kingdom: Plantae
- Clade: Tracheophytes
- Clade: Angiosperms
- Clade: Eudicots
- Clade: Rosids
- Order: Myrtales
- Family: Myrtaceae
- Subfamily: Psiloxyloideae
- Tribe: Heteropyxideae
- Genus: Heteropyxis; Harv.

Species
- Heteropyxis canescens Heteropyxis dehniae Heteropyxis natalensis

= Heteropyxis =

Genus of trees

Heteropyxis is a genus which includes three species of small evergreen trees. It was previously placed alone in the family Heteropyxidaceae, but is now placed basally within Myrtaceae. The species of Heteropyxis are native to southern Africa.

Heteropyxis natalensis, commonly known as lavender tree or laventelboom, ranges from Zimbabwe through Limpopo, Mpumalanga and KwaZulu-Natal of South Africa. It is a slender, upright tree which grows 5–7 metres in height, at forest margins, rocky outcrops, hillsides, and termite mounds. It bears panicles of fragrant flowers, cream to pale yellow in colour, from December to March.

Many classification schemes place Heteropyxis within the family Myrtaceae. Recent embryological and DNA analyses seem to indicate that Heteropyxis and Psiloxylon, the sole members of the family Psiloxylaceae, are sister taxa to the Myrtaceae, but diverged before the origin of the common ancestor of the Myrtaceae.
