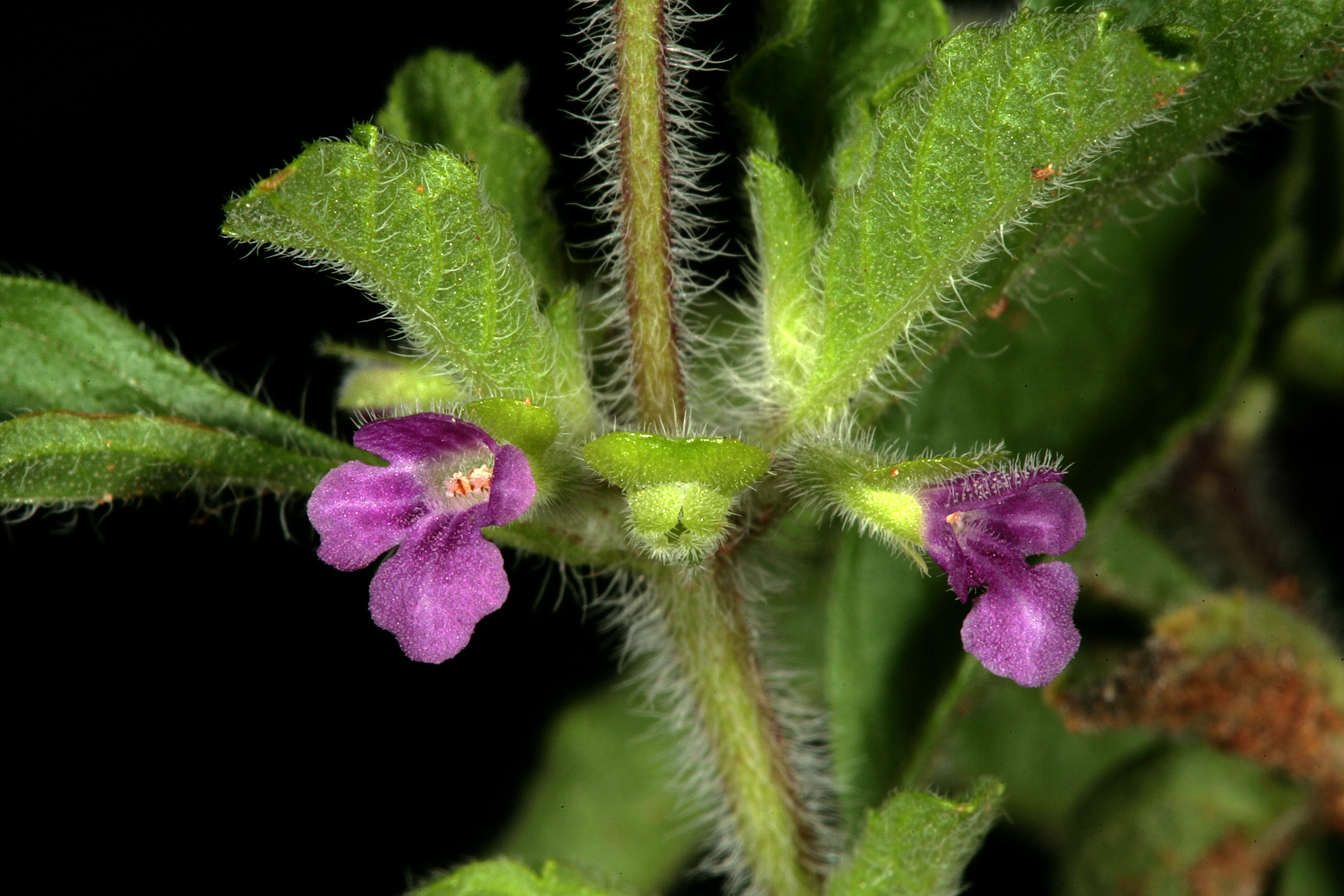
- Endostemon tereticaulis

Scientific classification
- Kingdom: Plantae
- Clade: Tracheophytes
- Clade: Angiosperms
- Clade: Eudicots
- Clade: Asterids
- Order: Lamiales
- Family: Lamiaceae
- Subfamily: Nepetoideae
- Tribe: Ocimeae
- Genus: Endostemon; N.E.Br.

Synonyms
- Pseudocimum Bremek.; Puntia Hedge

= Endostemon =

Genus of flowering plants

Endostemon is a genus of plants in the family Lamiaceae, commonly called keepsafes. There are 21 species, the majority of which are found in eastern Africa. Some species are present in central and southern Africa and the Arabian Peninsula. Madagascar and the Indian subcontinent each have one.

== Description ==
Members of this genus are aromatic annual or perennial herbs, woody herbs, or low subshrubs. The stems may be prostrate or erect, branching above and becoming woody at the base. The leaves are opposite.

The flowers are bisexual and borne in lax inflorescences of whorls with two to six flowers. The bracts are small and may form a weak terminal tuft. The calyx is persistent, shortly tubular to tubular-campanulate and two-lipped, with an ovate posterior lip and a four-lobed anterior lip. In fruit, the calyx enlarges, with the throat either open and glabrous, closed by converging lobes, or occluded by a dense ring of hairs.

The corolla is white, pink, purple, or bluish, slightly two-lipped and four-lobed, with a straight tube that widens at the throat. Four stamens are held within the corolla, with short hairy filaments and dorsifixed anthers. The ovary is deeply four-lobed, with a gynobasic style and capitate stigma.

The fruit consists of smooth black or brown nutlets, ovoid to narrowly ovoid, which produce variable amounts of mucilage when wetted.

== Taxonomy ==
The genus is divided into four sections.

=== Section Endostemon ===
Calyx shortly tubular; throat glabrous and open in fruit. Anterior lip with lanceolate teeth, the lateral lobes not extending towards the posterior lip. Pedicels terete. Ovary glabrous or hairy at the apex. Nutlets narrowly ovoid, triangular in cross section, truncate, glabrous or hairy at the apex.

- Endostemon obtusifolius (E.Mey.) N.E.Br.
- Endostemon membranaceus (Benth.) Ayob. ex A.J.Paton & Harley
- Endostemon palustris A.J.Paton & Goyder
- Endostemon tubulascens (Briq.) M.Ashby
- Endostemon usambarensis M.Ashby
- Endostemon villosus (Briq.) M.Ashby

=== Section Diffusi ===
Calyx tubular to tubular-campanulate; throat of fruiting calyx open but closed by a dense ring of long hairs. Anterior lip with deltate to lanceolate lateral lobes extending towards the posterior lip; median lobes linear and longer. Pedicels slightly flattened. Ovary glabrous. Nutlets ovoid with rounded apex.

- Endostemon albus A.J.Paton, Harley & M.M.Harley
- Endostemon ctenoneurus Harley
- Endostemon glandulosus Harley & Sebsebe
- Endostemon gracilis (Benth.) M.Ashby
- Endostemon obbiadensis (Chiov.) M.Ashby
- Endostemon racemosus Ryding, A.J.Paton & Thulin
- Endostemon stenocaulis (Hedge) Ryding, A.J.Paton & Thulin
- Endostemon tenuiflorus (Benth.) M.Ashby
- Endostemon viscosus (Roth) M.Ashby
- Endostemon wakefieldii (Baker) M.Ashby

=== Section Leucosphaeri ===
Calyx appearing spherical; fruiting calyx membranous with an open, glabrous throat. Posterior lip enlarged with coiled lateral lobes; anterior lip with lanceolate, slightly asymmetric lobes. Pedicels terete. Corolla lobes flat and spreading in a single plane. Ovary glabrous. Nutlets narrowly oblong-cylindrical, rounded to slightly angled in cross section, flattened at the base, with a rounded apex. Restricted to eastern Ethiopia and Somalia.

- Endostemon leucosphaerus (Briq.) A.J.Paton, Harley & M.M.Harley

=== Section Oblongi ===
Calyx tubular; fruiting calyx throat glabrous and closed by convergent lobes of the anterior lip pressed against the posterior lip. Pedicels flattened. Ovary glabrous. Nutlets narrowly ovate, rounded in cross section, with a rounded apex.

- Endostemon camporum (Gürke) M.Ashby
- Endostemon kelleri (Briq.) Ryding ex A.J.Paton & Harley
- Endostemon tereticaulis (Poir.) M.R.Ashby
- Endostemon tomentosus Harley & Sebsebe
