= Endostemon palustris =

Scientific classification
- Kingdom: Plantae
- Clade: Embryophytes
- Clade: Tracheophytes
- Clade: Spermatophytes
- Clade: Angiosperms
- Clade: Eudicots
- Clade: Asterids
- Order: Lamiales
- Family: Lamiaceae
- Genus: Endostemon
- Species: E. palustris

Binomial name
- Endostemon palustris A.J.Paton & Goyder

Species of flowering plant

Endostemon palustris is a species of flowering plant in the family Lamiaceae. Commonly called the Cuito River keepsafe, it is endemic to Angola.

== Description ==
This is an aromatic perennial suffrutex with a few erect stems arising from a thick woody rootstock. Stems are 15–30 cm (5.9–11.8 in) tall, branched near the base, square above and rounded below, with both glandular and non-glandular hairs.

Leaves are verticillate, sessile, linear, and folded along the midrib, 2.5–5 cm (0.98–1.97 in) long and pubescent. The inflorescences are lax, with 4–6-flowered verticils spaced 1.5–2.5 cm (0.59–0.98 in) apart; bracts are lanceolate to narrowly ovate.

The calyx is about 5 mm (0.20 in) long at flowering, pubescent and glandular, enlarging to 8–9 mm (0.31–0.35 in) in fruit. The corolla is pale violet, 8–10 mm (0.31–0.39 in) long, with a straight tube widening at the throat. Ovaries are pubescent at the apex.

=== Identification ===
This species is related to another Angolan endemic, Endostemon tubulascens, but can be distinguished from it by, among other things, its leaves, which are sessile and linear as opposed to petiolate and elliptic.

== Distribution and habitat ==
Endostemon palustris has only been recorded in central Angola, in marshland close to the source of the Cuito River.
