= Eteketoni =

Eteketoni Temporal range: Early Miocene

Scientific classification
- Kingdom: Animalia
- Phylum: Chordata
- Class: Mammalia
- Order: Tubulidentata
- Family: Orycteropodidae
- Genus: †Eteketoni
- Species: †E. platycephalus

Binomial name
- †Eteketoni platycephalus Pickford, 2019

Extinct genus of mammals

Eteketoni is an extinct genus of orycteropodid that lived in Uganda during the Early Miocene. Described by Martin Pickford, it is a monotypic genus that contains the species Eteketoni platycephalus.
