= Endostemon glandulosus =

Scientific classification
- Kingdom: Plantae
- Clade: Embryophytes
- Clade: Tracheophytes
- Clade: Angiosperms
- Clade: Eudicots
- Clade: Asterids
- Order: Lamiales
- Family: Lamiaceae
- Genus: Endostemon
- Species: E. glandulosus

Binomial name
- Endostemon glandulosus Harley & Sebsebe

Species of flowering plant

Endostemon glandulosus is a species of flowering plant in the family Lamiaceae. It is found in southern Ethiopia.

== Description ==
This species is a low, spreading perennial herb 6–15 cm (2.4–5.9 in) tall, sometimes rooting at the nodes. The stems and branches are purple to brown, four-angled, and largely hairless, with a few bristly hairs at the nodes.

The leaves are opposite and narrowly linear, 7–22 mm (0.28–0.87 in) long, channelled above with rolled, entire margins. They are pale green on both surfaces and mostly hairless, with occasional long hairs along the margins and numerous sunken sessile glands.

The inflorescence is lax and raceme-like, purplish, up to 4–5 cm (1.6–2.0 in) long, bearing one to four small, two-flowered whorls. The flowers are carried on slender stalks and have a purplish calyx with scattered glandular hairs. The corolla is white to pale pink, 13–17 mm (0.51–0.67 in) long, with rounded lobes; the upper lobe is sometimes notched or divided.

In fruit, the calyx enlarges slightly and becomes nearly hairless. The fruit consists of smooth, pale brown, ovoid nutlets about 1.5 mm (0.059 in) long.

=== Identification ===
This species can be separated from other members of the genus by its spreading habit and occasional rooting nodes, smooth stems and leaves, and distinctly grooved leaf blades. Its corolla can be highly distinctive, too: the upper lip is sometimes divided, rendering the flower five-lobed. All other Endostemon species have flowers with four lobes.
