= Endostemon villosus =

Scientific classification
- Kingdom: Plantae
- Clade: Embryophytes
- Clade: Tracheophytes
- Clade: Spermatophytes
- Clade: Angiosperms
- Clade: Eudicots
- Clade: Asterids
- Order: Lamiales
- Family: Lamiaceae
- Genus: Endostemon
- Species: E. villosus

Binomial name
- Endostemon villosus (Briq.) M.Ashby

Synonyms
- Orthosiphon villosus Briq.; Endostemon dissitifolius (Baker) M.Ashby; Endostemon malosanus (Baker) M.Ashby; Endostemon tuberifer R.D.Good; Orthosiphon dissitifolius Baker; Orthosiphon hockii De Wild.; Orthosiphon homblei De Wild.; Orthosiphon malosanus Baker; Orthosiphon obscurus Briq.; Orthosiphon tomentosus De Wild.; Orthosiphon unyikensis Gürke

Species of flowering plant

Endostemon villosus is a species of flowering plant in the family Lamiaceae commonly called the downy keepsafe. It is found in southern tropical Africa.

== Description ==
This species is an aromatic perennial herb 20–60 cm (7.9–23.6 in) tall, with several stems arising from a thick woody rootstock bearing tuberous roots. The stems are erect, rounded to four-angled, woody at the base, and branch towards the upper parts. The epidermis may peel in strips near the base. The stems are sparsely to densely hairy, with a mixture of glandular and non-glandular hairs.

The leaves are borne on short stalks and are often ascending. The blades are ovate, 0.5–5 cm (0.20–1.97 in) long, with serrate to crenate margins, sometimes with small pointed teeth. The tips are acute to rounded, and the bases broadly wedge-shaped to narrowed. Both surfaces are hairy and dotted with sessile glands.

The inflorescences are terminal or lateral, with whorls of four to six flowers spaced 10–25 mm (0.39–0.98 in) apart. The bracts are often purplish, elliptic to narrowly ovate, and may form a small terminal tuft. The pedicels are spreading and about 4–5 mm (0.16–0.20 in) long. The calyx is often purplish and 4–5 mm (0.16–0.20 in) long at flowering, enlarging in fruit to 8–11 mm (0.31–0.43 in), with a glabrous throat. The corolla is pink to mauve, 7–11 mm (0.28–0.43 in) long, with a straight tube and four lobes, the uppermost slightly notched.

The ovary is hairy at the apex. The fruit consists of narrowly ovoid nutlets about 2 mm (0.079 in) long, which produce a small amount of mucilage when wetted.

== Distribution and habitat ==
Endostemon villosus can be found growing in Miombo woodlands in Angola, Burundi, the southern DRC, Malawi, northern Mozambique, southwestern Tanzania, and Zambia.
