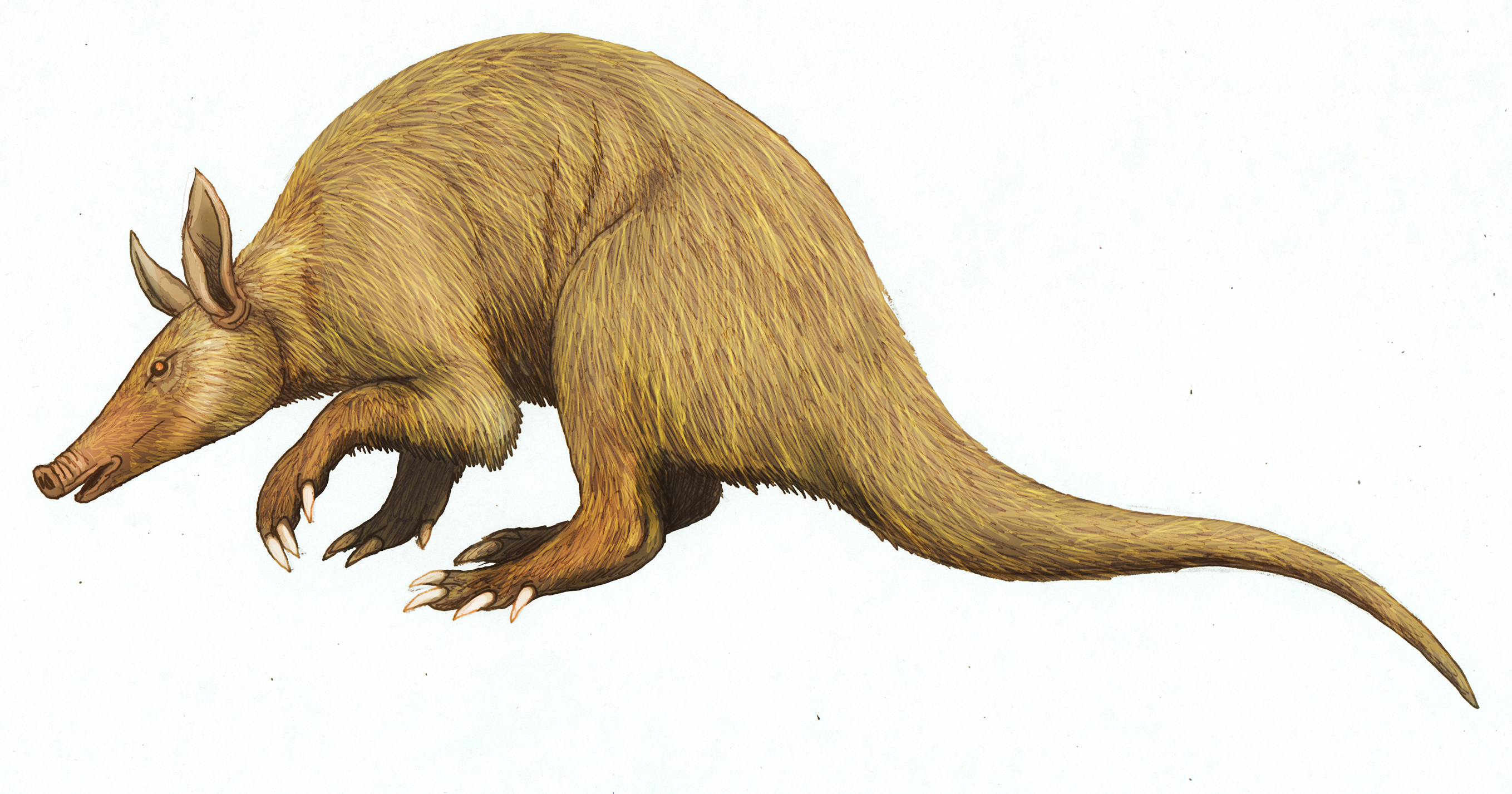

Scientific classification
- Kingdom: Animalia
- Phylum: Chordata
- Class: Mammalia
- Infraclass: Placentalia
- Order: Tubulidentata
- Family: Orycteropodidae
- Genus: †Amphiorycteropus; Lehmann, 2009

Type species
- Amphiorycteropus gaudryi Major, 1888

Species
- 5 + 2, see text

= Amphiorycteropus =

Amphiorycteropus Temporal range: Middle Miocene–Early Pliocene

Extinct family of mammals

Amphiorycteropus (Latin for "near aardvark") is an extinct genus of mammals in the family Orycteropodidae within Tubulidentata. The genus is known from fossils dating from Middle Miocene to Early Pliocene, found in Africa, Asia and Europe.

== Species ==
Five species are recognized:

- Amphiorycteropus abundulafus (Lehmann, Vignaud, Likius & Brunet, 2005) - Late Miocene of Chad
- Amphiorycteropus mauritanicus (Arambourg, 1959) - Late Miocene of Algeria
- Amphiorycteropus browni (Colbert, 1933) - Middle to Late Miocene of Pakistan
- Amphiorycteropus depereti (Helbing, 1933) - Early Pliocene of France
- Amphiorycteropus gaudryi (Major, 1888) - Late Miocene of Greece and Turkey

Two other species are assigned to the genus provisionally until new material are found and confirm the relationship:

- Amphiorycteropus pottieri (Ozansoy, 1965) - Late Miocene of Turkey
- Amphiorycteropus seni (Tekkaya, 1993) - Middle Miocene of Turkey
