= Acacia–Commiphora bushland =

Bushland dominated by Commiphora and Acacia

Acacia–Commiphora bushland is the predominant plant community of northeastern tropical Africa. It occurs in Ethiopia, Kenya, Somalia, South Sudan, and Tanzania.

It is made up of dense shrubs 3 to 5 meters tall, with scattered emergent trees growing up to 9 meters tall. The predominant species are acacias (genera Acacia, Senegalia, and Vachellia) and species of Commiphora. Many acacias and some Commiphoras are spiny, and can form impenetrable thickets. Most trees and shrubs are deciduous, shedding their leaves in the dry season, with evergreen trees and shrubs making up 2.5 to 10% of the total mass of plants.

== Ecoregions ==
Three Acacia–Commiphora ecoregions are recognized.

- Northern Acacia-Commiphora bushlands and thickets – northwestern, central, and southwestern Kenya, southwestern Somalia, and southeastern South Sudan
- Somali Acacia-Commiphora bushlands and thickets – southeastern Ethiopia, northeastern Kenya, and central Somalia
- Southern Acacia-Commiphora bushlands and thickets – southwestern Kenya and northern and central Tanzania
