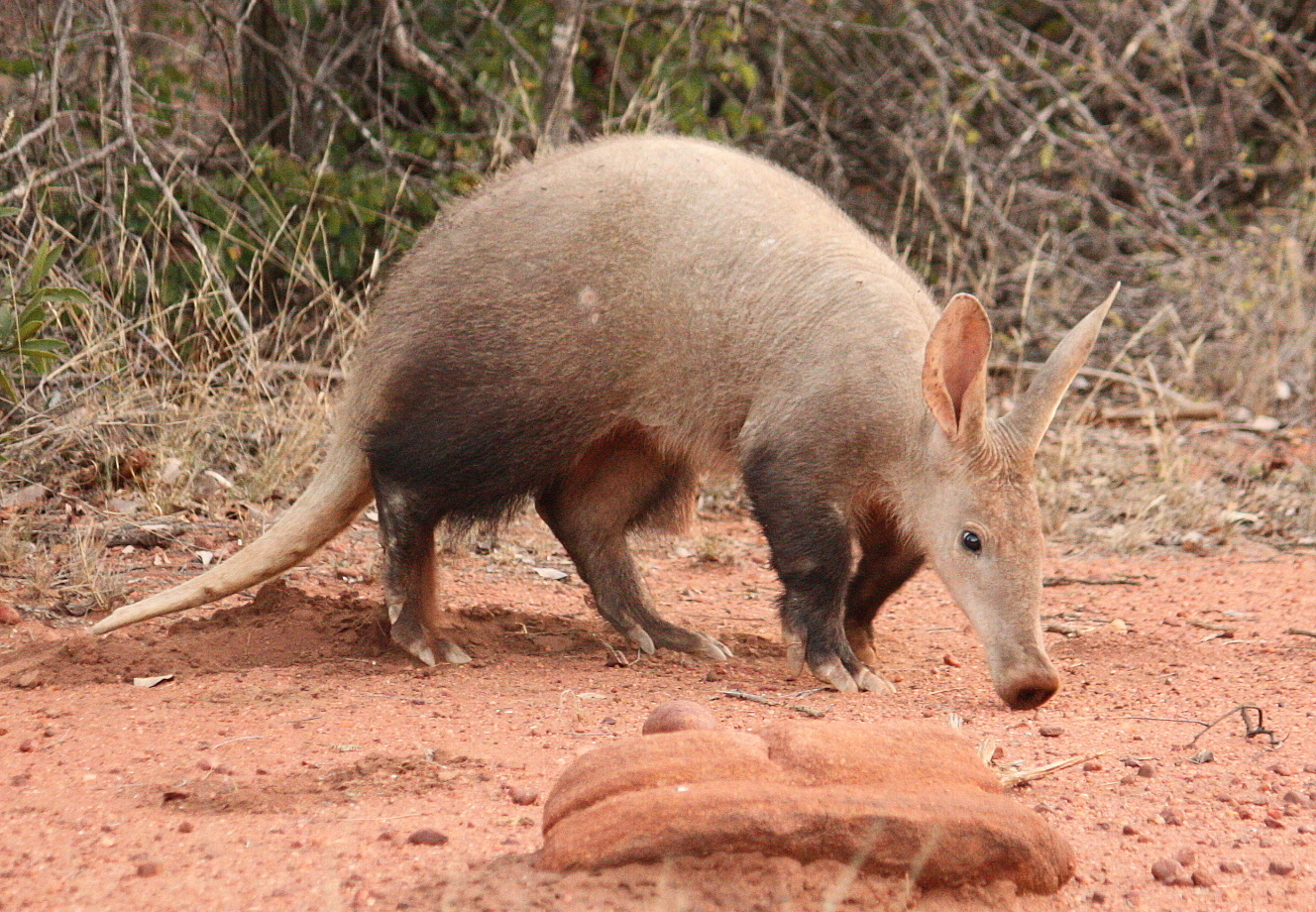
- Aardvark (Orycteropus afer)

Scientific classification
- Kingdom: Animalia
- Phylum: Chordata
- Class: Mammalia
- Superorder: Afrotheria
- Grandorder: Afroinsectiphilia
- Order: Tubulidentata; Huxley, 1872
- Family: Orycteropodidae; Gray, 1821

Genera
- Orycteropus †Amphiorycteropus †Eteketoni †Leptorycteropus †Myorycteropus

= Orycteropodidae =

Orycteropodidae Temporal range: 20–0 Ma Early Miocene to Recent

Mammal family containing the aardvark

Orycteropodidae is a family of afrotherian mammals. Although there are many fossil species, the only species surviving today is the aardvark (Orycteropus afer). Orycteropodidae is recognized as the only family within the order Tubulidentata (from Latin tubulus 'little tube' and dens 'tooth'), referring to the tubule-style teeth, so the two are effectively synonyms.

== Evolution ==
The first aardvark fossil discovered was originally named Orycteropus gaudryi (now Amphiorycteropus) and was found in Turolian deposits on the island of Samos. Since then, representatives of the order Tubulidentata have been located from the Oligocene in what is now Europe, and it is believed that the order probably originated around 65–70 million years ago or in the Paleocene. They are thought to be closely related to Ptolemaiida, an extinct lineage of carnivorous afrotheres. The family arose in Africa in the Early Miocene epoch, and spread to Eurasia later in the Miocene. Most of the family's diversity had become extinct by the end of the Pliocene.

== Characteristics ==
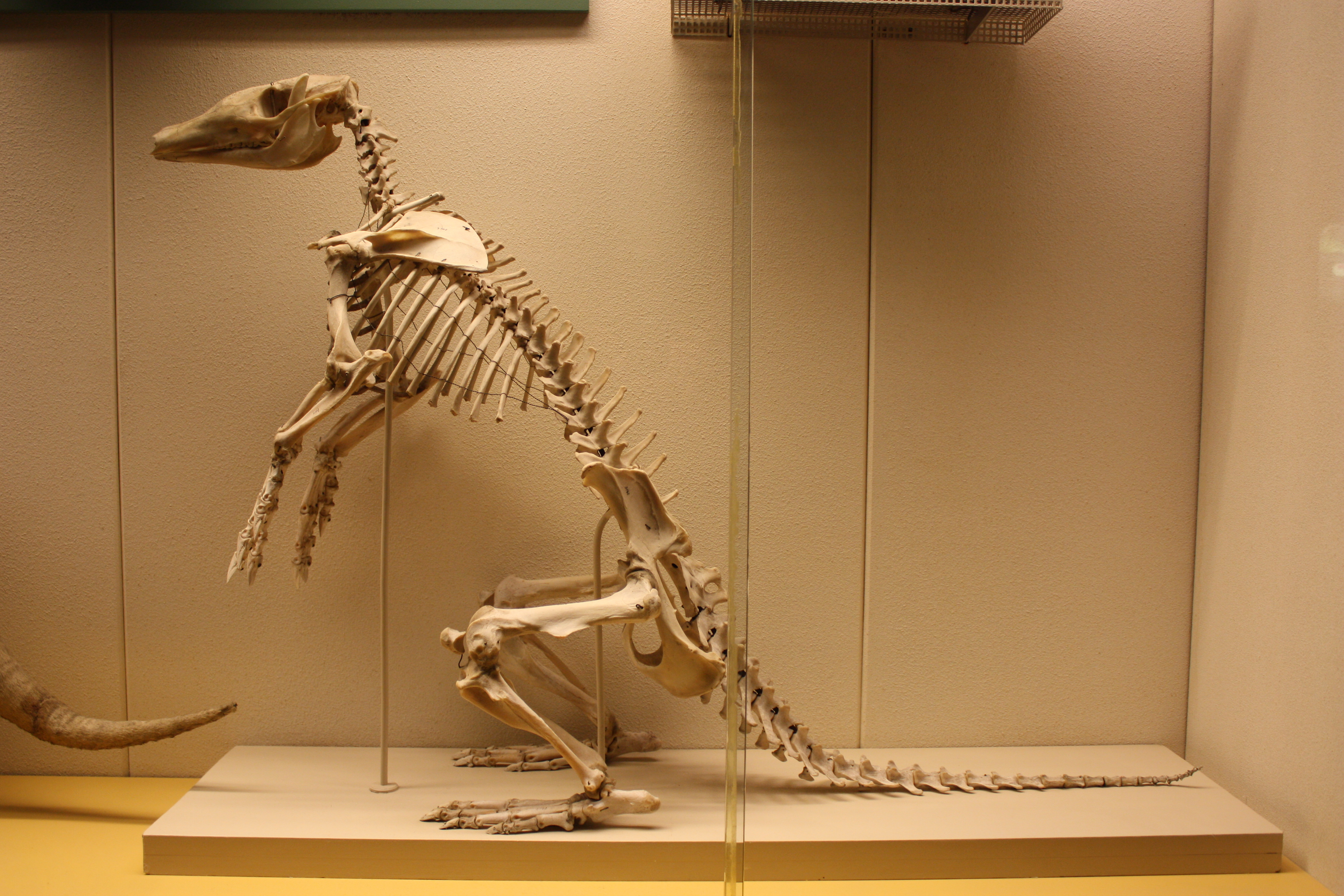
Orycteropodidae skeleton

Aardvarks were originally categorized as relatives of American anteaters in the order Edentata. However, their unique teeth structure and other morphological characteristics made it clear that aardvarks are not closely related to any other living mammals. Since the end of the 19th century, the aardvark has been placed in a separate order, Tubulidentata. Both the fossil record and genetic studies have corroborated that separate status. All similarities to American anteaters have evolved independently as adaptations to eating ants and termites.

One of the most distinctive features of the animals is that their teeth have a "tubulidentate" microstructure, lacking enamel, and are rounded structures of dentine. They lack incisors and canines, and have 20–22 teeth, which are unrooted, diphyodont, and continuously grow. Another unique trait is that their small milk teeth are lost before the animal is born.

A few anatomical characters unite the Orycteropodidae and Tubulidentata. The occipital region of the skull has extensive mastoid exposure, the femur has a pectineal tubercle, and the diaphysis of the tibia is curved mediolaterally.

Modern aardvarks are polygynous, the females providing care for the young. They are territorial, and only cross paths to breed. The males' genitals create a musk while females create this musk from glands in their elbows, this scent helps mating occur. The gestation period lasts about seven months, and they are dependent upon the mother until they are six months of age, becoming sexually mature at two years of age. Breeding occurs once a year, they produce one offspring, and will have maybe one to two more in their lifetime. Aardvarks are myrmecophagous, feeding almost exclusively on termites and ants. They rely on their sense of smell to find most of their food and hunt at night.

== Classification ==
This classification follows Lehmann 2009.

- Genus †Scotaeops Ameghino 1887 [Scoteops [sic] Ameghino 1894]
  - †S. simplex Ameghino 1887
- Genus †Archaeorycteropus Ameghino 1905
- Genus †Palaeorycteropus Filhol 1893 [Palaeoryctoropus [sic] Filhol 1893]
  - †P. quercyi Filhol 1893
- Genus † Myorycteropus MacInnes, 1956
  - †M. africanus MacInnes, 1956 [Orycteropus africanus MacInnes 1955] type species
  - †aff. M. chemeldoi (Pickford, 1975) [Orycteropus chemeldoi Pickford 1975]
  - †aff. M. minutus (Pickford, 1975) [Orycteropus minutus Pickford 1975]
- Genus †Leptorycteropus Patterson, 1975
  - †L. guilielmi Patterson, 1975
- Genus †Amphiorycteropus Lehmann 2009
  - †A. gaudryi (Major, 1888) [Orycteropus gaudryi Major 1888] type species
  - †A. abundulafus (Lehmann et al., 2005) [Orycteropus abundulafus Lehmann et al. 2005]
  - †A. browni (Colbert, 1933) [Orycteropus browni Colbert 1933; Orycteropus pilgrimi Colbert 1933]
  - †A. depereti (Helbing, 1933) [Orycteropus depereti Helbing 1933]
  - †A. mauritanicus (Arambourg, 1959) [Orycteropus mauritanicus Arambourg 1959]
  - †aff. A. pottieri (Ozansoy, 1965) [Orycteropus pottieri Ozansoy 1965]
  - †aff. A. seni (Tekkaya, 1993) [Orycteropus seni Tekkaya 1993]
- Genus Orycteropus Geoffroy St. Hilaire 1796 [Oryctopus [sic] Rafinesque 1815; Oryctheropus [sic] Muirhead 1819; Orajeteropus [sic] Hill 1913]
  - †O. crassidens MacInnes, 1956
  - †O. djourabensis Lehmann et al. 2004
  - O. afer (Pallas 1776) Aardvark (type species)
    - O. a. capensis (Gmelin 1788) [Myrmecophaga capensis Gmelin 1788; Orycteropus capensis Gmelin 1788] (Cape Aardvark)
    - O. a. senegalensis Lesson 1840 [Orycteropus senegalensis Schinz 1845] (Western/Senegambian Aardvark)
    - O. a. haussanus Matschie 1900 [Orycteropus haussanus Matschie 1900] (Hausa Aardvark)
    - O. a. adametzi Grote 1921 [Orycteropus adametzi]
    - O. a. leptodon Hirst 1906 [Orycteropus leptodon Hirst 1906] (Cameroon Aardvark)
    - O. a. erikssoni Lönnberg 1906 [Orycteropus erikssoni Lonnberg 1906; Orycteropus erikssoni erikssoni] (Eriksson's/North Congo Aardvark)
    - O. a. albicaudus Rothschild 1907 (South-western/Damara Aardvark)
    - O. a. angolensis Zukowsky & Haltenorth 1957 [Orycteropus angolensis] (Angolan Aardvark)
    - O. a. afer (Pallas 1776) [Orycteropus afer wertheri Matschie 1898; Orycteropus wertheri Matschie 1900 (East African/Bagamoyo Aardvark)] (Southern Aardvark)
    - O. a. wardi Lydekker 1908 [Orycteropus wardi] (Congo/Ward's Aardvark)
    - O. a. observandus Grote 1921 [Orycteropus observandus]
    - O. a. matschiei Grote 1921 [Orycteropus matschiei]
    - O. a. lademanni Grote 1911 [Orycteropus lademanni]
    - O. a. ruvanensis Grote 1921 [Orycteropus ruvanensis] (Ruwana Aardvark)
    - O. a. faradjius Hatt 1932 [Orycteropus erikssoni faradjius] (Faradje Aardvark)
    - O. a. kordofanicus Rothschild 1927 [Orycteropus kordofanicus] (Kordofan Aardvark)
    - O. a. aethiopicus Sundevall 1843 [Orycteropus aethiopicus] (Northeastern/Abyssinian Aardvark)
    - O. a. somalicus Lydekker 1908 [Orycteropus somalicus] (Somalia Aardvark)
