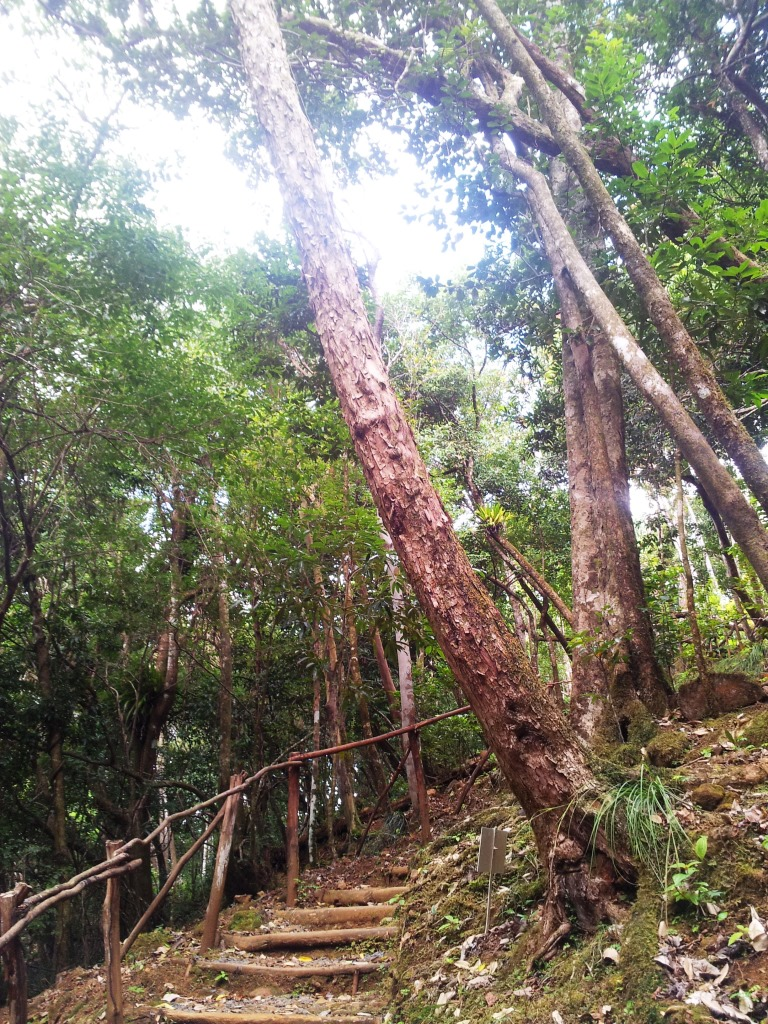
- Psiloxylon mauritianum tree growing in Vallée de Ferney reserve, Mauritius.

Scientific classification
- Kingdom: Plantae
- Clade: Tracheophytes
- Clade: Angiosperms
- Clade: Eudicots
- Clade: Rosids
- Order: Myrtales
- Family: Myrtaceae
- Subfamily: Psiloxyloideae
- Tribe: Psiloxyleae; A.J.Scott
- Genus: Psiloxylon; Thouars ex Tul.
- Species: P. mauritianum

Binomial name
- Psiloxylon mauritianum (Bouton ex Hook.f.) Baill.

Synonyms
- Fropiera mauritiana Bouton ex Hook. f.

= Psiloxylon =

Genus of flowering plants

Psiloxylon mauritianum (known locally as "bois bigaignon") is a species of flowering plant, the sole species of the genus Psiloxylon. It is endemic to the Mascarene Islands (Mauritius and Réunion) in the Indian Ocean.

It is a white-barked evergreen tree, bearing essential oils. It is dioecious, with male and female flowers on separate individuals. It is traditionally used as a medicinal plant, and appears contain compounds that inhibit the growth of Staphylococcus aureus.

It was formerly placed alone in family Psiloxylaceae, but is now considered a basal member of the family Myrtaceae.
