= Zieria lasiocaulis =

Willi Willi zieria

Conservation status
- Endangered (EPBC Act)

Scientific classification
- Kingdom: Plantae
- Clade: Tracheophytes
- Clade: Angiosperms
- Clade: Eudicots
- Clade: Rosids
- Order: Sapindales
- Family: Rutaceae
- Genus: Zieria
- Species: Z. lasiocaulis

Binomial name
- Zieria lasiocaulis J.A.Armstr.

Species of flowering plant

Zieria lasiocaulis, commonly known as Willi Willi zieria, is a rare species of flowering plant in the citrus family Rutaceae and is endemic to New South Wales. It is a tall shrub or small tree with three-part leaves and inconspicuous white flowers, found only at high altitudes in areas with a high rainfall.

== Description ==
Zieria lasiocaulis is a tall shrub or small tree which grows to a height of 6 m (20 ft) and has branches which are dotted with oil glands and which are strongly scented when bruised. Younger branches are covered with fine hairs. The leaves are composed of three leaflets with the central one elliptic to lance-shaped with the narrower end towards the base, 40–60 mm (2–2 in) long and 15–22 mm (0.6–0.9 in) wide with a petiole 17–21 mm (0.7–0.8 in) long. The leaves are more or less glabrous but strongly scented when crushed. The flowers are usually arranged in large groups, the groups shorter than the leaves. The sepals are triangular, about 1 mm (0.04 in) long and the four petals are white, about 4 mm (0.2 in) long, overlap at their bases and are covered with soft hairs. Flowering occurs from late autumn to spring and the fruits which follow in summer are glabrous and dotted with oil glands.

== Taxonomy and naming ==
Zieria lasiocaulis was first formally described in 2002 by Jim Armstrong and the description was published in Australian Systematic Botany from a specimen collected on Mount Banda Banda. According to Armstrong, the specific epithet (lasiocaulis) is derived from Greek lasio meaning "hairy" and caulis, meaning "stem", referring to the long, simple hairs on the younger branches. The ancient Greek word for "hairy" is lasios (λάσιος) and the word for "stem" is kaulos (καυλός). Caulis is the Latin word for "stem".

== Distribution and habitat ==
Willi Willi zieria grows on rocky cliffs and on rainforest margins in the Willi Willi National Park, Werrikimbe National Park and New England National Park.

== Conservation ==
This zieria is classified as "endangered" under the New South Wales Threatened Species Conservation Act and the Commonwealth Government Environment Protection and Biodiversity Conservation Act 1999 (EPBC) Act. The main threat to the species is inappropriate fire regimes.
