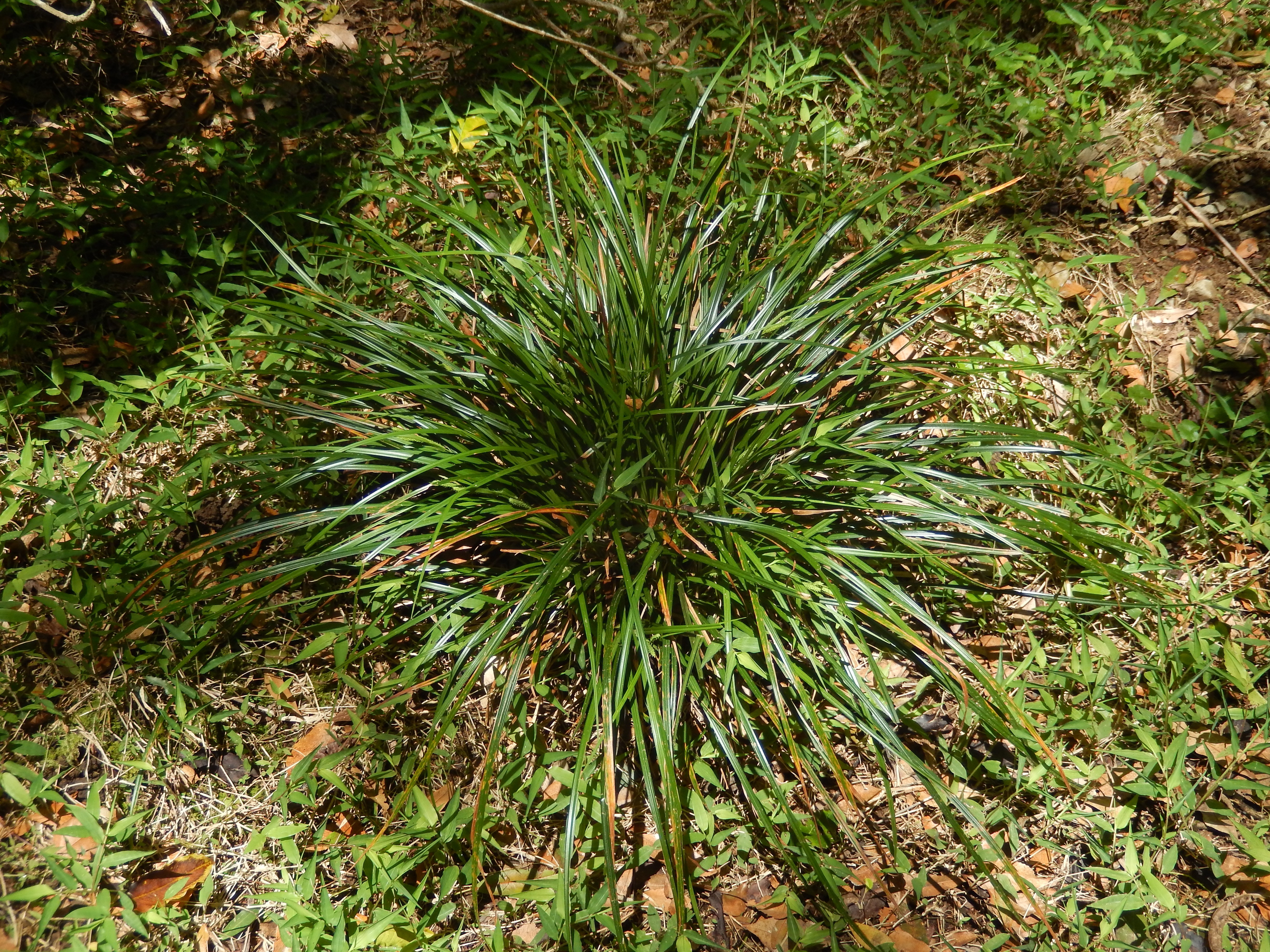
- Mount Banda Banda

Scientific classification
- Kingdom: Plantae
- Clade: Tracheophytes
- Clade: Angiosperms
- Clade: Monocots
- Clade: Commelinids
- Order: Poales
- Family: Cyperaceae
- Genus: Carex
- Species: C. lobolepis

Binomial name
- Carex lobolepis F.Muell.

= Carex lobolepis =

Species of grass-like plant

Carex lobolepis is an Australian species of sedge that was first described in 1874 by Ferdinand von Mueller in his Fragmenta Phytographiae Australiae. This plant is native to moist areas of the coastal mountain ranges and the eastern edges of the tablelands in New South Wales and Queensland.
