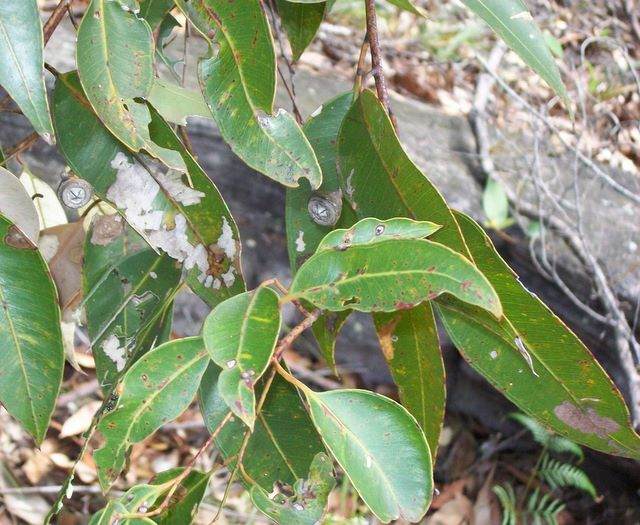
- Eucalyptus scias near Lovett Bay at Ku-ring-gai Chase National Park, Australia
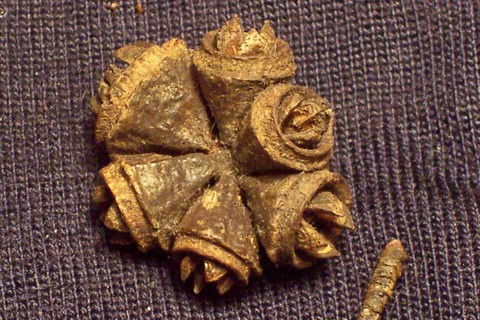
- E. scias ssp. apoda fruit

Conservation status
- Near Threatened (IUCN 3.1)

Scientific classification
- Kingdom: Plantae
- Clade: Tracheophytes
- Clade: Angiosperms
- Clade: Eudicots
- Clade: Rosids
- Order: Myrtales
- Family: Myrtaceae
- Genus: Eucalyptus
- Species: E. scias

Binomial name
- Eucalyptus scias L.A.S.Johnson & K.D.Hill

= Eucalyptus scias =

Large-fruited red mahogany

Species of eucalyptus

Eucalyptus scias, known as the large-fruited red mahogany, is a species of small, straggly to medium-sized tree that is endemic to the high rainfall coastal areas of New South Wales. It has rough, fibrous bark on the trunk and branches, lance-shaped adult leaves, flower buds in groups of three or seven, white flowers and cup-shaped, conical or bell-shaped fruit.

== Description ==
Eucalyptus scias is a straggly tree but one that sometimes grows to a height of 20 m (66 ft), and forms a lignotuber. It has fibrous grey or brown bark in long slabs with shallow longitudinal furrows. Young plants and coppice regrowth have dull green leaves that are paler on the lower surface, broadly lance-shaped, 60–100 mm (2.4–3.9 in) long and 20–45 mm (0.79–1.77 in) wide. Adult leaves are glossy green but paler on the lower surface, lance-shaped to broadly lance-shaped or curved, 70–200 mm (2.8–7.9 in) long and 20–60 mm (0.79–2.36 in) wide, tapering to a petiole 15–27 mm (0.59–1.06 in) long. The flower buds are arranged in leaf axils in groups of three or seven on an unbranched peduncle 5–23 mm (0.20–0.91 in) long, the individual buds sessile or on pedicels up to 8 mm (0.31 in) long. Mature buds are oval to spindle-shaped or diamond-shaped, 11–19 mm (0.43–0.75 in) long and 7–13 mm (0.28–0.51 in) wide with a conical to beaked operculum. Flowering has been recorded from January to February and the flowers are white. The fruit is a woody cup-shaped, conical or bell-shaped capsule 6–10 mm (0.24–0.39 in) long and 10–18 mm (0.39–0.71 in) wide with two ribs on the sides and the valves protruding prominently.

== Taxonomy and naming ==
Eucalyptus scias was first formally described in 1990 by Lawrie Johnson and Ken Hill in the journal Telopea from specimens collected by Ian Brooker in Ku-ring-gai Chase National Park in 1971. The specific epithet (scias) is from the ancient Greek skias meaning "a shade", referring to the broad-leaved crown of this species.

In the same journal, Johnson and Hill described three subspecies, apoda, callimastha and scias. Two of the subspecies have been accepted by the Australian Plant Census:

- Eucalyptus scias subsp. apoda L.A.S.Johnson & K.D.Hill, is commonly known as the Tenterfield red mahogany and is usually a poorly-formed tree with flower buds in groups of three;
- Eucalyptus scias L.A.S.Johnson & K.D.Hillsubsp. scias L.A.S.Johnson & K.D.Hill is a medium-sized tree that has flower buds in groups of seven.

== Distribution and habitat ==
The large-fruited red mahogany grows in forests on soils of medium fertility. Subspecies apoda grows on soils derived from granite on the ranges east of Tenterfield. Subspecies scias is mainly found in near-coastal areas between Cessnock and Narooma.

== Conservation status ==
The IUCN Red List assesses the species as Near threatened.
