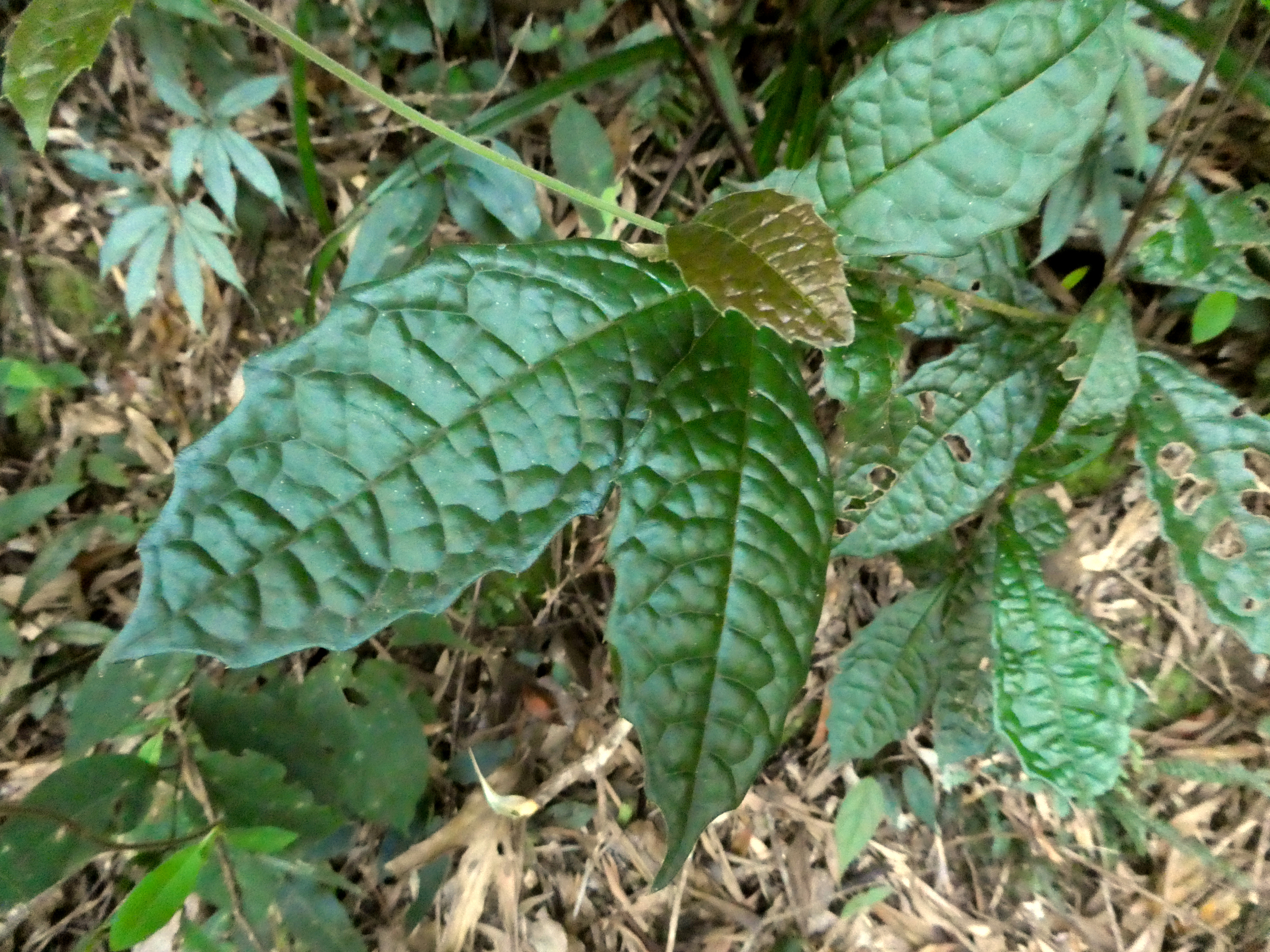
- Growing on the Lamb Range near Cairns, October 2022

Conservation status
- Least Concern (NCA)

Scientific classification
- Kingdom: Plantae
- Clade: Embryophytes
- Clade: Tracheophytes
- Clade: Spermatophytes
- Clade: Angiosperms
- Clade: Eudicots
- Clade: Asterids
- Order: Escalloniales
- Family: Escalloniaceae
- Genus: Polyosma
- Species: P. hirsuta

Binomial name
- Polyosma hirsuta C.T.White
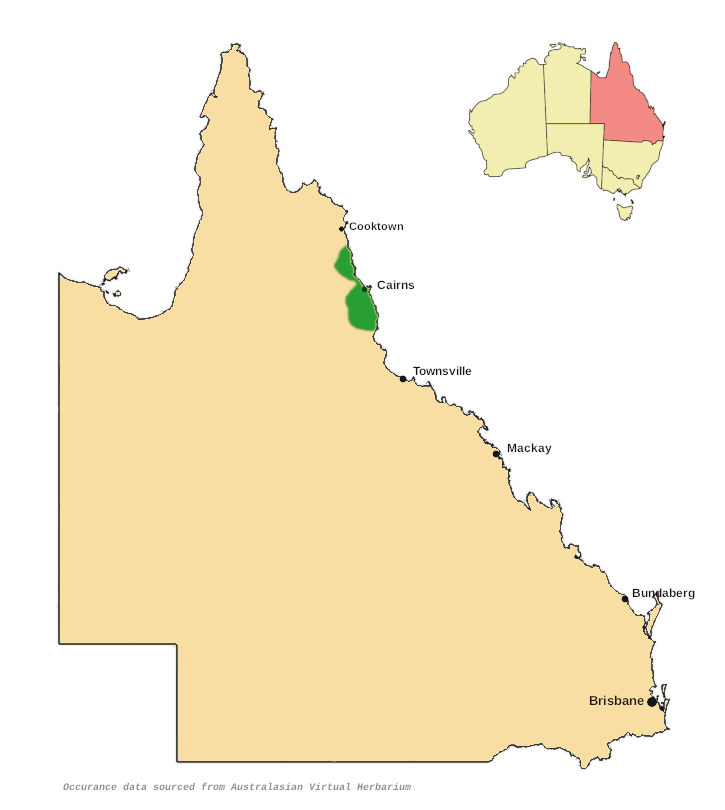

= Polyosma hirsuta =

Hairy Polyosma

Species of flowering plant

Polyosma hirsuta, commonly known as hairy polyosma, is a plant in the family Escalloniaceae which is endemic to northeastern Queensland, Australia.

== Description ==
It is a small evergreen tree growing up to 10 m (33 ft) high. Most parts of the plant, including the twigs, leaves and fruit, are clothed in fine rusty brown hairs. The leaves are up to 14 cm (5.5 in) long and 5 cm (2.0 in) wide, and are ovate to lanceolate in shape. They usually have toothed margins with a short stiff spine at the apex of each tooth. The top surface of the leaves are glossy green, hairy when young but becoming smooth. The undersides have very pronounced veins which are densely covered in pale hairs.

The inflorescence is a raceme (an unbranched spike) produced in the leaf axils or at the ends of branches, and the central stem is covered in fine hairs. The cream-coloured flowers are tubular, about 12 mm (0.47 in) long by 3 mm (0.12 in) wide. They are attached to the inflorescence by a pedicel (flower stalk) about 2 mm (0.08 in) long. The fruit is a rounded or ovoid, dark purple or black berry containing a single seed. The fruit measures about 20 mm × 14 mm (0.79 in × 0.55 in) and the seed about 10 mm × 7 mm (0.39 in × 0.28 in).

== Taxonomy ==
The hairy polyosma was first described in 1918 by the Australian botanist Cyril Tenison White, based on material collected by Norman Michael, an enthusiastic collector of botanic specimens in Queensland. Michael found the plant in the vicinity of the Johnstone River. White's description was published in Botany Bulletin, a publication of the then Queensland Department of Agriculture.

=== Etymology ===
The genus name Polyosma is compounded from the Ancient Greek word poly meaning 'many', and the Latin word osma, meaning 'odour'. The species epithet hirsuta is from the Latin hirsutus meaning 'hairy'.

== Distribution and habitat ==
Polyosma hirsuta is restricted to a small part of northeastern Queensland, on the coast and adjacent highlands from near Cooktown in the north to about Tully in the south. It grows as an understory tree in rainforest on various soils, at altitudes from near sea level to around 1,300 m (4,300 ft).

== Conservation ==
This species is listed by the Queensland Department of Environment and Science as least concern. As of 25 July 2023, it has not been assessed by the International Union for Conservation of Nature (IUCN).

== Gallery ==
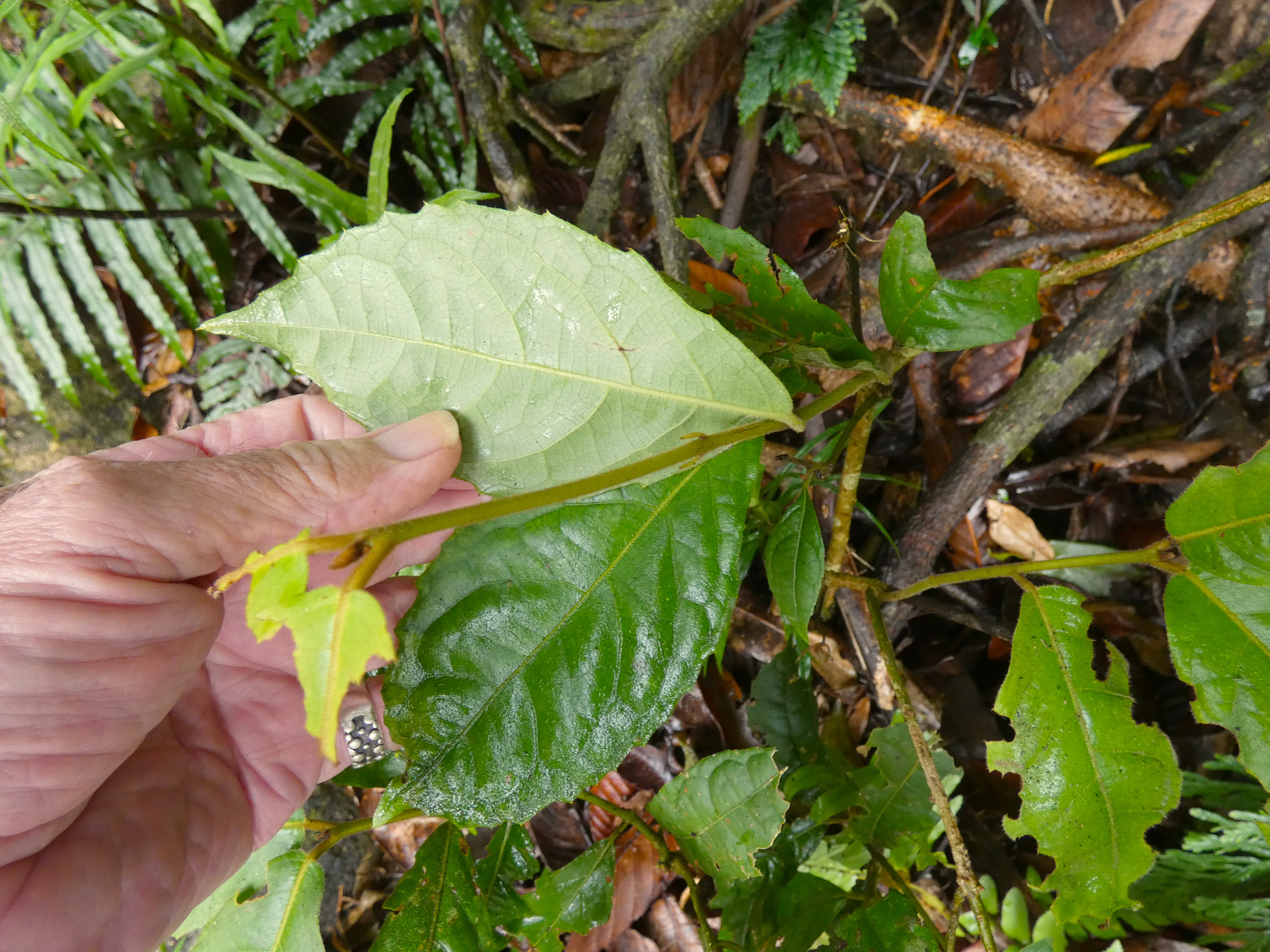
Leaf upper and lower sides

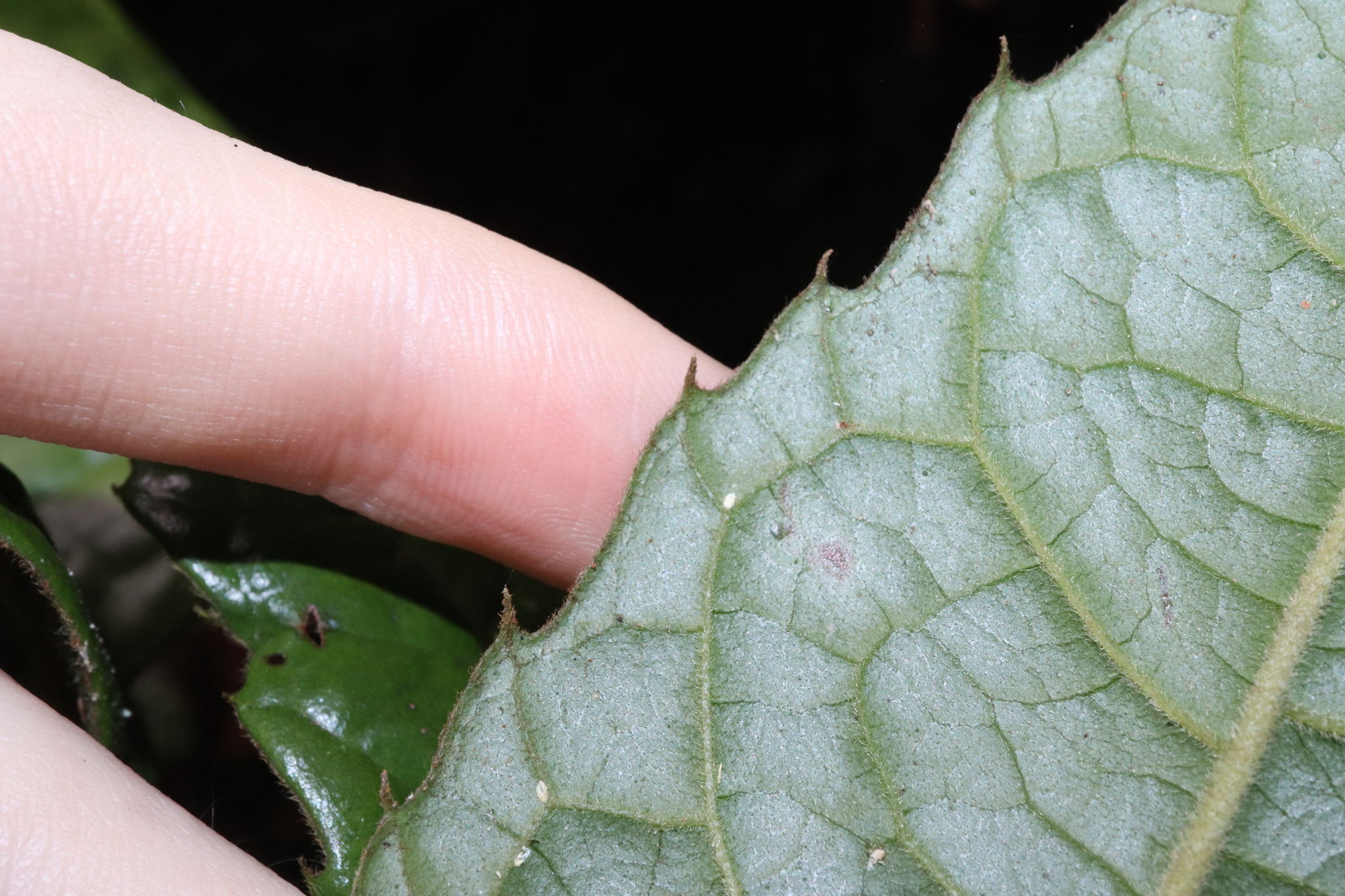
Leaf, showing toothed margins

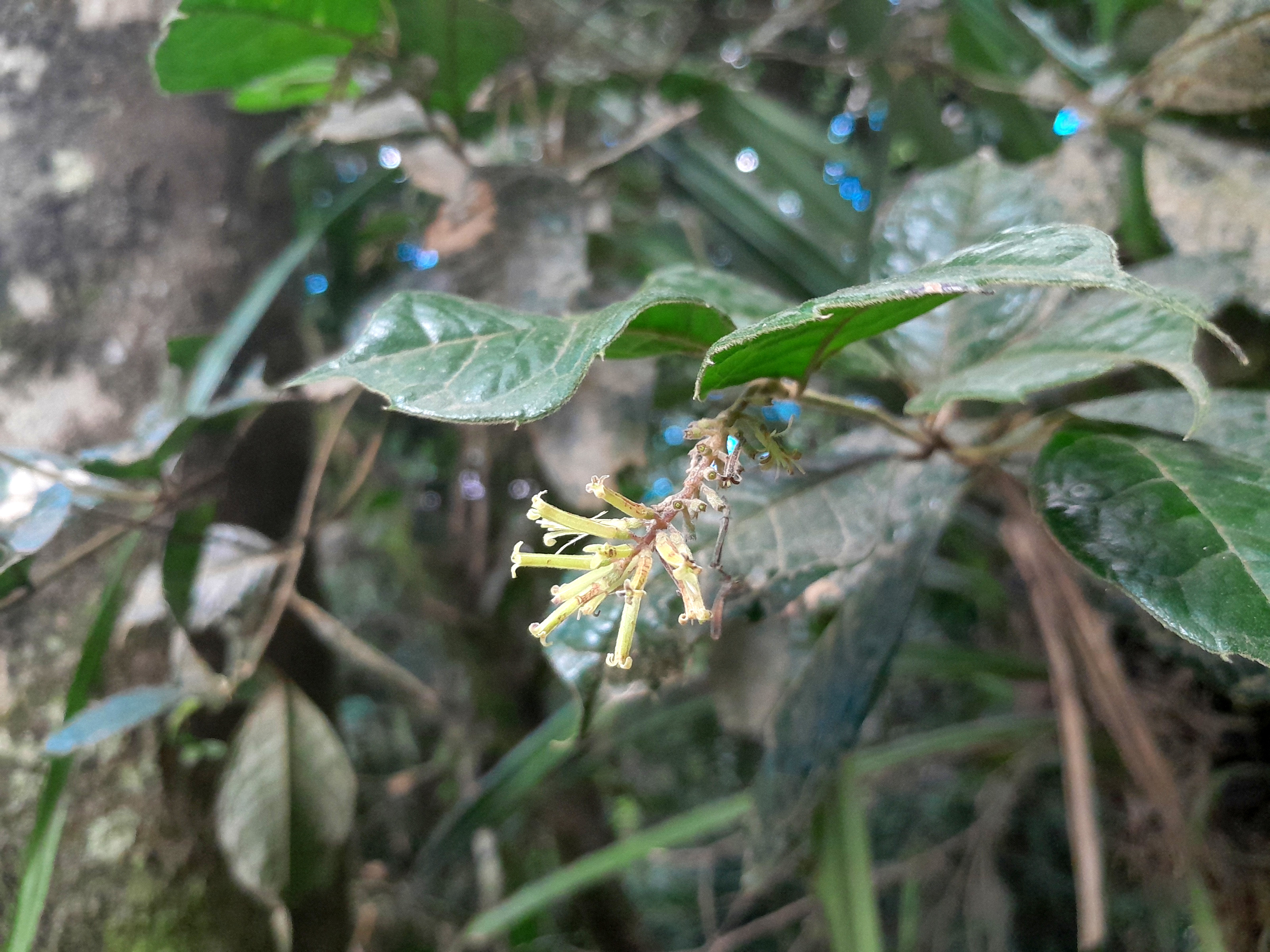
Flowers

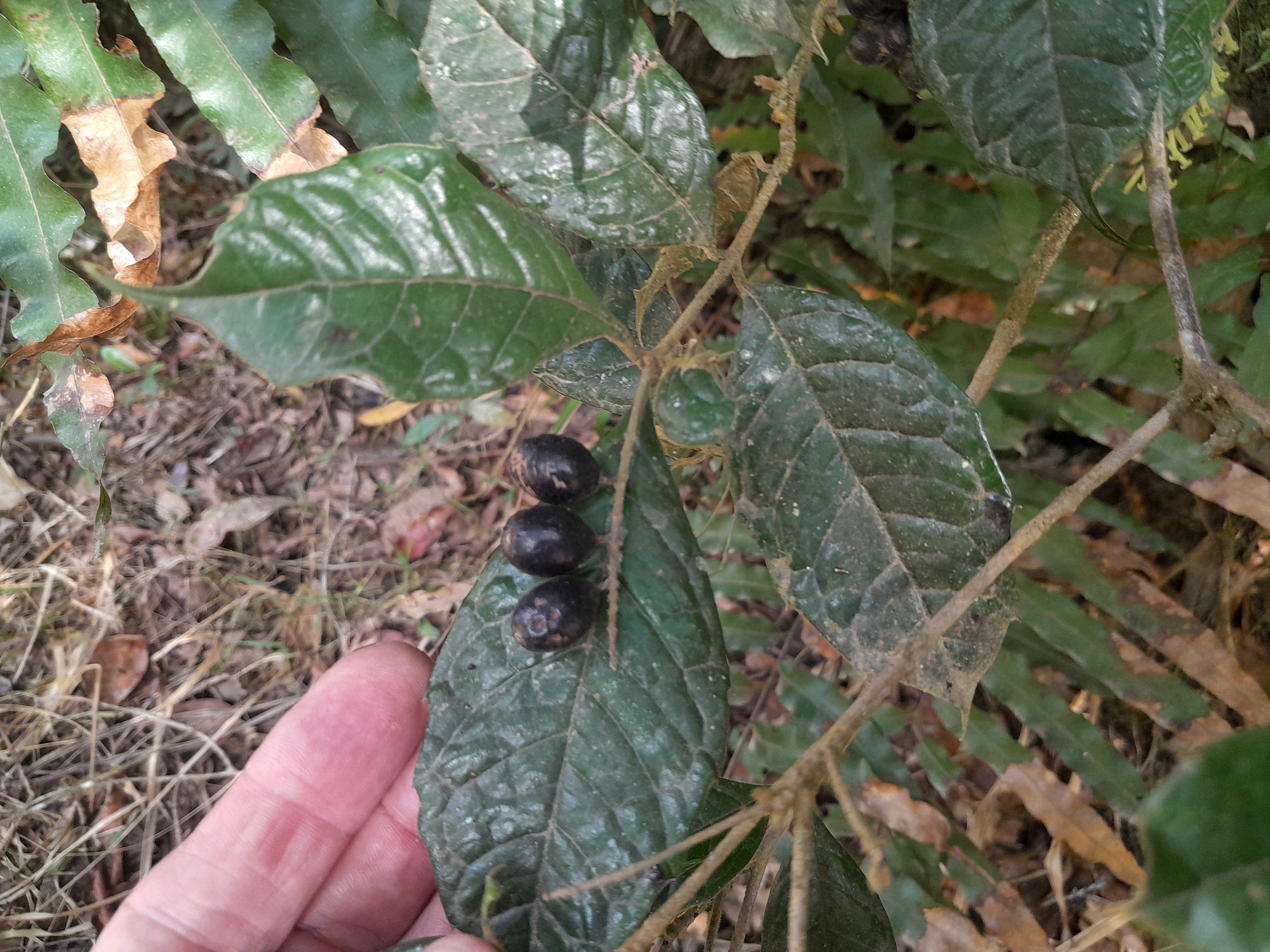
Fruit
