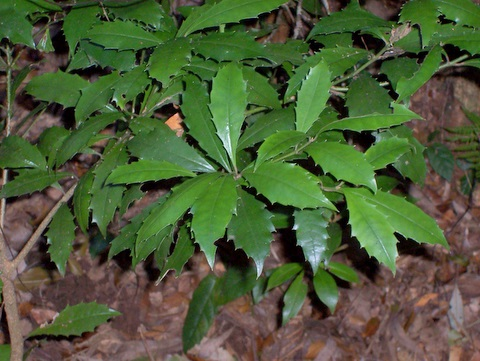
- Polyosma cunninghamii at Mount Banda Banda, Australia

Scientific classification
- Kingdom: Plantae
- Clade: Tracheophytes
- Clade: Angiosperms
- Clade: Eudicots
- Clade: Asterids
- Order: Escalloniales
- Family: Escalloniaceae
- Genus: Polyosma
- Species: P. cunninghamii

Binomial name
- Polyosma cunninghamii Benn.

= Polyosma cunninghamii =

Species of tree

Polyosma cunninghamii, known as the featherwood, is a small rainforest tree of eastern Australia. It grows in many different types of rainforest, however seldom found in the drier rainforests. It is often seen in the cooler rainforests at high altitude. The range of natural distribution is from Kioloa (35° S) near Batemans Bay in southern New South Wales, to Maleny (26° S) in south eastern Queensland.

== Description ==
A tree to 15 metres and a trunk diameter of 25 cm. The dark brown bark has wrinkles and vertical ridges.

Young shoots are hairy towards the leaf buds. Leaves opposite, simple, reverse lanceolate, 5 to 10 cm long with four to six serrations on each side. Leaf stalks around 3 to 6 mm long. The midrib is raised below the leaf, but depressed on the top of the leaf.

Fragrant flowers form in racemes from March to November. White or yellowish/green. The fruit is an attractive black ovate berry, 15 to 20 mm long with longitudinal lines. Fruit matures from March to August, though it can fruit at other times. Eaten by various birds including the green catbird and rose crowned fruit dove. Germination from fresh seed is slow, taking six to ten months.

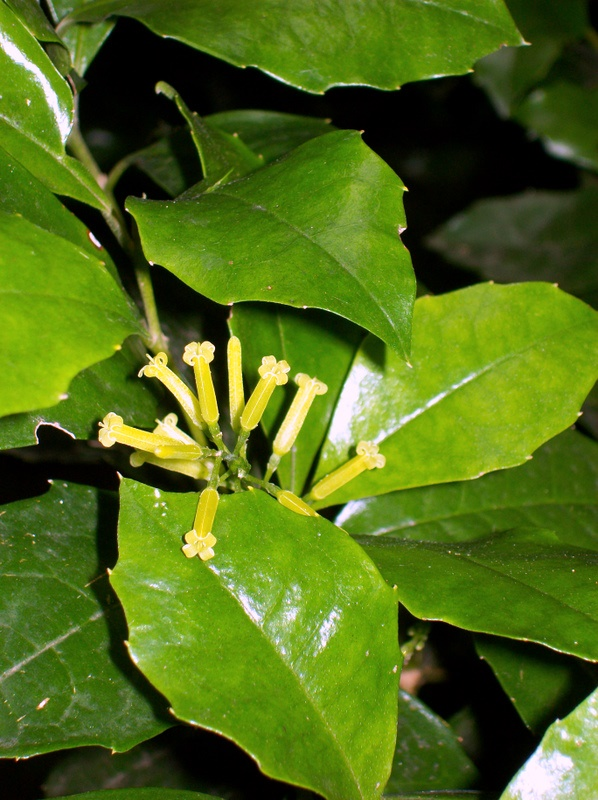
Featherwood in flower, Budderoo National Park, Australia
