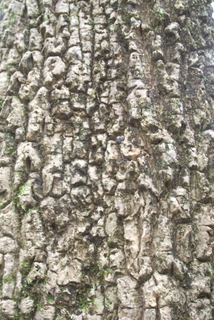
- Corky bark at Mount Banda Banda

Conservation status
- Least Concern (IUCN 3.1)

Scientific classification
- Kingdom: Plantae
- Clade: Embryophytes
- Clade: Tracheophytes
- Clade: Angiosperms
- Clade: Eudicots
- Clade: Rosids
- Order: Oxalidales
- Family: Cunoniaceae
- Genus: Ackama
- Species: A. paniculosa

Binomial name
- Ackama paniculosa (F.Muell.) Heslewood

Synonyms
- 10 synonyms: Ackama muelleri Benth.; Ackama paniculata Engl.; Caldcluvia paniculosa (F.Muell.) Hoogland; Weinmannia paniculata F.Muell.; Weinmannia paniculosa F.Muell.; Windmannia paniculosa (F.Muell.) Kuntze; Ackama mollis Schltr.; Ackama muelleri var. hirsuta Maiden & Betche; Ackama muelleri var. pleiocarpa F.Muell.; Ackama muelleri var. tomentosa Maiden

= Ackama paniculosa =

Soft corkwood

Species of tree

Ackama paniculosa, known as soft corkwood, is a rainforest tree of eastern Australia. It occurs from Ourimbah, Central Coast (New South Wales) at 33° S to Eungella National Park (20° S) in tropical Queensland. Other common names include corkwood, rose-leaf marara, brown alder and sugarbark.

The habitat of Ackama paniculosa includes riverine, littoral, tropical, subtropical and warm temperate rainforests. It is also found in the ecotone of eucalyptus and rainforests. The tree may be identified in the rainforest by the unusually soft corky bark.

== Description ==
A medium to large sized tree with a buttressed base. Sometimes over 40 metres tall and in excess of 90 cm wide at the butt. The trunk is cylindrical with soft corky bark, greyish fawn in colour.

Leaves form in groups of five to seven leaflets, sometimes in threes. Leaves are hairy, opposite and toothed, 5 to 12 cm long. Creamy white flowers form on compound panicles in November. The fruit is a red capsule, containing a few hairy oval flattened seeds, 1 mm long. The fruit matures from February to June.

== Taxonomy ==
The species has a complex nomenclatural history. It was first described by Ferdinand von Mueller in 1860 under the name Weinmannia paniculata F.Muell. However, this combination had already been published in 1797 by Antonio José Cavanilles for a Chilean species. Realizing his error, Mueller in 1861 published the replacement name Weinmannia paniculosa F.Muell., which is the correct basionym (base name) for this species. When Heinrich Gustav Adolf Engler moved the species to the genus Ackama in 1891, he incorrectly used Mueller's earlier illegitimate name as the basis, calling the species Ackama paniculata Eng. In 1947, the combination Ackama paniculosa Beuzev. & C.T.White was put forward, but incorrectly, as there was no reference to Mueller's legitimate basionym. The species continued to be placed in Ackama, but without a legitimate name.

In 1979, when Ruurd Dirk Hoogland transferred all the species of Ackama to Caldcluvia, he correctly used the name Caldcluvia paniculosa (F.Muell.) Hoogland. In 2013, transfer back to Ackama was proposed, and a valid name in this genus, Ackama paniculosa (F.Muell.) Heslewood, was published for the first time by Margaret M. Heslewood and Peter G. Wilson.
