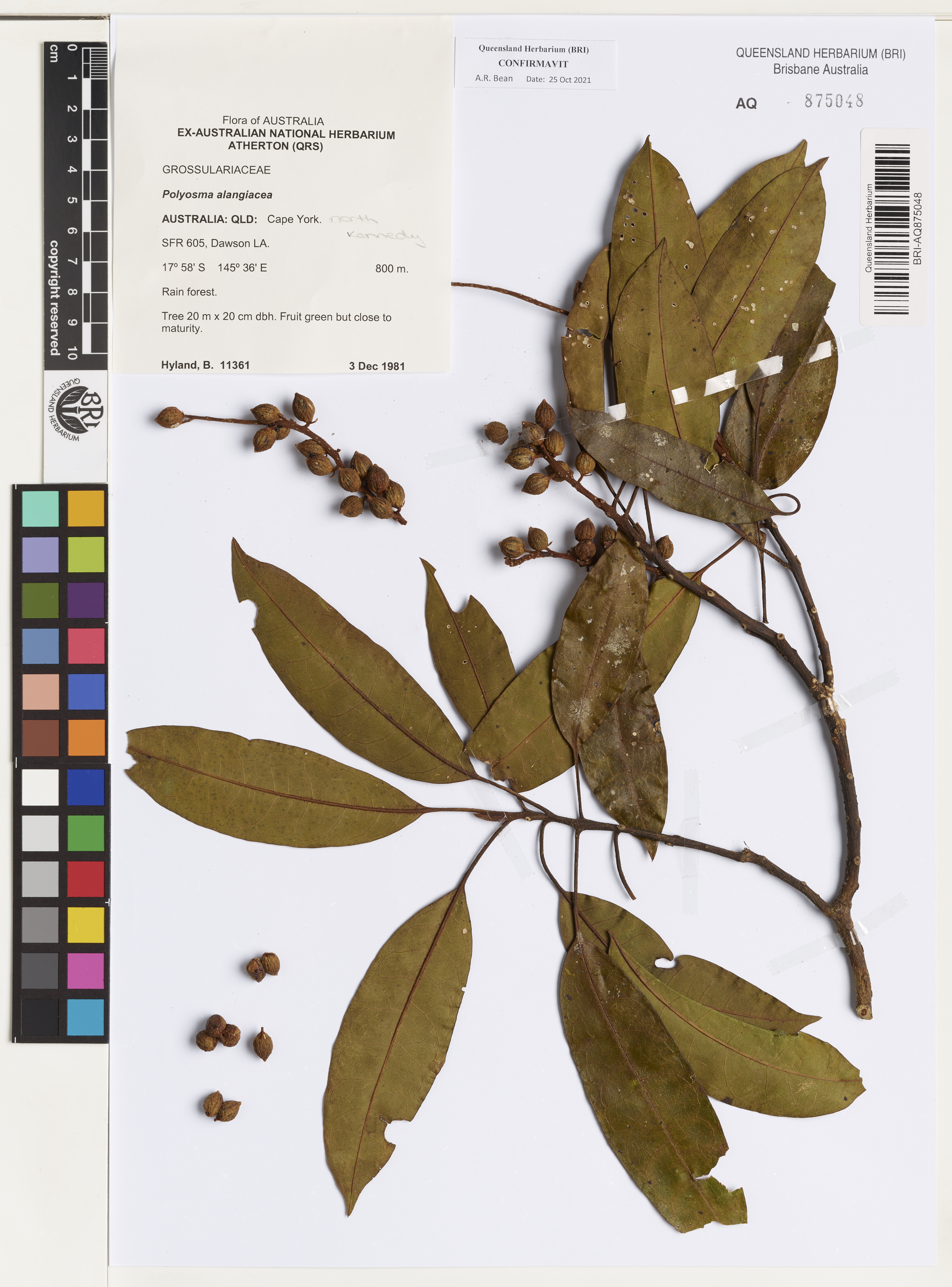
- Herbarium specimen

Conservation status
- Least Concern (NCA)

Scientific classification
- Kingdom: Plantae
- Clade: Tracheophytes
- Clade: Angiosperms
- Clade: Eudicots
- Clade: Asterids
- Order: Escalloniales
- Family: Escalloniaceae
- Genus: Polyosma
- Species: P. alangiacea

Binomial name
- Polyosma alangiacea F.Muell.

= Polyosma alangiacea =

White alder

Species of flowering plant

Polyosma alangiacea, commonly known as white alder, is a tree in the family Escalloniaceae which is endemic to northeast Queensland. It was first described in 1872.

== Distribution and habitat ==
The natural range of this species is the sub-coastal ranges of northeast Queensland from near Cooktown south to the area around Eungella, west of Mackay. It grows in well developed rainforest at altitudes from 400 to 1,200 m (1,300 to 3,900 ft), on volcanic soils (derived from basalt or granite).

== Conservation ==
The white alder has been given the status of least concern by Queensland's Department of Environment, Science and Innovation. As of 31 January 2024, it has not been assessed by the International Union for Conservation of Nature (IUCN).
