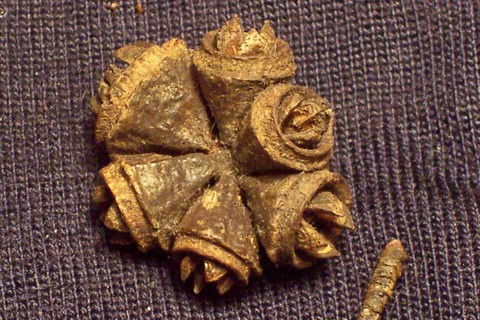
- Eucalyptus scias subsp. apoda at Mount Banda Banda, at 1200 metres above sea level, this photo identified by Alexander Floyd

Conservation status
- Vulnerable (EPBC Act)

Scientific classification
- Kingdom: Plantae
- Clade: Tracheophytes
- Clade: Angiosperms
- Clade: Eudicots
- Clade: Rosids
- Order: Myrtales
- Family: Myrtaceae
- Genus: Eucalyptus
- Species: E. scias
- Subspecies: E. s. subsp. apoda

Trinomial name
- Eucalyptus scias subsp. apoda L.A.S.Johnson & K.D.Hill

= Eucalyptus scias subsp. apoda =

Subspecies of eucalyptus

Eucalyptus scias subsp. apoda is a rare Eucalyptus, growing at high altitudes in north-eastern New South Wales.
