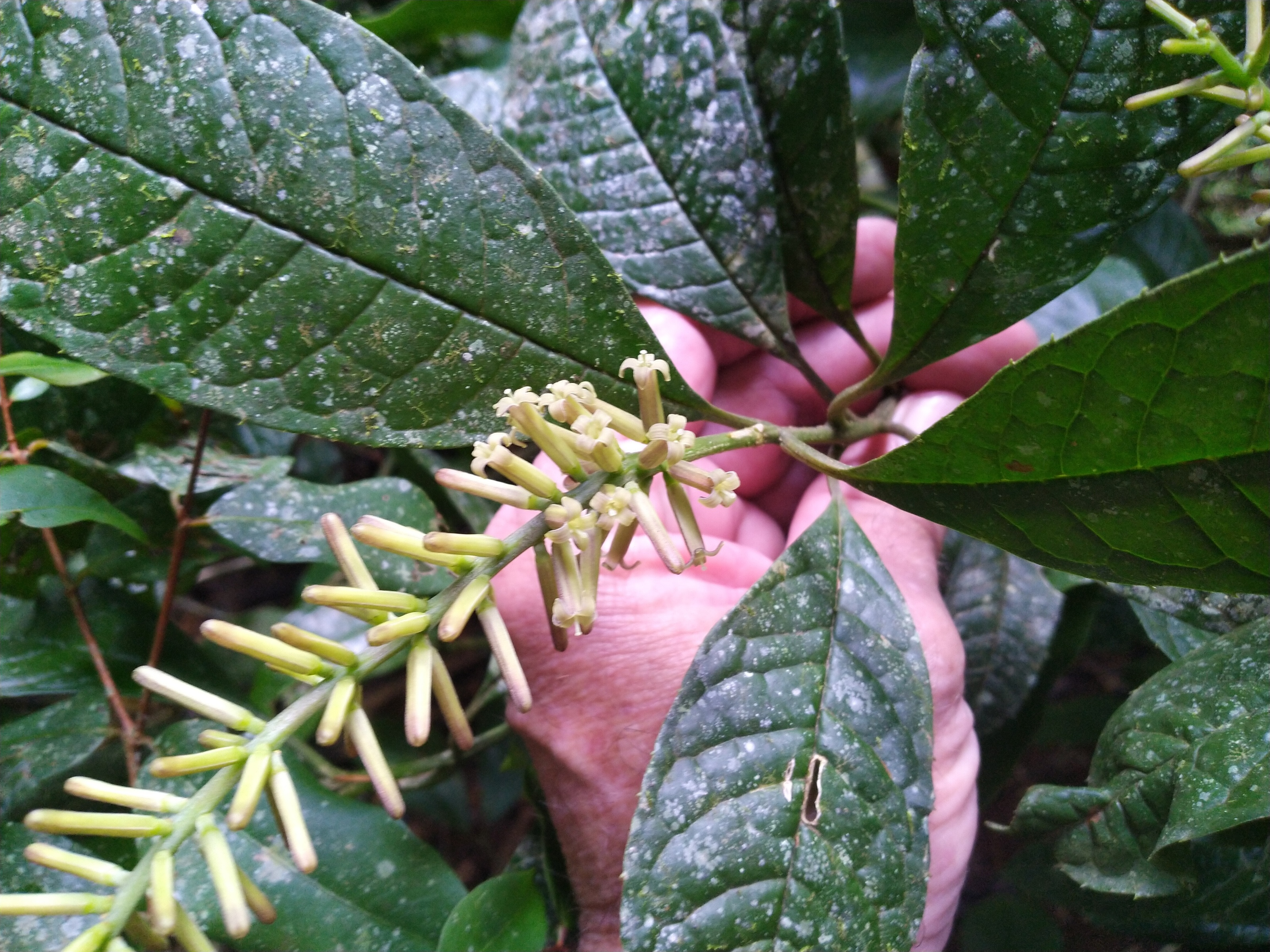
- In rainforest near Malanda, Sept 2022

Conservation status
- Least Concern (NCA)
- Least Concern (IUCN 3.1)

Scientific classification
- Kingdom: Plantae
- Clade: Embryophytes
- Clade: Tracheophytes
- Clade: Angiosperms
- Clade: Eudicots
- Clade: Asterids
- Order: Escalloniales
- Family: Escalloniaceae
- Genus: Polyosma
- Species: P. rhytophloia

Binomial name
- Polyosma rhytophloia C.T.White & W.D.Francis

= Polyosma rhytophloia =

Wrinkled bark polyosma

Species of flowering plant

Polyosma rhytophloia, commonly known as wrinkled bark polyosma, is a plant in the family Escalloniaceae endemic to parts of eastern Queensland, Australia. It was first described in 1926.

== Description ==
Polyosma rhytophloia is a small evergreen tree growing up to 11 m (36 ft) high with a greenish/grey trunk measuring up to 15 cm (5.9 in) diameter. The glabrous, or hairless, leaves are elliptic to oblanceolate, with a cuneate base, an acuminate tip and a serrated margin. The lateral veins on either side of the midrib number from 6 to 12, and are conspicuous on both surfaces of the blade.

The inflorescence is a raceme (an unbranched spike) produced in the leaf axils or at the ends of branches. The cream/purple flowers are tubular, about 12 mm (0.47 in) long by 3 mm (0.12 in) wide. The fruit is a rounded or ovoid, dark purple or black berry containing a single seed. The fruit measures about 12 mm × 10 mm (0.47 in × 0.39 in) and the seed about 9 mm × 7 mm (0.35 in × 0.28 in).

== Taxonomy ==
The wrinkled-bark polyosma was first described by the Australian botanists Cyril Tenison White and William Douglas Francis, based on specimens collected near Eungella and on the Atherton Tableland. Their paper, titled "Contributions to the Queensland Flora, No. 3", was read to the Royal Society of Queensland in 1925 and subsequently published in the Society's journal Proceedings of the Royal Society of Queensland in 1926.

=== Alternate spelling ===
In the Australian Plant Name Index, Plants of the World Online, and the IUCN Redlist, this species is treated as Polyosma rhytiphloia (note the alternate spelling in the epithet), despite it being originally published as rhytophloia. Bean & Forster argue that "The species epithet rhytophloia (meaning wrinkled bark) is derived from the Greek, and hence the correct connecting vowel is -o-".

=== Etymology ===
The genus name Polyosma is compounded from the Ancient Greek word poly meaning 'many', and the Latin word osma, meaning 'odour' or 'smell'. The species epithet rhytophloia is created from the Ancient Greek words ῥυτίς (rhutís), 'wrinkle', and φλόος (phlóos), 'bark'.

== Distribution and habitat ==
The native range of this species is coastal and sub-coastal ranges of eastern Queensland, from near Cooktown to the area around Eungella, west of Mackay. It grows as an understory tree in rainforest, at altitudes from about 520 to 1,300 m (1,710 to 4,270 ft).

== Conservation ==
This species is listed by both the International Union for Conservation of Nature (IUCN) and the Queensland Government Department of Environment and Science as least concern. In support of their assessment, IUCN states that the species has a wide distribution and there are no identified threats either current or foreseen.

== Gallery ==
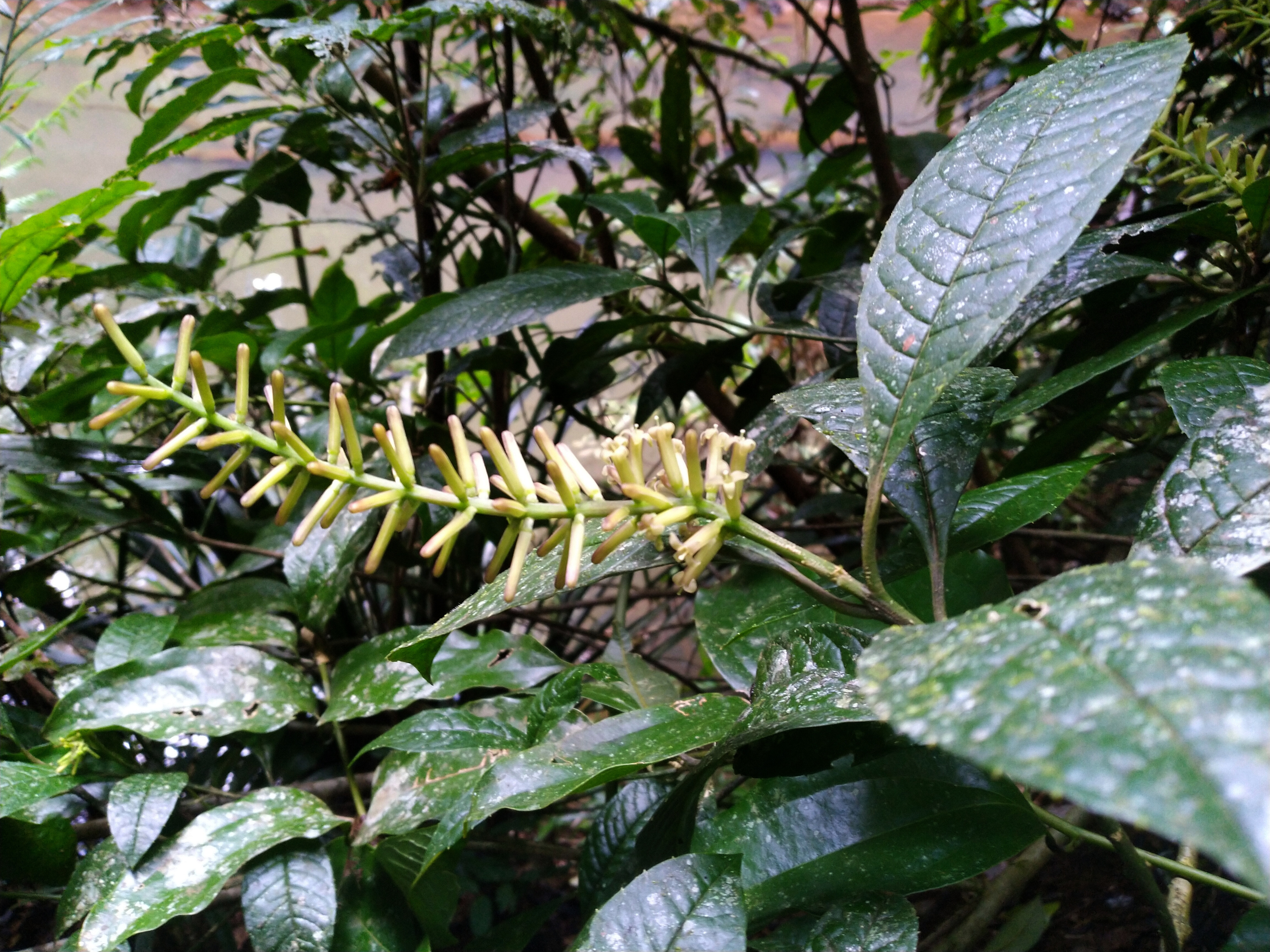
Flower buds

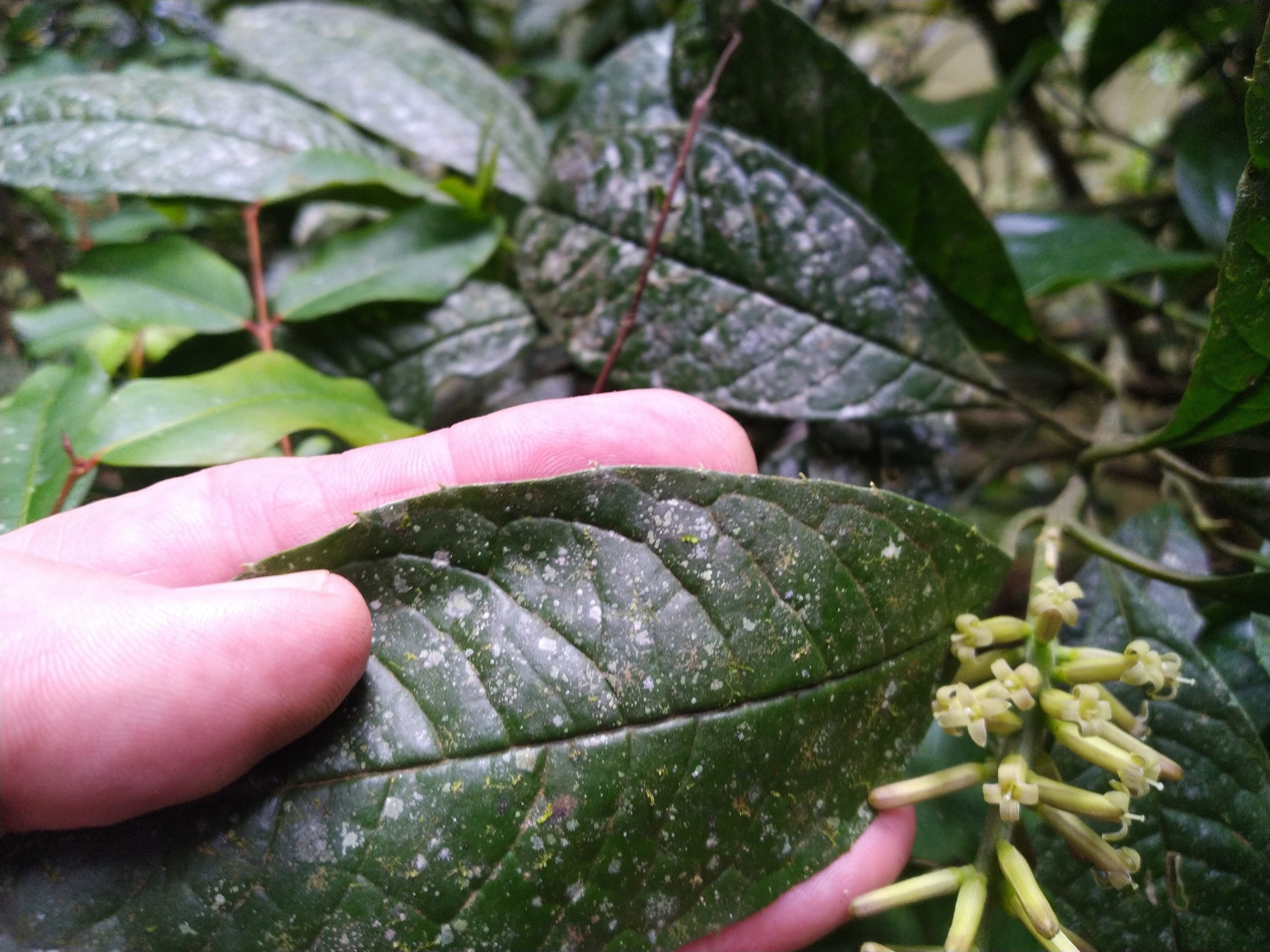
Leaf margin

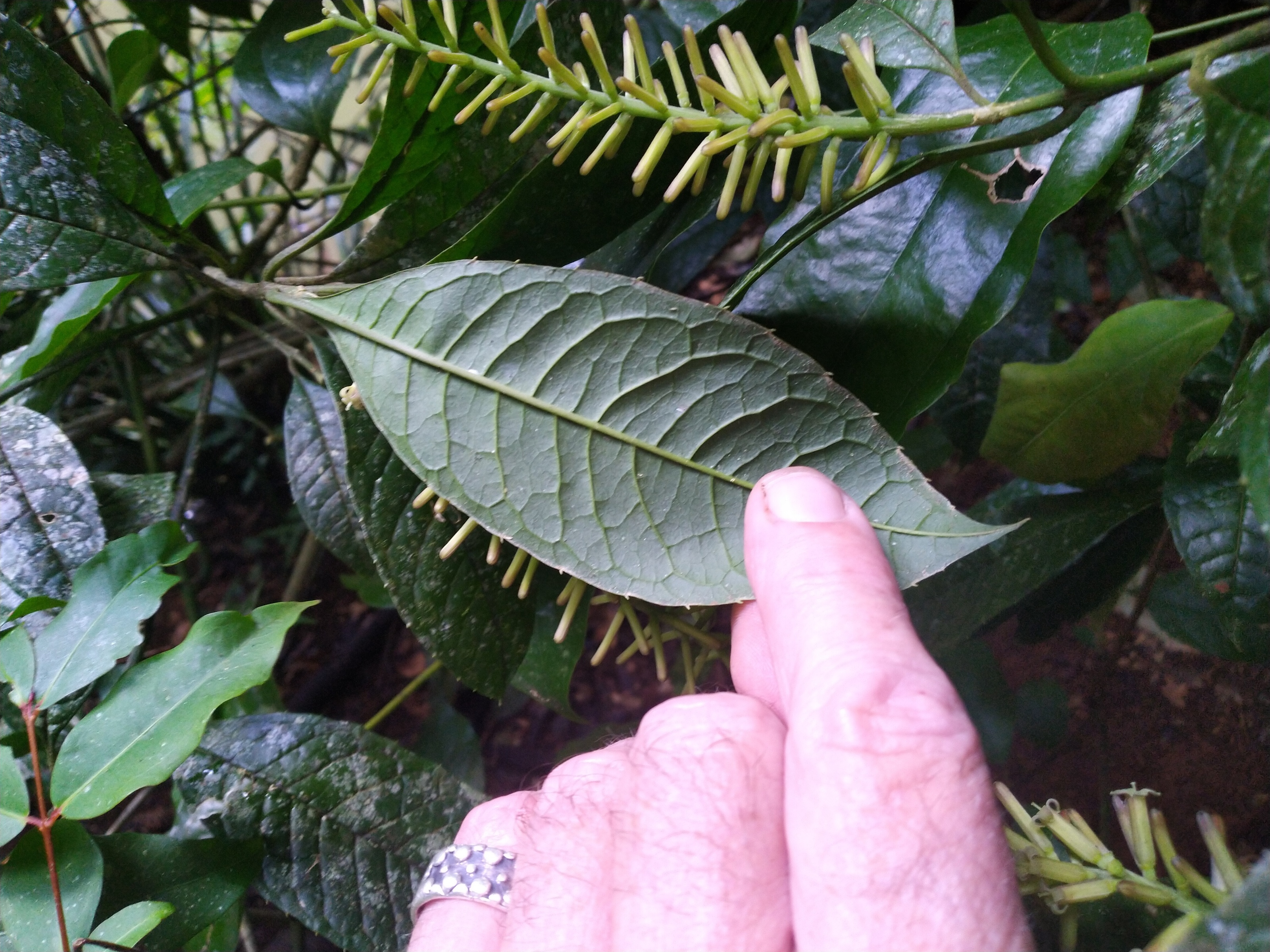
Leaf underside
