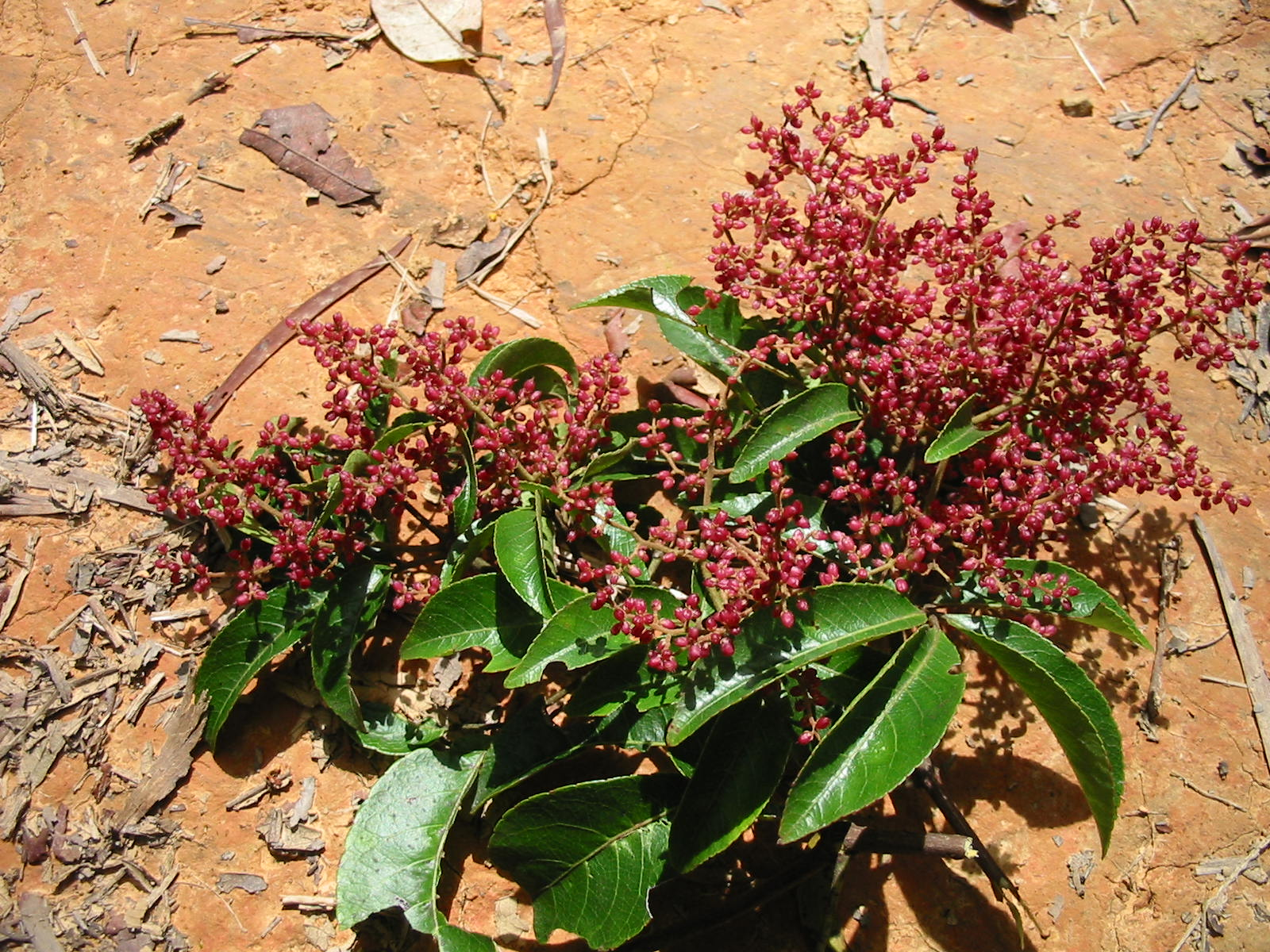
- Ackama australiensis

Scientific classification
- Kingdom: Plantae
- Clade: Tracheophytes
- Clade: Angiosperms
- Clade: Eudicots
- Clade: Rosids
- Order: Oxalidales
- Family: Cunoniaceae
- Genus: Ackama; A.Cunn.

Species
- See text

Synonyms
- Betchea Schltr.; Dirhynchosia Blume; Spiraeopsis Miq.

= Ackama =

Genus of flowering plants

Ackama is a genus of flowering plants in the family Cunoniaceae, native to parts of Southeast Asia, Australia and New Zealand. It was first described by Allan Cunningham in 1839.

Members of this genus are trees with imparipinnate leaves, paniculate inflorescences and capsular fruit. Some produce a useful timber.

The native range of the genus includes the Philippines, Maluku, New Guiinea including the Bismarck Archipelago, the Solomon Islands, the Australian states of Queensland and New South Wales, and New Zealand.

== Species ==
As of May 2026, Plants of the World Online accepted the following 10 species:

- Ackama australiensis (Schltr.) C.T.White
- Ackama brassii (L.M.Perry) Pillon & H.C.Hopkins
- Ackama celebica (Blume) Pillon & H.C.Hopkins
- Ackama clemensiae (L.M.Perry) Pillon & H.C.Hopkins
- Ackama fulva (Schltr.) Pillon & H.C.Hopkins
- Ackama nubicola de Lange
- Ackama paniculosa (F.Muell.) Heslewood
- Ackama papuana Pulle
- Ackama rosifolia A.Cunn.
- Ackama rufa (Schltr.) Pillon & H.C.Hopkins
