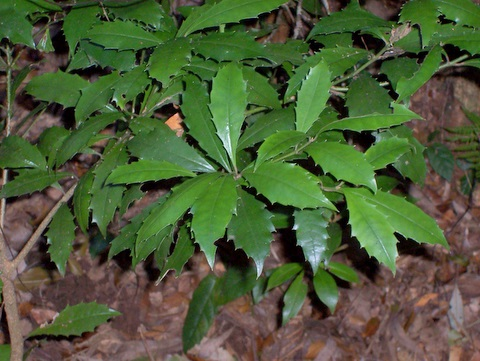
- Polyosma cunninghamii

Scientific classification
- Kingdom: Plantae
- Clade: Tracheophytes
- Clade: Angiosperms
- Clade: Eudicots
- Clade: Asterids
- Order: Escalloniales
- Family: Escalloniaceae
- Genus: Polyosma; Blume

Species
- About 90; see text.

= Polyosma =

Genus of trees

Polyosma is a genus of about 90 species of trees native to south-east Asia. They occur from China south through south-east Asia to the east coast of Australia, New Guinea, the Solomon Islands and New Caledonia.

Its taxonomic placement has long been uncertain: it was traditionally placed in Grossulariaceae, but in the APG II system it was given its own family, Polyosmaceae, which was unplaced as to order within the euasterids II (campanulids) clade. However, the current APG IV system places the genus in the family Escalloniaceae.

The following is an alphabetical listing of the 91 species in this genus that are accepted by Plants of the World Online as of 27 July 2023.

- Polyosma adangensis Craib
- Polyosma alangiacea F.Muell.
- Polyosma amygdaloides Reeder
- Polyosma annamensis Gagnep.
- Polyosma blaoensis O.Lecompte
- Polyosma borneensis Schltr.
- Polyosma brachystachys Schltr.
- Polyosma bracteosa Stapf
- Polyosma buxea Mattf.
- Polyosma cambodiana Gagnep.
- Polyosma cestroides Schltr.
- Polyosma collina Saw
- Polyosma coriacea King
- Polyosma crassifolia Kaneh. & Hatus.
- Polyosma cunninghamii Benn.
- Polyosma cyanoides Saw
- Polyosma dentata Schltr.
- Polyosma dewildei Saw
- Polyosma discolor Baill.
- Polyosma dolichocarpa Merr.
- Polyosma fasciculata Ridl.
- Polyosma finisterrae Schltr.
- Polyosma forbesii Valeton ex Lauterb.
- Polyosma fragrans (Wall.) Benn.
- Polyosma fulva Saw
- Polyosma gigantea Baker f.
- Polyosma gitingensis Elmer
- Polyosma glabrescens Saw
- Polyosma glaucescens Ridl.
- Polyosma globosa A.R.Bean & P.I.Forst.
- Polyosma grandiflora Saw
- Polyosma grandis Ridl.
- Polyosma heliciiformis Kaneh. & Hatus.
- Polyosma helicioides F.Muell.
- Polyosma hirsuta C.T.White
- Polyosma hookeri Stapf
- Polyosma ilicifolia Blume
- Polyosma induta Reeder
- Polyosma integrifolia Blume
- Polyosma kingiana Schltr.
- Polyosma kouaouana Pillon
- Polyosma laetevirens Griff. ex C.B.Clarke
- Polyosma lagunensis Merr.
- Polyosma latifolia Schltr.
- Polyosma leratii Guillaumin
- Polyosma linearibractea Merr.
- Polyosma longebracteolata O.C.Schmidt
- Polyosma longepedicellata King
- Polyosma macrobotrys Mattf.
- Polyosma maliauensis Saw
- Polyosma matangensis Saw
- Polyosma melanophylla Saw
- Polyosma mjoebergii Merr.
- Polyosma mucronata Reeder
- Polyosma murudensis Saw
- Polyosma nhatrangensis Gagnep.
- Polyosma nigrescens A.R.Bean & P.I.Forst.
- Polyosma nullii B.C.Stone
- Polyosma occulta Reeder
- Polyosma oligantha Reeder
- Polyosma oligodonta Merr.
- Polyosma pancheriana Baill.
- Polyosma parviflora King
- Polyosma parvifolia Saw
- Polyosma penibukanensis Heine
- Polyosma philippinensis Merr.
- Polyosma pilosa Esser
- Polyosma piperi Merr.
- Polyosma pseudobracteosa Schulze-Menz ex Saw
- Polyosma pubescens Ridl.
- Polyosma pulgarensis Elmer
- Polyosma rampae W.N.Takeuchi
- Polyosma reducta F.Muell.
- Polyosma retusa C.B.Rob.
- Polyosma rhytophloia C.T.White & W.D.Francis
- Polyosma ridleyi King
- Polyosma rigidiuscula F.Muell. & F.M.Bailey
- Polyosma robusta (Ridl.) Saw
- Polyosma scortechinii King
- Polyosma spicata Baill.
- Polyosma stenosiphon Schltr.
- Polyosma subalpina Schulze-Menz ex P.Royen
- Polyosma subintegrifolia (Guill.) Pillon
- Polyosma torricellensis Schltr.
- Polyosma trimeniifolia Kaneh. & Hatus.
- Polyosma turfosa Gagnep.
- Polyosma urdanetensis Elmer
- Polyosma verticillata Merr.
- Polyosma villosa Merr.
- Polyosma vochysioides Reeder
- Polyosma wallichii Benn.
