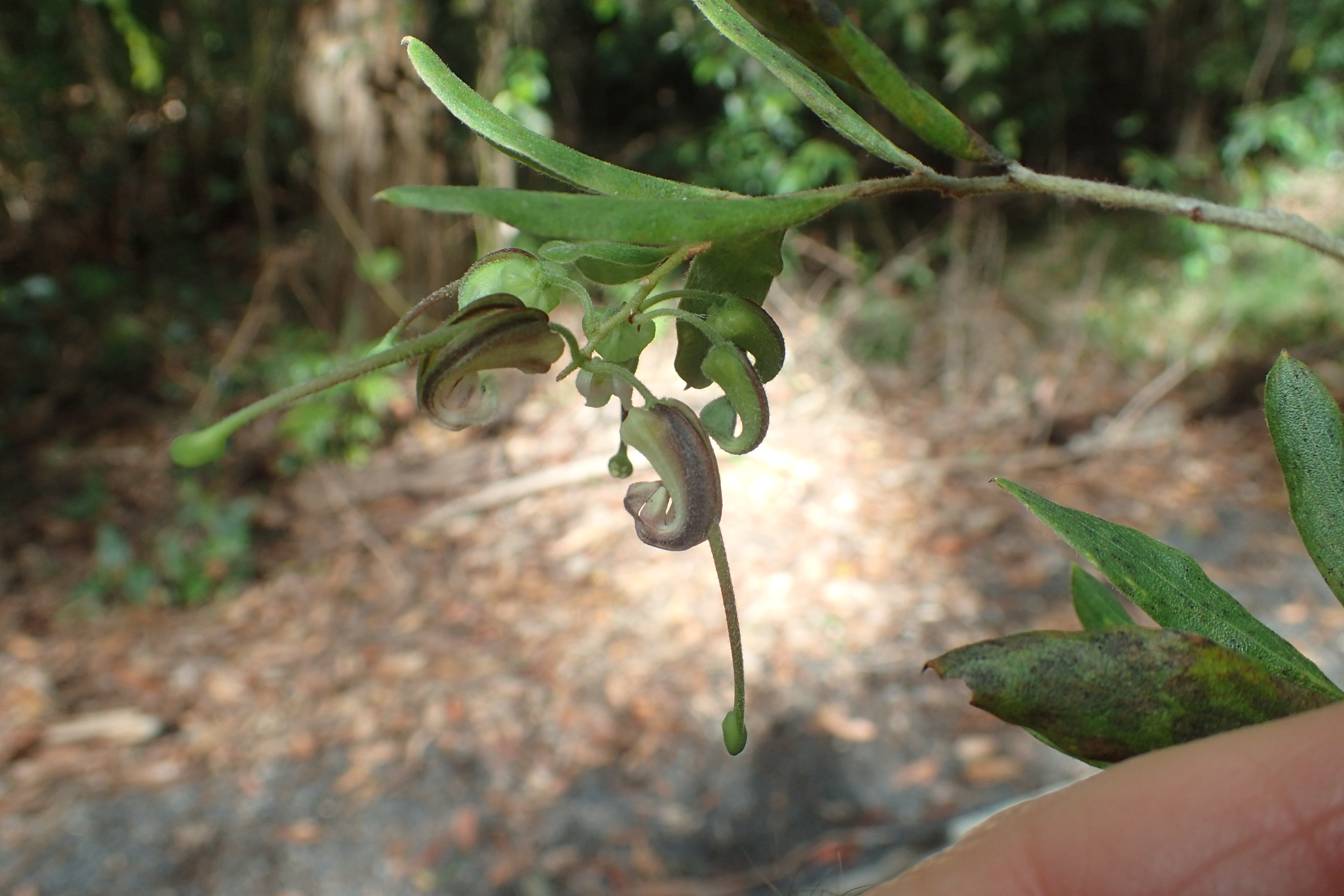

Conservation status
- Endangered (IUCN 3.1)

- Endangered (EPBC Act)

Scientific classification
- Kingdom: Plantae
- Clade: Tracheophytes
- Clade: Angiosperms
- Clade: Eudicots
- Order: Proteales
- Family: Proteaceae
- Genus: Grevillea
- Species: G. guthrieana

Binomial name
- Grevillea guthrieana Olde & Marriott

= Grevillea guthrieana =

Species of shrub endemic to Western Australia

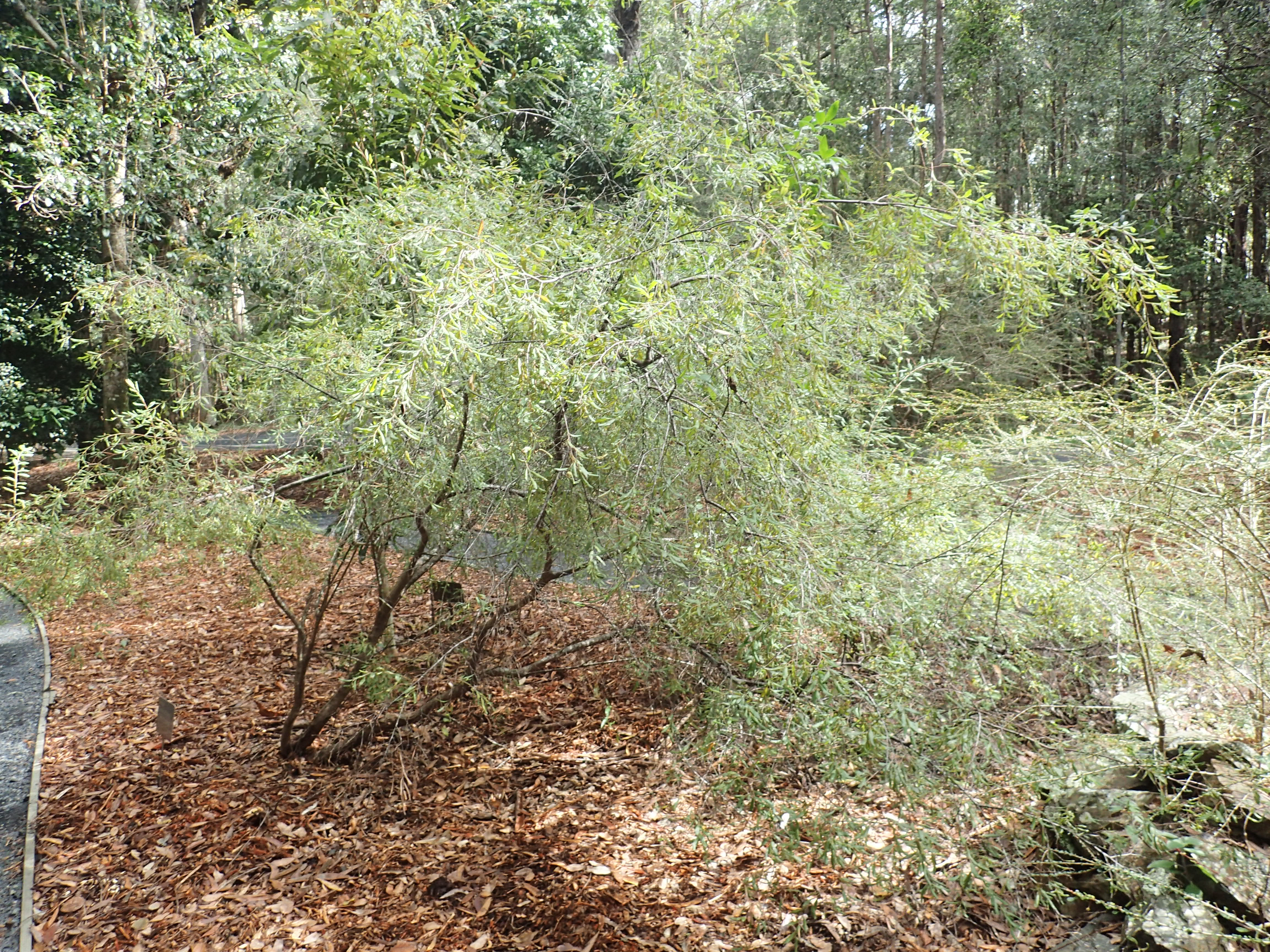
Habit in the Coffs Harbour Botanic Garden

Grevillea guthrieana, commonly known as Guthrie's grevillea, is a species of flowering plant in the family Proteaceae and is endemic to New South Wales. It is a spreading shrub with oblong leaves and clusters of two to six green and maroon flowers.

== Description ==
Grevillea guthrieana is an open, erect shrub, that typically grows to a height of 1–4.5 m (3 ft 3 in – 14 ft 9 in). Its leaves are oblong, 20–60 mm (0.79–2.36 in) long and 4–9 mm (0.16–0.35 in) wide, the upper surface rough to the touch and the lower surface with shaggy hairs pressed against the surface. The flowers are arranged on the ends of branches in loose clusters of two to six on a rachis 2–6 mm (0.079–0.236 in) long. The flowers are light green and maroon, the pistil 25–26 mm (0.98–1.02 in) long. Flowering occurs from August to October and the fruit is a narrowly elliptic follicle about 20 mm (0.79 in) long, and ridged with a few woolly hairs.

== Taxonomy ==
Grevillea guthrieana was first formally described in 1994 by Peter M. Olde and Neil R. Marriott in the journal Telopea from specimens collected by Olde near Booral in 1992. The specific epithet (guthrieana) honours Christine Guthrie, for her assistance to the authors.

== Distribution and habitat ==
Guthrie's grevillea grows in moist forest in three disjunct populations near Booral, near Mount Banda Banda and on the Carrai Plateau west of Kempsey. There is estimated to be a population of more than 10,000 of these plants in the wild, with 5,000 estimated to be near Booral Creek, 5,000 estimated to be on the Carrai Plateau and around 200 estimated to be growing in a small population near Mount Banda Banda.

== Conservation status ==
Grevillea guthrieana is listed as endangered on the IUCN Red List of Threatened Species, under the Australian Government Environment Protection and Biodiversity Conservation Act 1999 and under the New South Wales Government Biodiversity Conservation Act 2016. It occurs within a restricted distribution with an extent of occurrence of 4,630 km^{2} (1,790 sq mi) and its population is severely fragmented. The main threats to the species include weed invasion, road construction and maintenance, and grazing.

== See also ==
- List of Grevillea species
