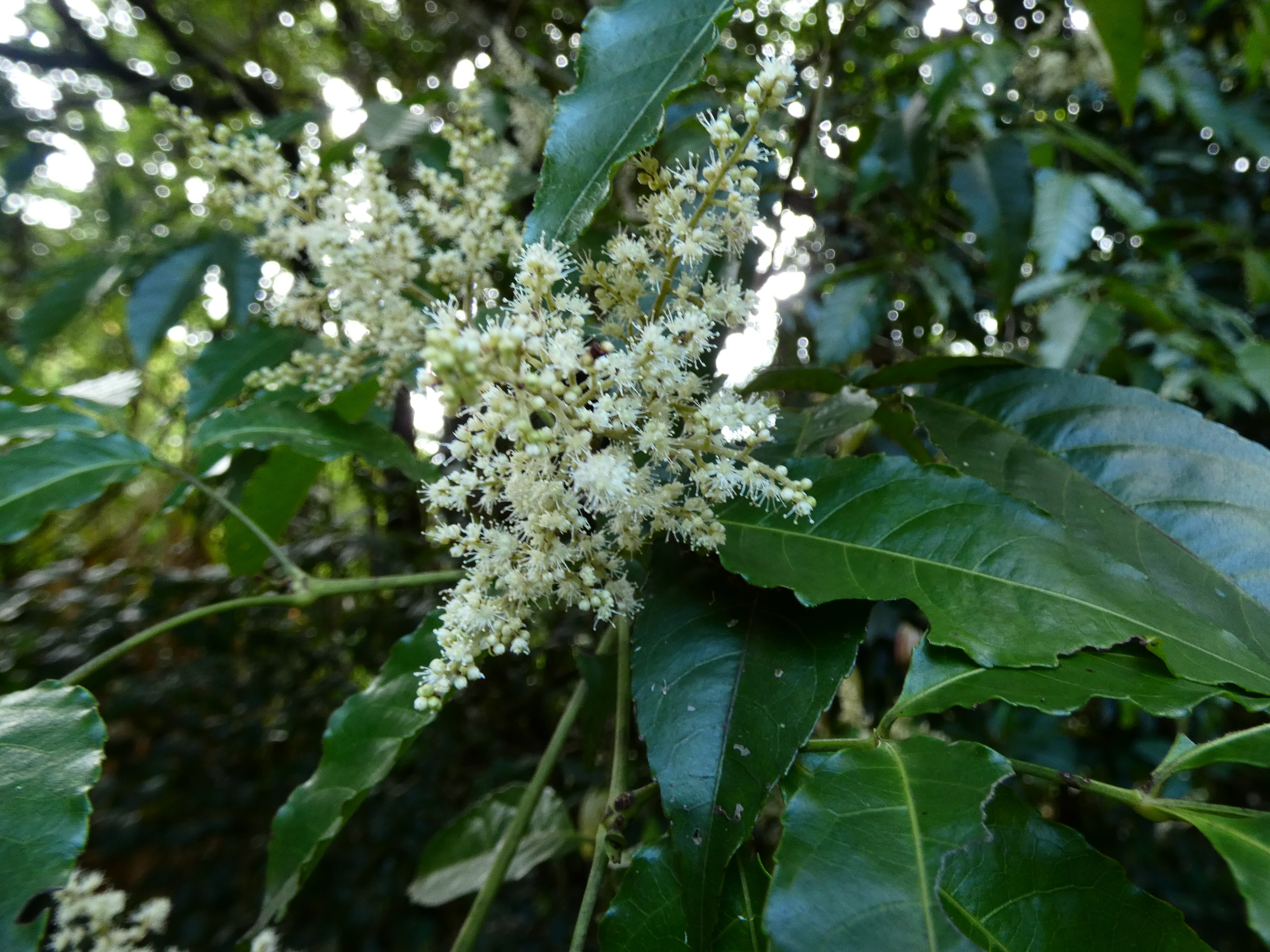
- Flowering on the Lamb Range near Cairns

Conservation status
- Least Concern (IUCN 3.1)

Scientific classification
- Kingdom: Plantae
- Clade: Embryophytes
- Clade: Tracheophytes
- Clade: Spermatophytes
- Clade: Angiosperms
- Clade: Eudicots
- Clade: Rosids
- Order: Oxalidales
- Family: Cunoniaceae
- Genus: Ackama
- Species: A. australiensis

Binomial name
- Ackama australiensis (Schltr.) C.T.White

Synonyms
- Betchea australiensis Schltr.; Caldcluvia australiensis (Schltr.) Hoogland; Ackama quadrivalvis C.T.White

= Ackama australiensis =

Species of flowering plant

Ackama australiensis, commonly known as rose alder, is a species of plant in the family Cunoniaceae. It is native to the Wet Tropics bioregion of Queensland, Australia.

== Description ==
Ackama australiensis is a tree up to 24 m (79 ft) tall, with large buttresses and vertical lines of lenticels on the trunk. The leaves are imparipinnate with five leaflets, and they have both stipules and domatia. Small white flowers are produced on paniculate inflorescences and are about 1.5 mm (0.06 in) wide—White described them as being "sweetly scented". The fruit are capsules about 2 mm (0.08 in) diameter, seeds hairy.

== Distribution and habitat ==
It is endemic to eastern Queensland and extends from the MacIlwraith Range in Cape York Peninsula, south to about Eungella National Park, but with the bulk of the population occurring between Cooktown and Townsville. It grows in wetter parts of rainforest (creeks and gullies) at altitudes from about 400–1,150 m (1,310–3,770 ft).

== Taxonomy ==
This species was originally described as Betchea australiensis in 1914, by botanist Rudolf Schlechter – his description was based on material collected in Rockingham Bay by John Dallachy. In 1935 the new combination Ackama australiensis was published by Cyril Tenison White, who argued that Schlechter had no fruiting specimens of the plants and had therefore erred in his taxonomic assessment of the plant.

== Conservation ==
As of May 2026, this species has been assessed to be of least concern by the International Union for Conservation of Nature (IUCN) and by the Queensland Government under its Nature Conservation Act.

== Uses ==
The tree produces a durable hardwood timber which has been used as a cabinet timber.

== Gallery ==
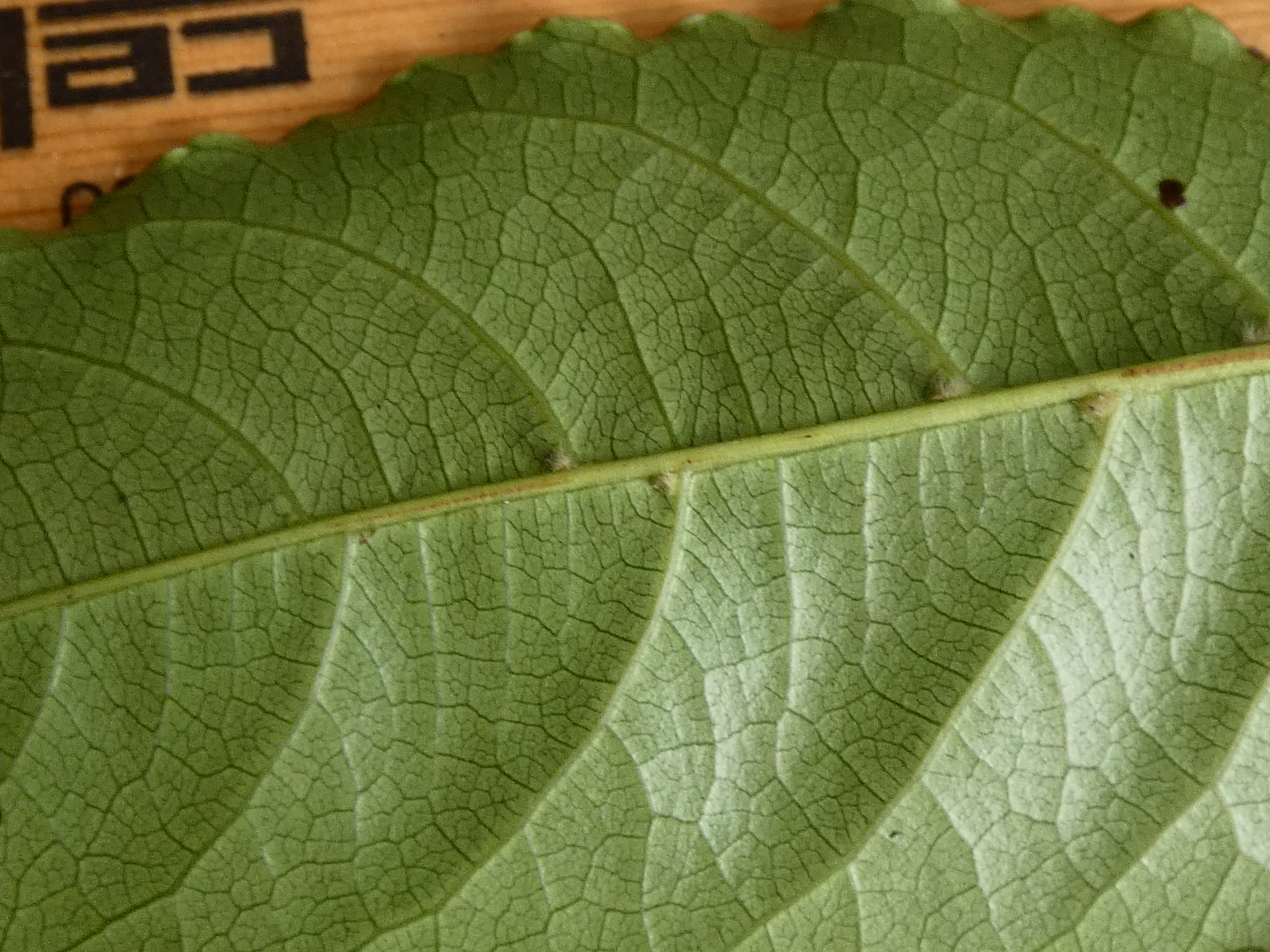
Leaf detail showing domatia

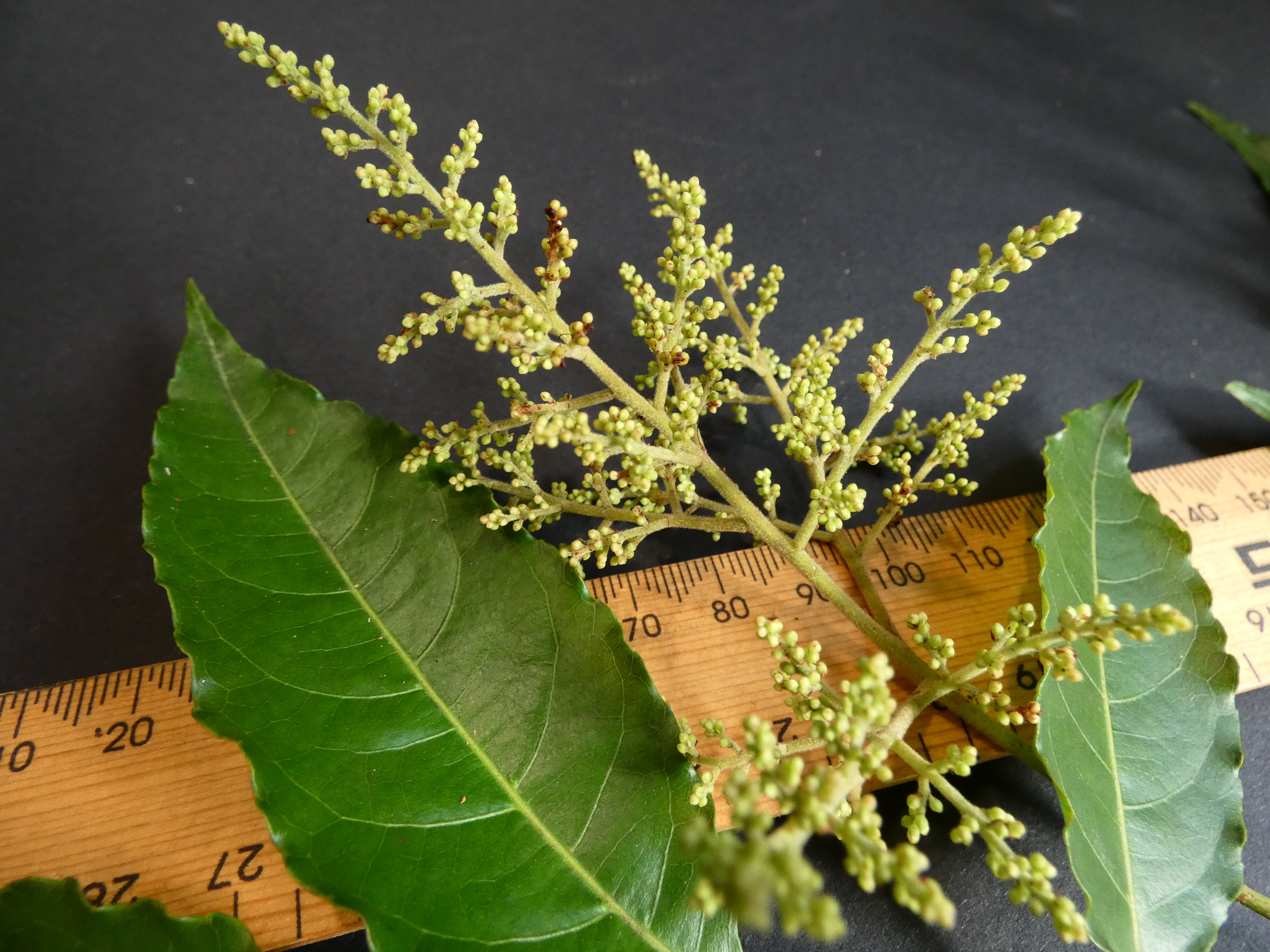
Inflorescence detail, at bud stage

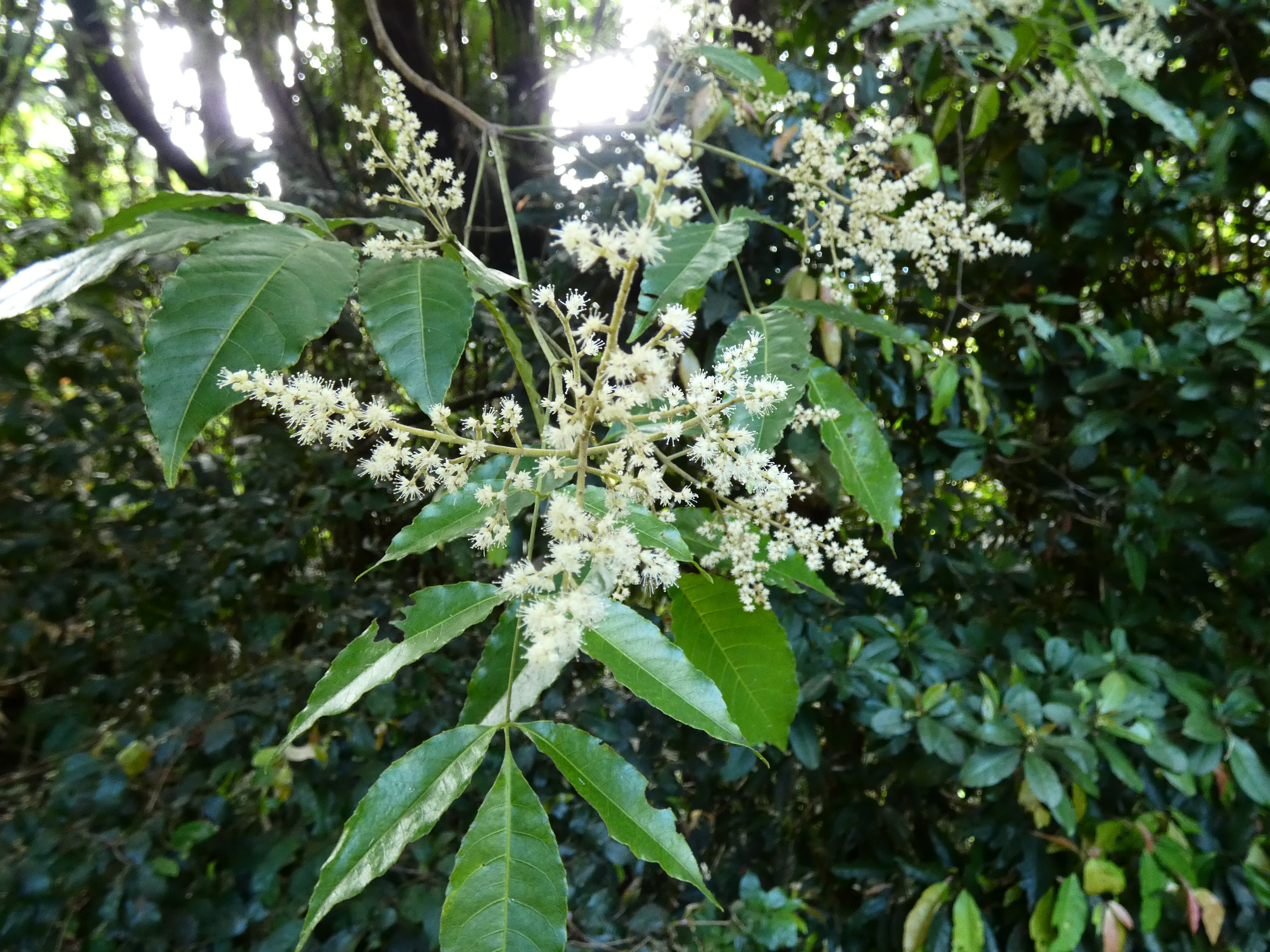
Open flowers

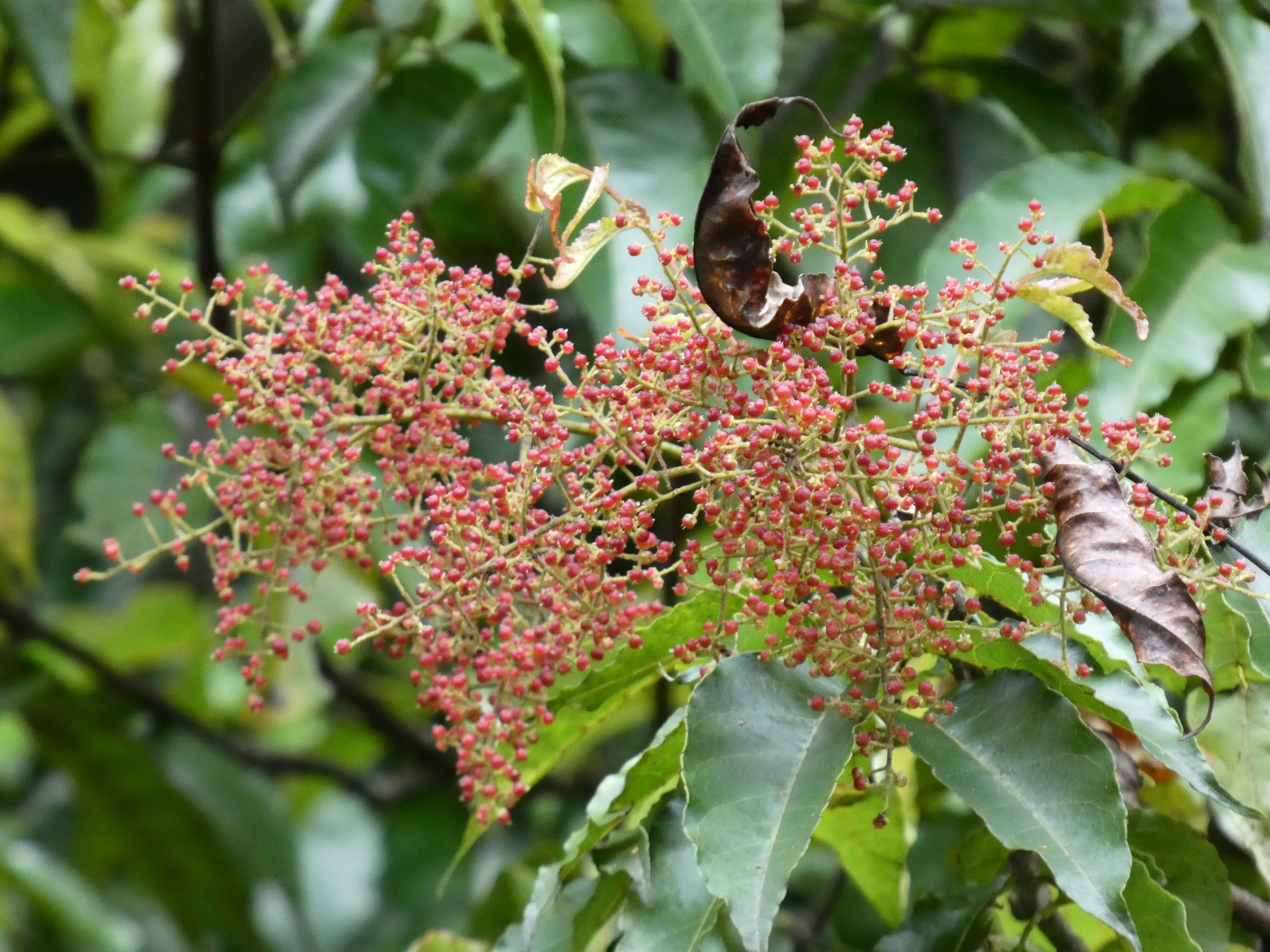
Ripe fruit
