= Willi Willi National Park =

National park in Australia

- IUCN category Ib (wilderness area)
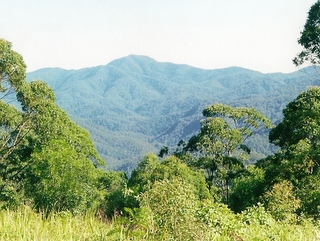
- Mount Banda Banda seen from Number 1 fire tower.

- Location within New South Wales
- Location: New South Wales
- Nearest city: Wauchope
- Coordinates: 31°10′43″S 152°29′27″E
- Area: 298.7 km^{2} (115.3 sq mi)
- Established: 4 April 1996
- Governing body: NSW National Parks & Wildlife Service
- Website: Official website

The Willi Willi National Park is a protected national park located on the North Coast region of New South Wales, Australia. Gazetted in 1996, the 29,870-hectare (73,800-acre) park is situated 325 kilometres (202 mi) northeast of Sydney and 60 kilometres (37 mi) west of Wauchope.

The park is part of the Hastings-Macleay group World Heritage Site Gondwana Rainforests of Australia inscribed in 1986 and added to the Australian National Heritage List in 2007.

The park is quite noticeable from nearby Port Macquarie as a tall escarpment to the north west. The park is between the Macleay River and Hastings River valleys and includes Kemps Pinnacle and Mount Banda Banda, both over 1,100 metres (3,600 ft) above sea level.

This is one of the most beautiful parks in New South Wales. Its diversity offers naturalists everything they need, there are protected species of plants, birds and animals, as well as a beautiful rainforest environment.

== See also ==
- Protected areas of New South Wales
