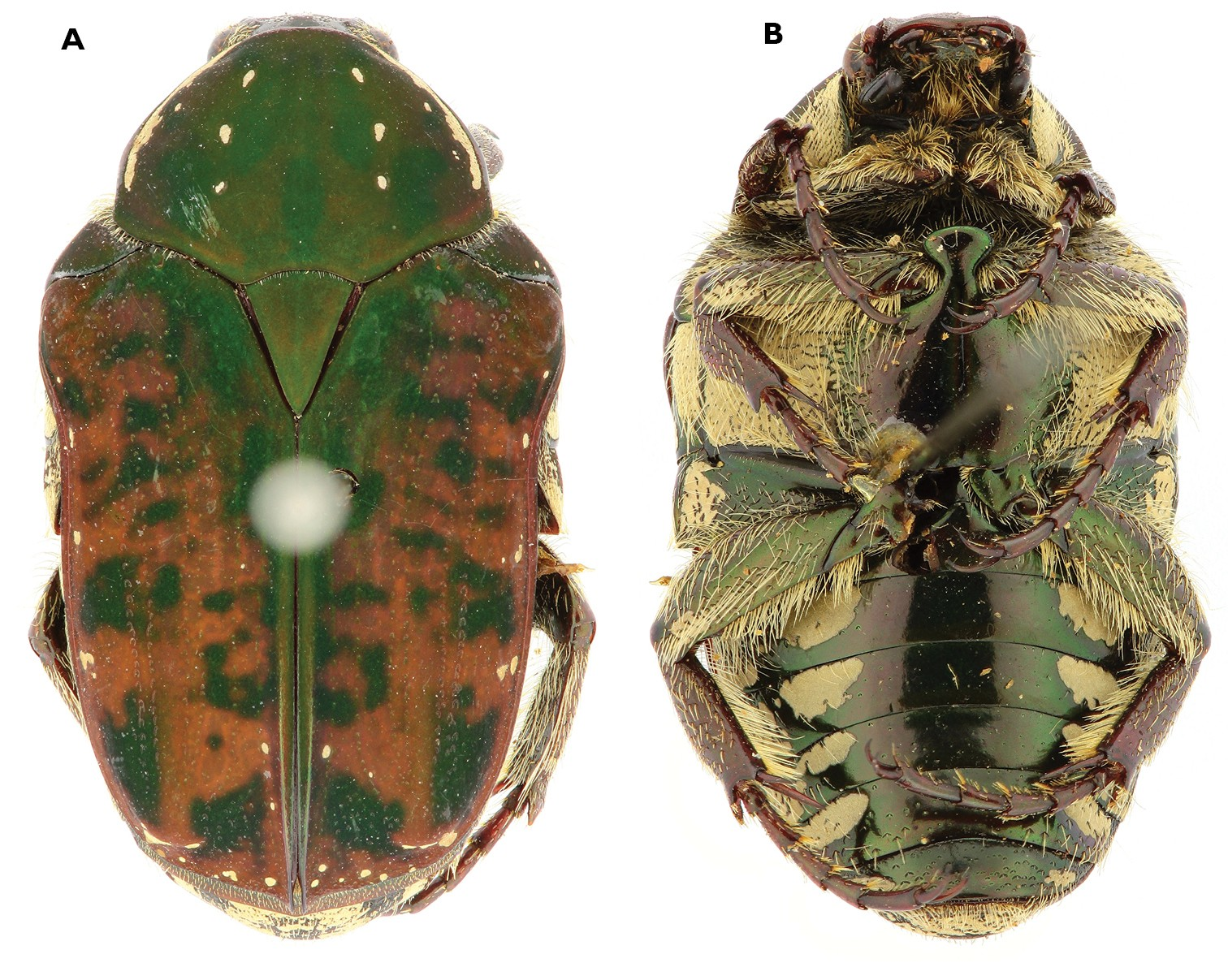

Scientific classification
- Kingdom: Animalia
- Phylum: Arthropoda
- Clade: Pancrustacea
- Class: Insecta
- Order: Coleoptera
- Suborder: Polyphaga
- Infraorder: Scarabaeiformia
- Family: Scarabaeidae
- Genus: Atrichelaphinis
- Species: A. sternalis

Binomial name
- Atrichelaphinis sternalis (Moser, 1914)

Synonyms
- Anelaphinis sternalis Moser, 1914

= Atrichelaphinis sternalis =

Species of beetle

Atrichelaphinis sternalis is a species of beetle of the family Scarabaeidae. It is found in Ethiopia.

== Description ==
Adults reach a length of about 12.1–13.7 mm (0.48–0.54 in) for males and 12.9–13.5 mm (0.51–0.53 in) for females. The gound colour ranges from brown orange to brown red, with green marks more or less developed, at times covering the whole dorsal surface with the exception of a few areas of ground colour. They are velutinous, with metallic reflections as in Atrichelaphinis simillima. The tomentum and pilosity are well developed and with almost the same distribution as in simillima.
