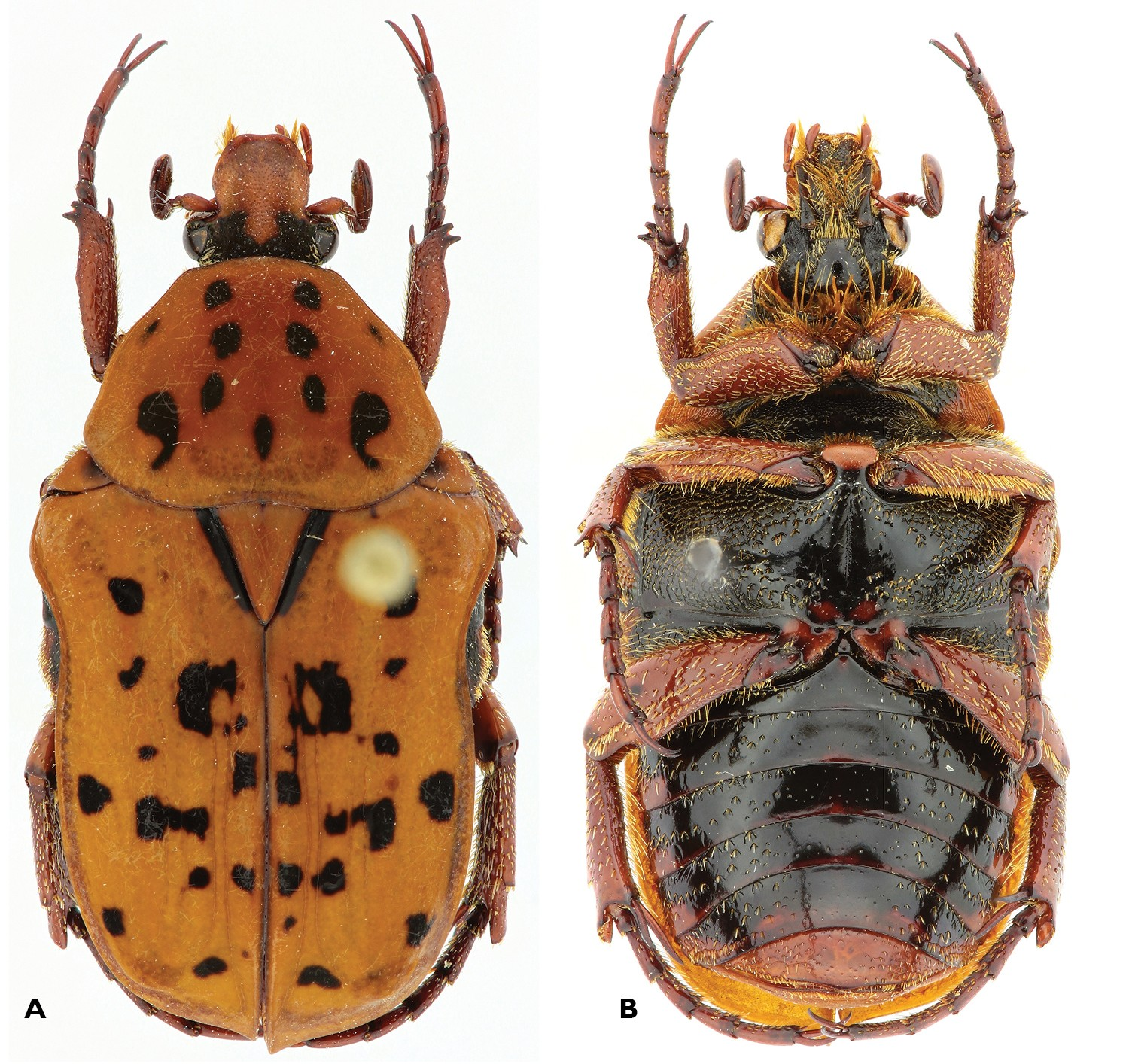

Scientific classification
- Kingdom: Animalia
- Phylum: Arthropoda
- Clade: Pancrustacea
- Class: Insecta
- Order: Coleoptera
- Suborder: Polyphaga
- Infraorder: Scarabaeiformia
- Family: Scarabaeidae
- Genus: Atrichelaphinis
- Species: A. nigropunctulata

Binomial name
- Atrichelaphinis nigropunctulata (Péringuey, 1896)

Synonyms
- Cetonia nigropunctulata Péringuey, 1896

= Atrichelaphinis nigropunctulata =

Species of beetle

Atrichelaphinis nigropunctulata is a species of beetle of the family Scarabaeidae. It is found in Angola, South Africa (Mpumalanga, KwaZulu-Natal, Western Cape) and Zimbabwe.

== Description ==
Adults reach a length of about 12.8–15.2 mm (0.50–0.60 in) for males and 13.1–14.8 mm (0.52–0.58 in) for females. They are orange with black markings on the pronotum, scutellum and elytra, sometimes very reduced. Occasionally, there are some isolated small spots of white tomentum on the pronotum, pygidium and venter. The pilosity is occasional and restricted to the head.

== Life history ==
The species is most frequently found feeding on flowers of Protea species.
