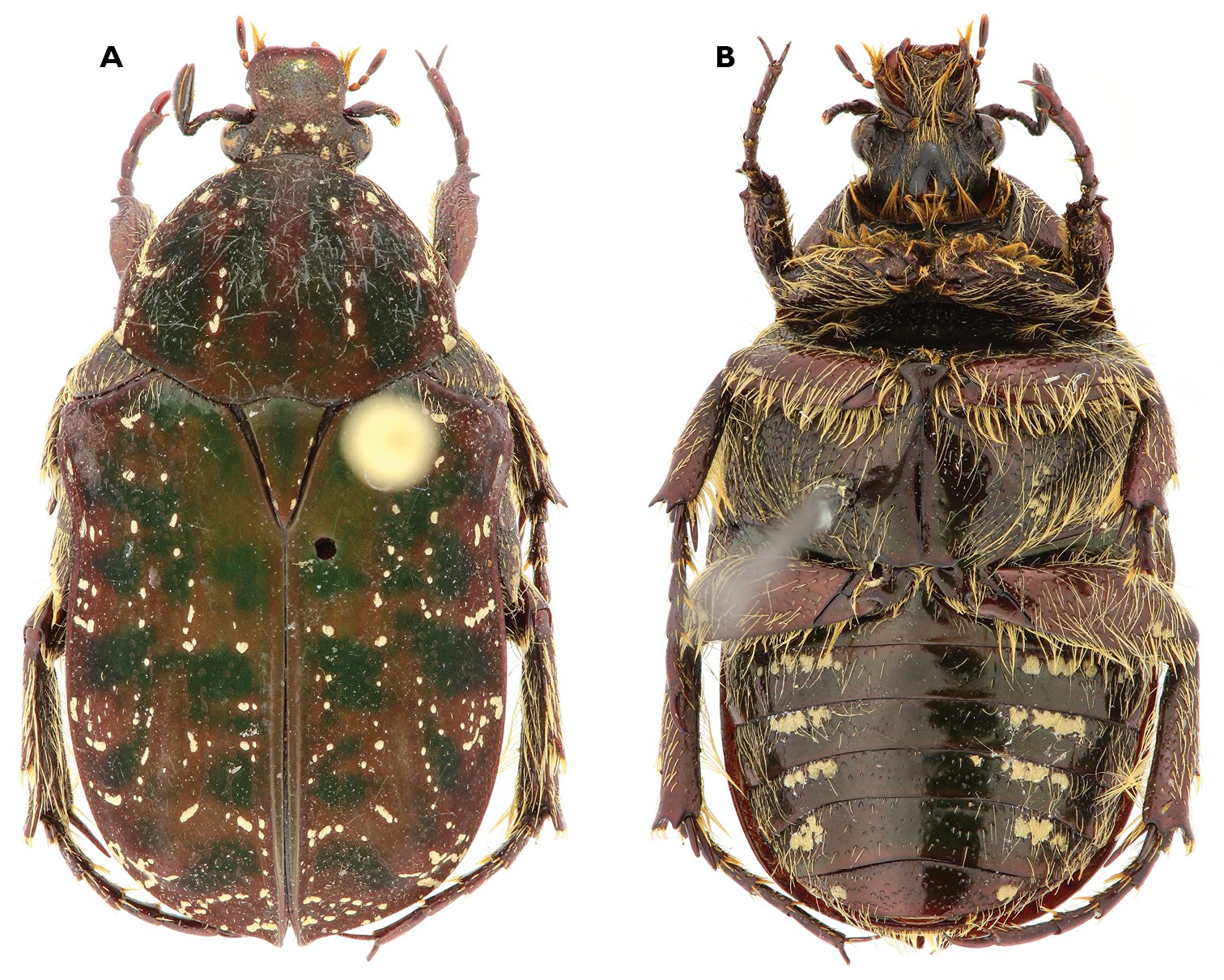

Scientific classification
- Kingdom: Animalia
- Phylum: Arthropoda
- Clade: Pancrustacea
- Class: Insecta
- Order: Coleoptera
- Suborder: Polyphaga
- Infraorder: Scarabaeiformia
- Family: Scarabaeidae
- Genus: Atrichelaphinis
- Species: A. bjornstadi

Binomial name
- Atrichelaphinis bjornstadi Rojkoff & Perissinotto, 2015

= Atrichelaphinis bjornstadi =

Species of beetle

Atrichelaphinis bjornstadi is a species of beetle of the family Scarabaeidae. It is found in Tanzania.

== Description ==
Adults reach a length of about 13.6–14.6 mm (0.54–0.57 in) for males and 12–15 mm (0.47–0.59 in) for females. They are velutinous and brown with green to dark green marks, and with small white spots scattered throughout, sometimes becoming confluent on the lateral declivity of the elytra, pronotum and pygidium. Light pilosity is distributed on the vertex, lateral margins of the pronotum, apical part of the elytra and pygidium.

== Etymology ==
This species is named after the Norwegian entomologist Anders Bjørnstad.
