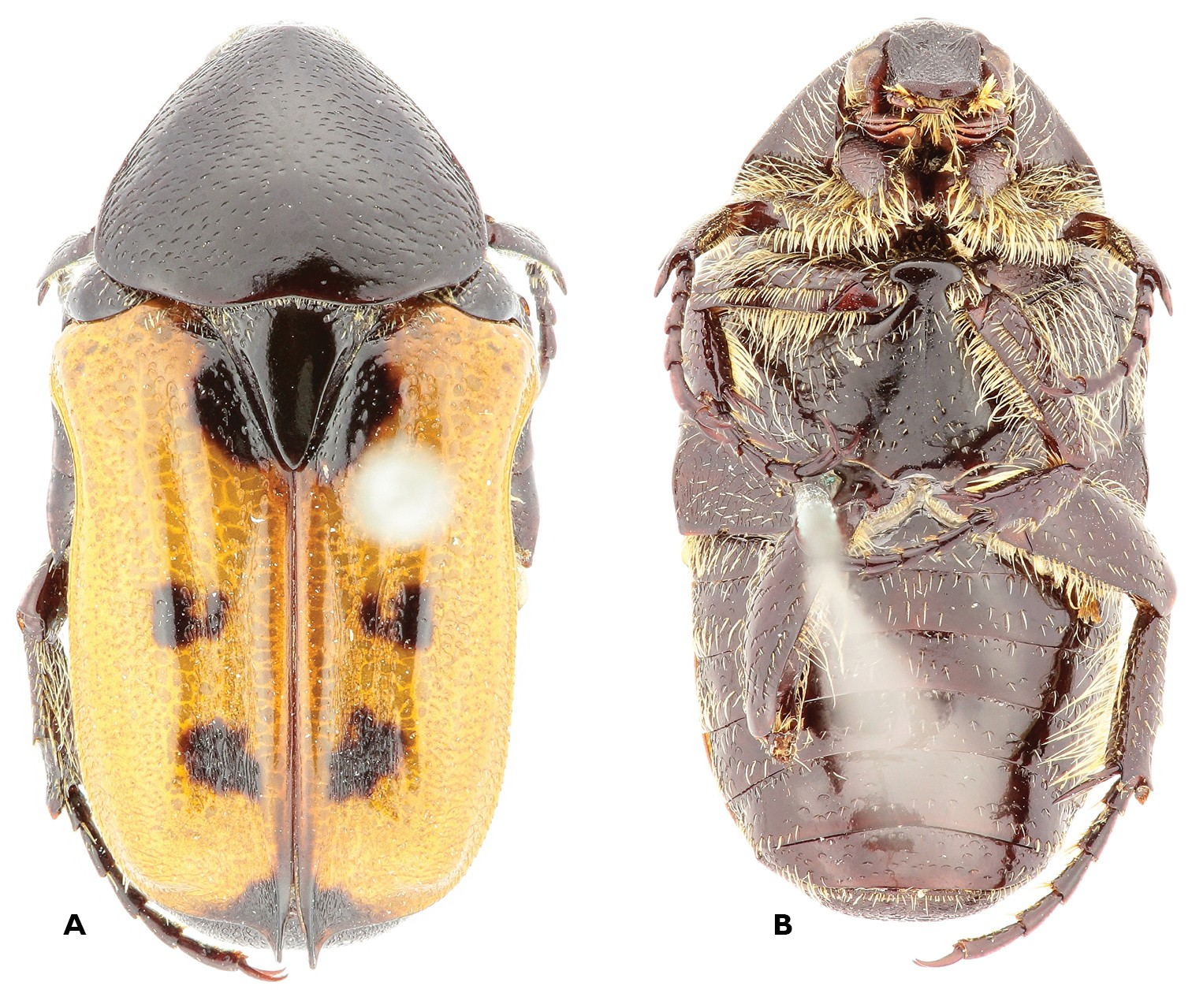

Scientific classification
- Kingdom: Animalia
- Phylum: Arthropoda
- Clade: Pancrustacea
- Class: Insecta
- Order: Coleoptera
- Suborder: Polyphaga
- Infraorder: Scarabaeiformia
- Family: Scarabaeidae
- Genus: Atrichelaphinis
- Species: A. quadripunctata

Binomial name
- Atrichelaphinis quadripunctata (Lansberge, 1882)

Synonyms
- Elaphinis quadripunctatus Lansberge, 1882

= Atrichelaphinis quadripunctata =

Species of beetle

Atrichelaphinis quadripunctata is a species of beetle of the family Scarabaeidae. It is found in Somalia.

== Description ==
Adults reach a length of about 11 mm (0.43 in). The head is dark brown with blackish areas and strongly sculpted. The pronotum is dark brown with transverse points of sculpture, disc poorly punctate, sculpture becoming more dense and confluent to striae in front and laterally. The scutellum is dark brown and smooth, with only a few setigerous points on the lateral angles. The elytra are orange with four black markings. The pygidium is chestnut brown.
