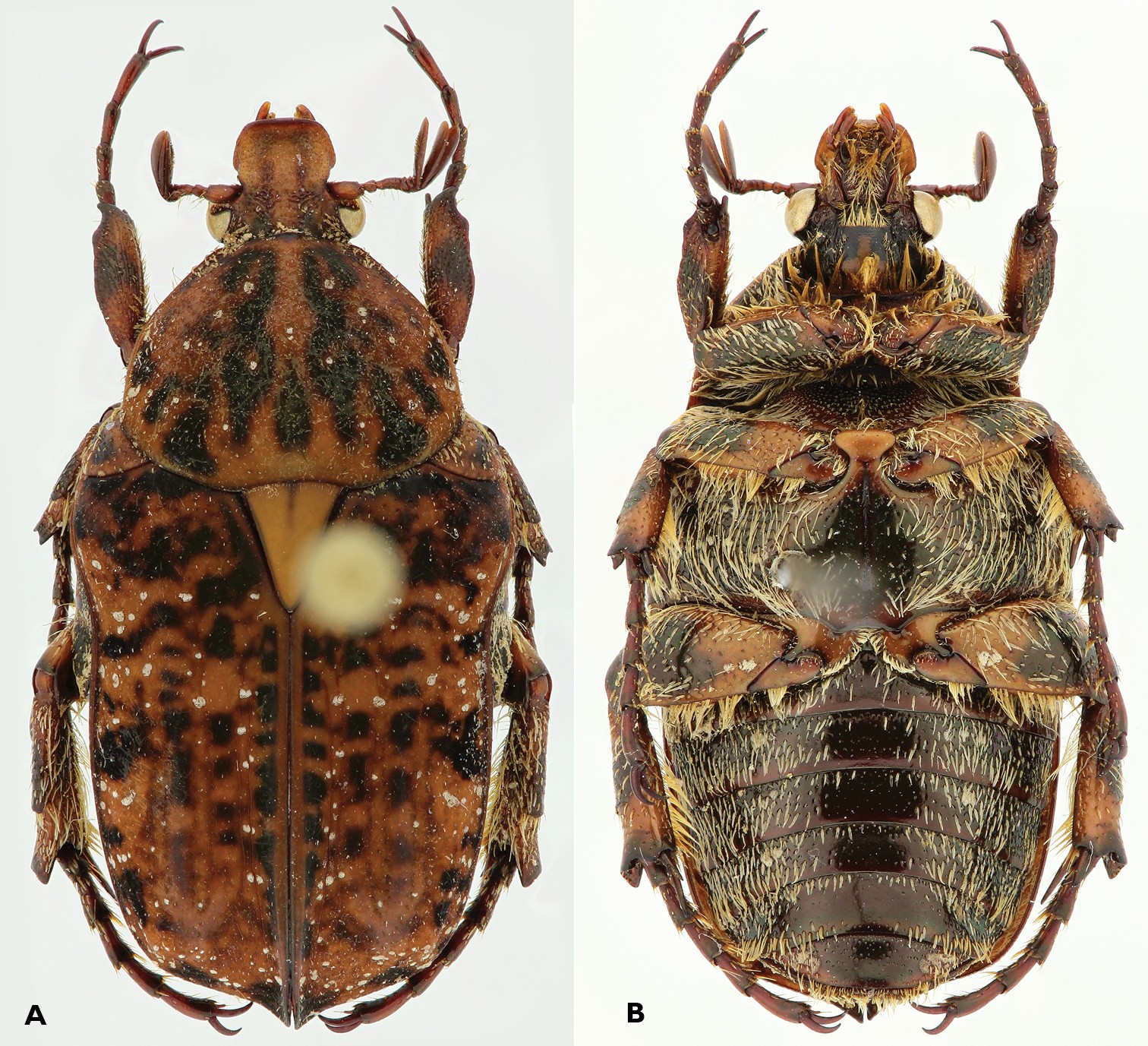

Scientific classification
- Kingdom: Animalia
- Phylum: Arthropoda
- Clade: Pancrustacea
- Class: Insecta
- Order: Coleoptera
- Suborder: Polyphaga
- Infraorder: Scarabaeiformia
- Family: Scarabaeidae
- Genus: Atrichelaphinis
- Species: A. garnieri

Binomial name
- Atrichelaphinis garnieri Rojkoff & Perissinotto, 2015

= Atrichelaphinis garnieri =

Species of beetle

Atrichelaphinis garnieri is a species of beetle of the family Scarabaeidae. It is found in Tanzania and Zimbabwe.

== Description ==
Adults reach a length of about 10.7–13.6 mm (0.42–0.54 in) for males and 10.7–12.9 mm (0.42–0.51 in) for females. They are light brown with dark marks ranging from green to brown. The dark colour at times covers virtually the entire surface. They are dull to shiny, with white spots of tomentum scattered throughout. There is light pilisoty distributed on the vertex, along lateral margins of the pronotum, on the elytra (mainly along the lateral margins and at the apex) and pygidium.

== Etymology ==
The species is dedicated to the French collector Thierry Garnier.
