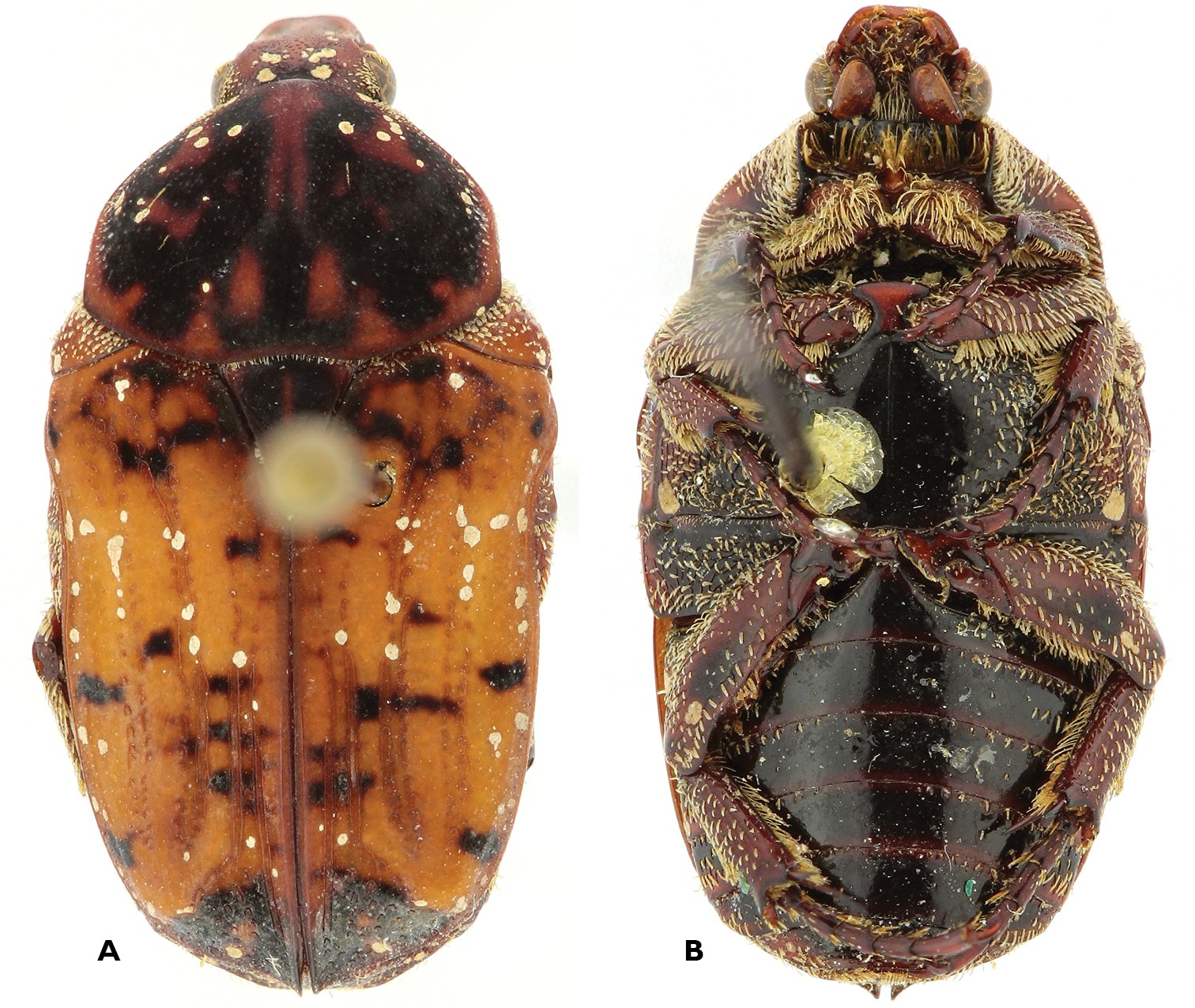
- Atrichelaphinis deplanata deplanata
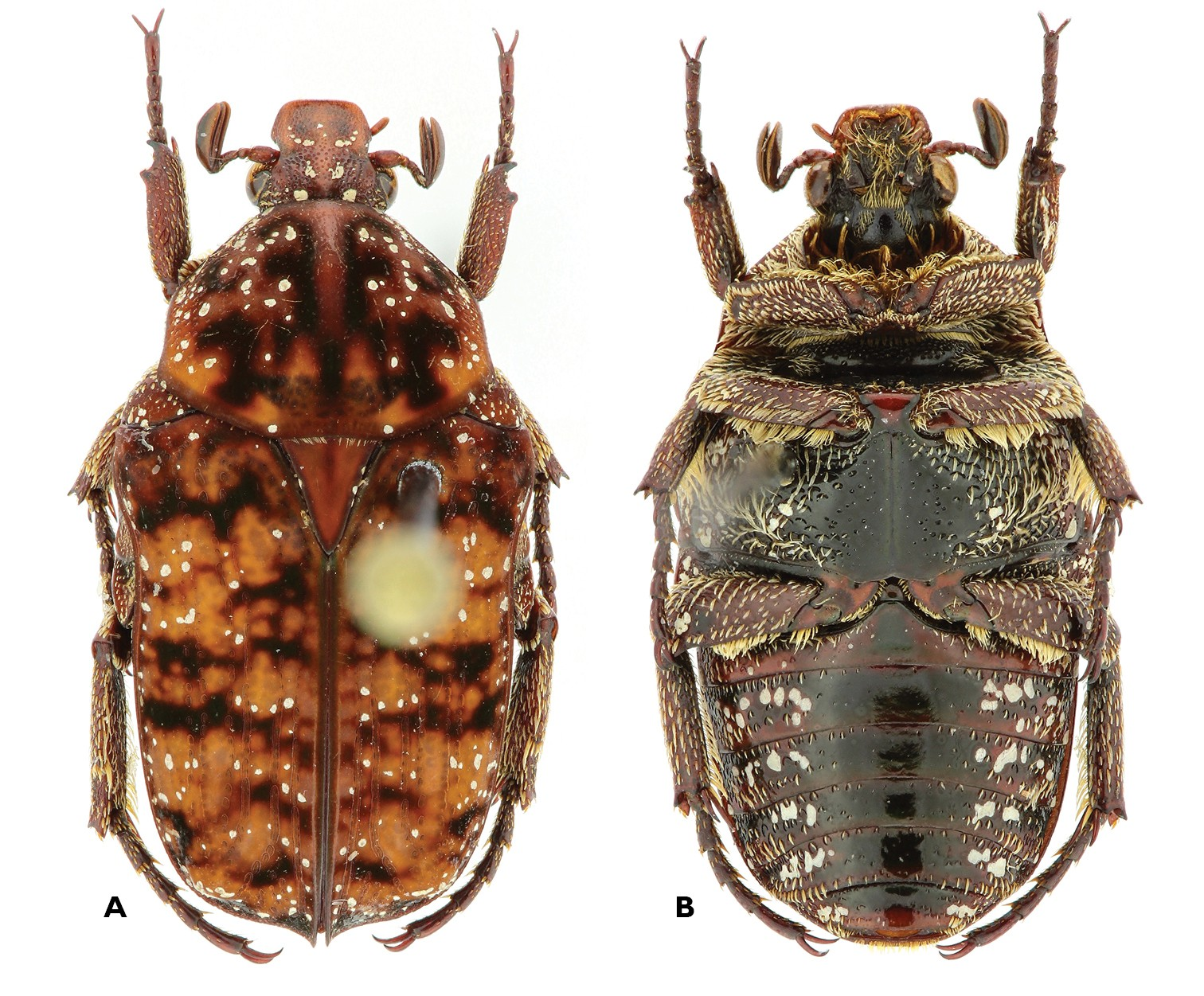
- Atrichelaphinis deplanata minettii

Scientific classification
- Kingdom: Animalia
- Phylum: Arthropoda
- Clade: Pancrustacea
- Class: Insecta
- Order: Coleoptera
- Suborder: Polyphaga
- Infraorder: Scarabaeiformia
- Family: Scarabaeidae
- Genus: Atrichelaphinis
- Species: A. deplanata

Binomial name
- Atrichelaphinis deplanata Moser, 1907

Synonyms
- Anelaphinis kwangensis Burgeon, 1932

= Atrichelaphinis deplanata =

Species of beetle

Atrichelaphinis deplanata is a species of beetle of the family Scarabaeidae. It is found in Benin, Ghana, Ivory Coast, the Democratic Republic of the Congo, Rwanda, Zambia, Zimbabwe, Angola, Malawi, Mozambique, the Republic of the Congo and South Africa (North West, Gauteng).

== Description ==
Adults reach a length of about 9.1–13.3 mm (0.36–0.52 in) for males and 9.8–12.4 mm (0.39–0.49 in) for females. They are velutinous dorsally, with the background colour ranging from light-yellow to light-brown, and with many black/dark brown markings and small white maculae. The scale pilosity is mainly found on the ventral surface, and is more extensive in males than in females, and is particularly dense on the antero-lateral borders of the pronotum and legs. Subspecies minettii is smaller size and the black/brown markings are more regularly disposed and reduced. Also, the background colour is more reddish.

== Life history ==
The species seems to be a flower visitor.

== Subspecies ==
- Atrichelaphinis deplanata deplanata (Benin, Ghana, Ivory Coast, Democratic Republic of the Congo)
- Atrichelaphinis deplanata minettii Rojkoff & Perissinotto, 2015 (Rwanda, Zambia, Zimbabwe, Angola, Malawi, Mozambique, Democratic Republic of the Congo, Republic of the Congo, South Africa: North West, Gauteng)
