= Atrichelaphinis sexualis =

Scientific classification
- Kingdom: Animalia
- Phylum: Arthropoda
- Clade: Pancrustacea
- Class: Insecta
- Order: Coleoptera
- Suborder: Polyphaga
- Infraorder: Scarabaeiformia
- Family: Scarabaeidae
- Genus: Atrichelaphinis
- Species: A. sexualis

Binomial name
- Atrichelaphinis sexualis (Schein, 1956)

Synonyms
- Leptothyrea sexualis Schein, 1956

Species of beetle

Atrichelaphinis sexualis is a species of beetle of the family Scarabaeidae. It is found in Somalia.

== Description ==
Adults reach a length of about 10–11 mm (0.39–0.43 in). The antennae are orange/red and the pronotum is black or red, with a white stripe along the lateral margin and two deep and round white maculae at the base in males, red and without white maculae in females. The elytra are black, with white macula at the umbone (reaching the suture); 4–6 irregular stripes of broken white maculae and two white longitudinal stripes on the disc, parallel to the suture, made of irregular and interrupted spots in males. Females are without white maculae or only reduced marks in place of the male stripes. The pygidium is orange/red.
