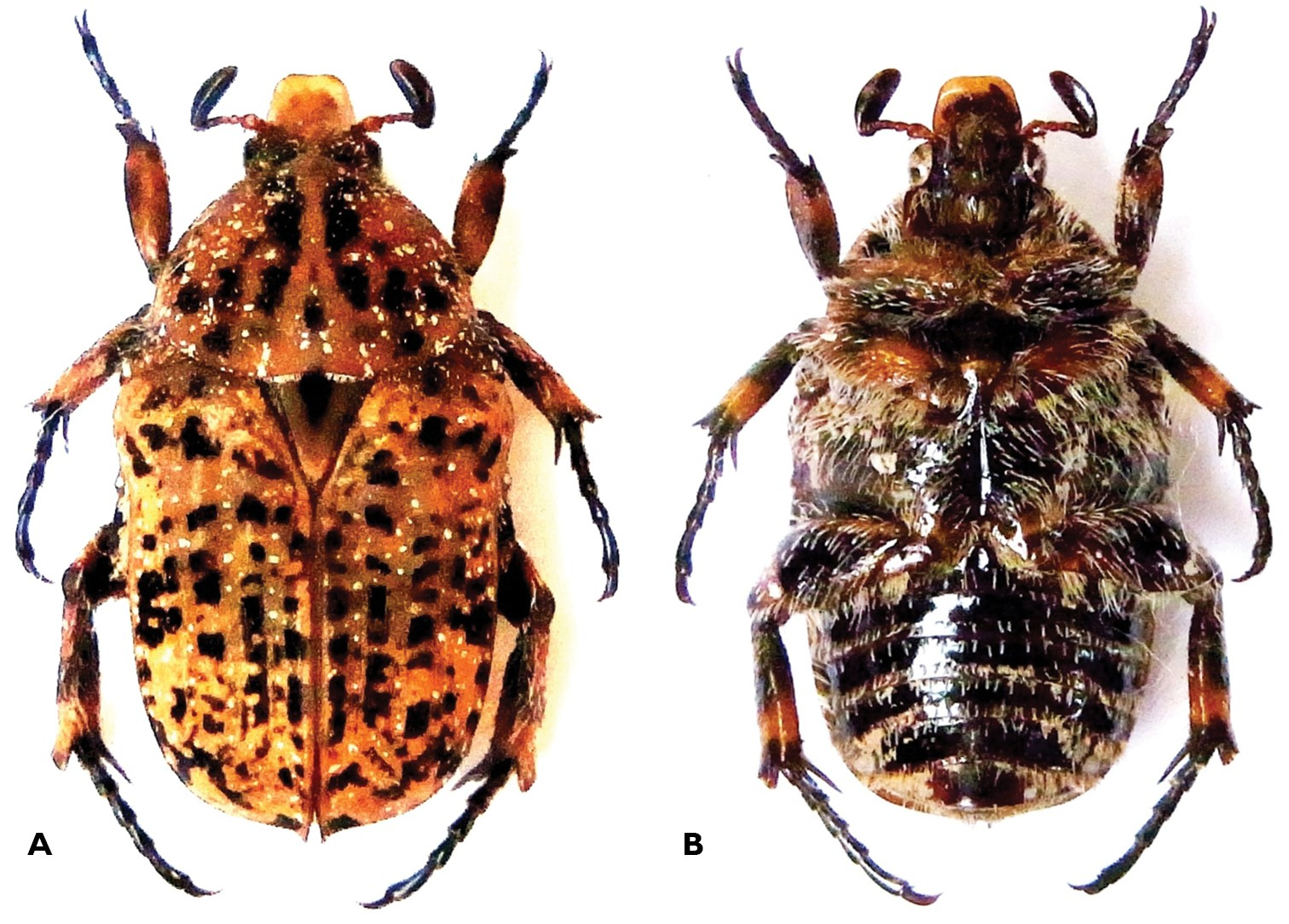

Scientific classification
- Kingdom: Animalia
- Phylum: Arthropoda
- Clade: Pancrustacea
- Class: Insecta
- Order: Coleoptera
- Suborder: Polyphaga
- Infraorder: Scarabaeiformia
- Family: Scarabaeidae
- Genus: Atrichelaphinis
- Species: A. bomboesbergica

Binomial name
- Atrichelaphinis bomboesbergica Rojkoff & Perissinotto, 2015

= Atrichelaphinis bomboesbergica =

Species of beetle

Atrichelaphinis bomboesbergica is a species of beetle of the family Scarabaeidae. It is found in South Africa (Eastern Cape), where it seems to be restricted to a small area of the eastern Karoo semiarid region.

== Description ==
Adults reach a length of about 9.4–11.7 mm (0.37–0.46 in) for males and 10.1–12.8 mm (0.40–0.50 in) for females. The dorsal surface is slightly shiny, with the ground colour ranging from ochraceous to light-brown, and with many black/dark brown markings and small white maculae. There are scale-like setae which are particularly well developed on the pronotum and are more extensive in males than in females.

== Life history ==
The larval stages develop exclusively in the dung middens of the antbear (Orycteropus afer). Adults have a relatively short life span (2–3 weeks) and appear to be unable to feed, as none has yet been observed either on fruits, flowers or sap flows.

== Etymology ==
The species is named after the Bamboesberg mountain range of the Eastern Cape Province of South Africa, where it was discovered on its south-western slopes.
