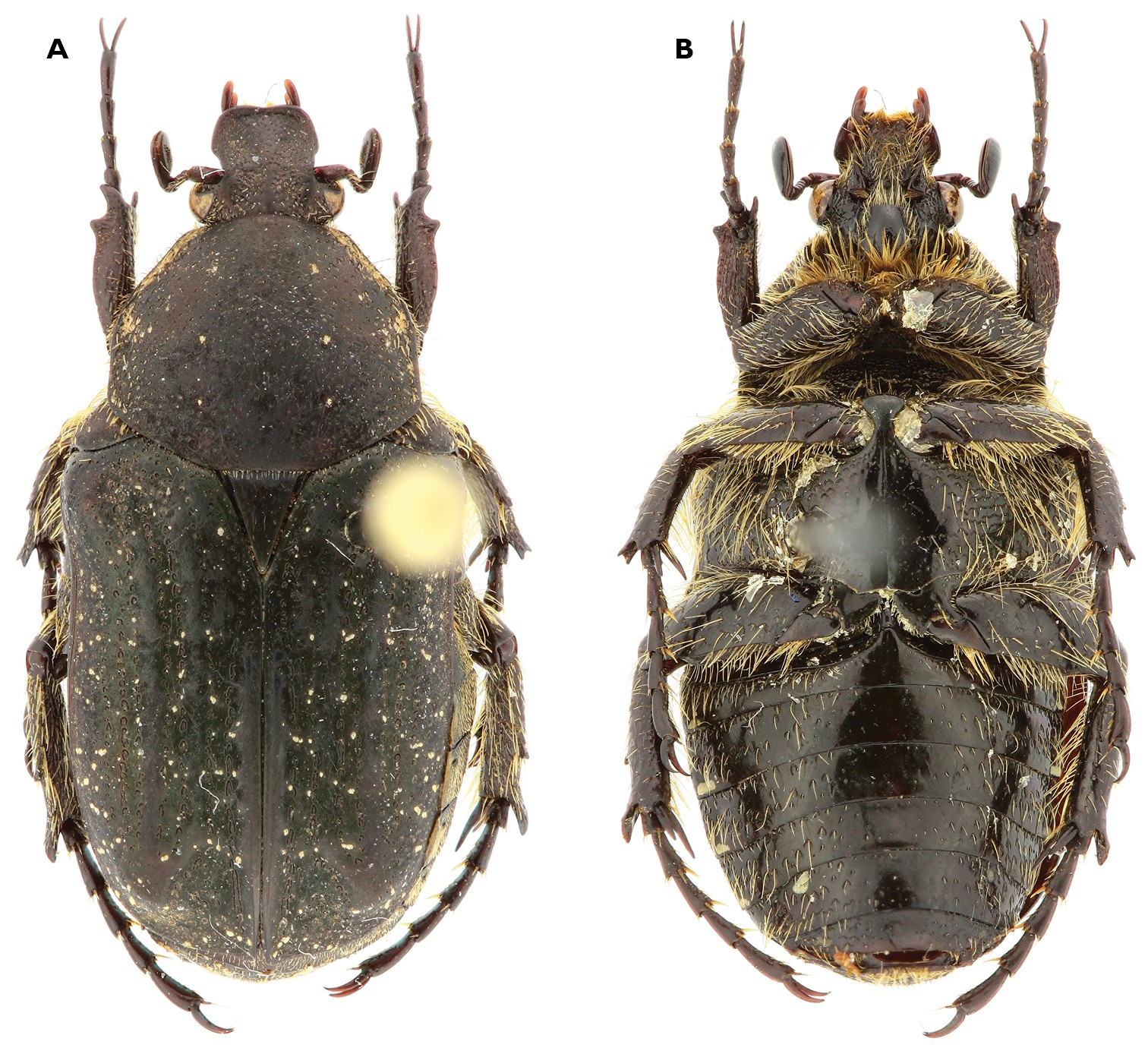

Scientific classification
- Kingdom: Animalia
- Phylum: Arthropoda
- Clade: Pancrustacea
- Class: Insecta
- Order: Coleoptera
- Suborder: Polyphaga
- Infraorder: Scarabaeiformia
- Family: Scarabaeidae
- Genus: Atrichelaphinis
- Species: A. vermiculata

Binomial name
- Atrichelaphinis vermiculata (Fairmaire, 1894)

Synonyms
- Elaphinis vermiculata Fairmaire, 1894

= Atrichelaphinis vermiculata =

Species of beetle

Atrichelaphinis vermiculata is a species of beetle of the family Scarabaeidae. It is found in Ethiopia and Eritrea.

== Description ==
Adults reach a length of about 12.1–13 mm (0.48–0.51 in) for males and 10.7–13.9 mm (0.42–0.55 in) for females. They are velutinous, with the colour ranging from light brown with dark marks to dark green with dark brown areas. There are white small irregular spots scattered throughout, sometimes becoming confluent on the lateral declivity of the elytra, pronotum and pygidium. Light pilosity is usually present on the vertex and lateral margins of the pronotum, elytral apex and pygidium.
