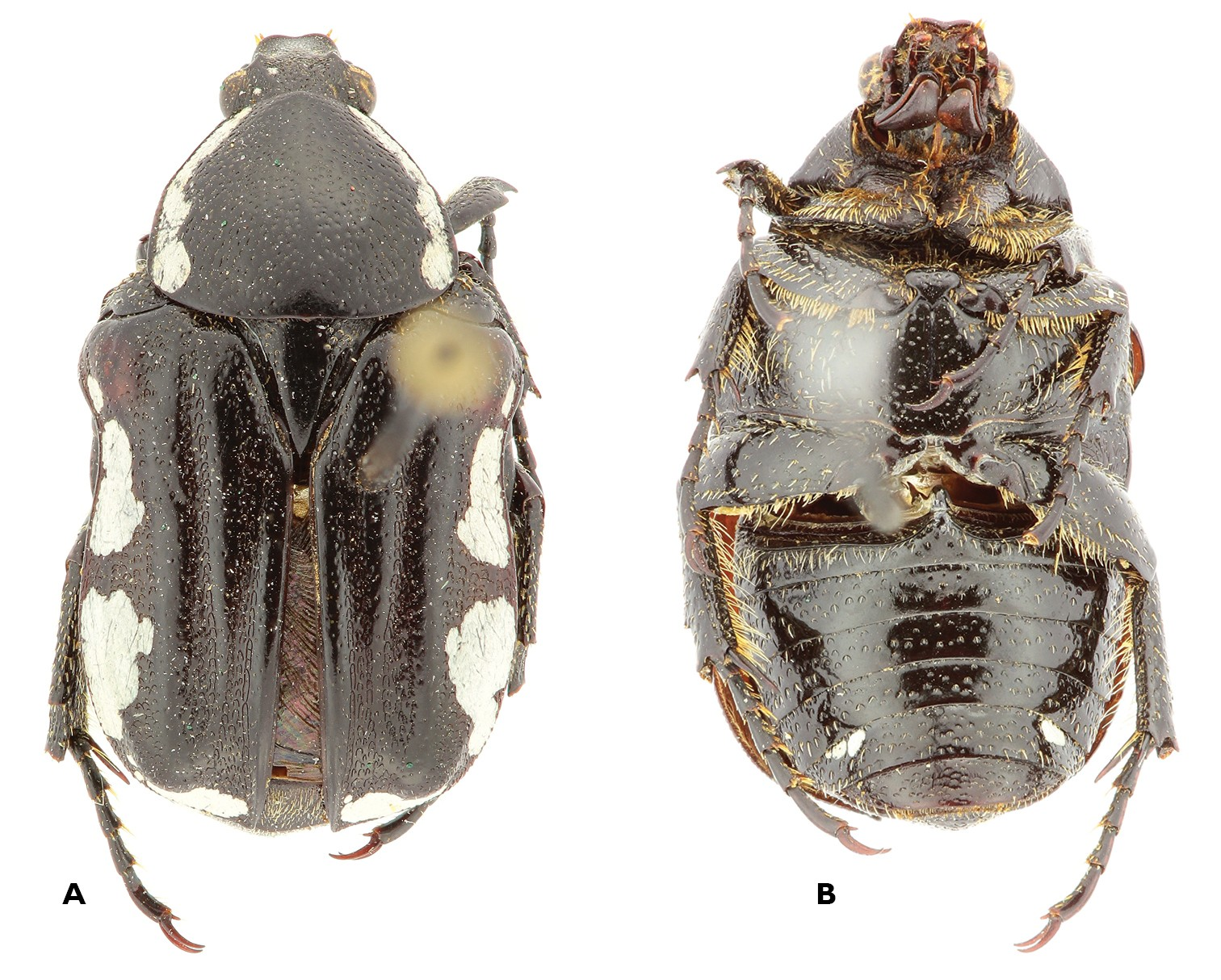

Scientific classification
- Kingdom: Animalia
- Phylum: Arthropoda
- Clade: Pancrustacea
- Class: Insecta
- Order: Coleoptera
- Suborder: Polyphaga
- Infraorder: Scarabaeiformia
- Family: Scarabaeidae
- Genus: Atrichelaphinis
- Species: A. nigra

Binomial name
- Atrichelaphinis nigra Antoine, 2002

= Atrichelaphinis nigra =

Species of beetle

Atrichelaphinis nigra is a species of beetle of the family Scarabaeidae. It is found in Somalia.

== Description ==
Adults reach a length of about 8.8–10.3 mm (0.35–0.41 in). They have a stocky appearance, and are black to dark-brown, raning from dull to slightly shiny, with white tomentose spots. There is a lateral and irregular band on the pronotal margin in males, which is narrower in females, and occasionally reduced to a line on the lateral angle. There are three main spots on the lateral margins of the elytra in males, and these are reduced and fragmented in females.
