= Atrichelaphinis =

Scientific classification
- Kingdom: Animalia
- Phylum: Arthropoda
- Clade: Pancrustacea
- Class: Insecta
- Order: Coleoptera
- Suborder: Polyphaga
- Infraorder: Scarabaeiformia
- Family: Scarabaeidae
- Subfamily: Cetoniinae
- Tribe: Cetoniini
- Genus: Atrichelaphinis; Kraatz, 1898

Genus of leaf beetles

Atrichelaphinis is a genus of beetles belonging to the family Scarabaeidae.

== Species ==
- subgenus Atrichelaphinis
  - Atrichelaphinis nigropunctulata (Péringuey, 1896)
  - Atrichelaphinis tigrina (Olivier, 1789)
- subgenus Eugeaphinis Rojkoff & Perissinotto, 2015
  - Atrichelaphinis bjornstadi Rojkoff & Perissinotto, 2015
  - Atrichelaphinis bomboesbergica Rojkoff & Perissinotto, 2015
  - Atrichelaphinis deplanata Moser, 1907
  - Atrichelaphinis garnieri Rojkoff & Perissinotto, 2015
  - Atrichelaphinis rhodesiana (Péringuey, 1907)
  - Atrichelaphinis simillima (Ancey, 1883)
  - Atrichelaphinis sternalis (Moser, 1914)
  - Atrichelaphinis vermiculata (Fairmaire, 1894)
- subgenus Heterelaphinis Antoine, 2002
  - Atrichelaphinis nigra Antoine, 2002
  - Atrichelaphinis quadripunctata (Lansberge, 1882)
  - Atrichelaphinis sexualis (Schein, 1956)
