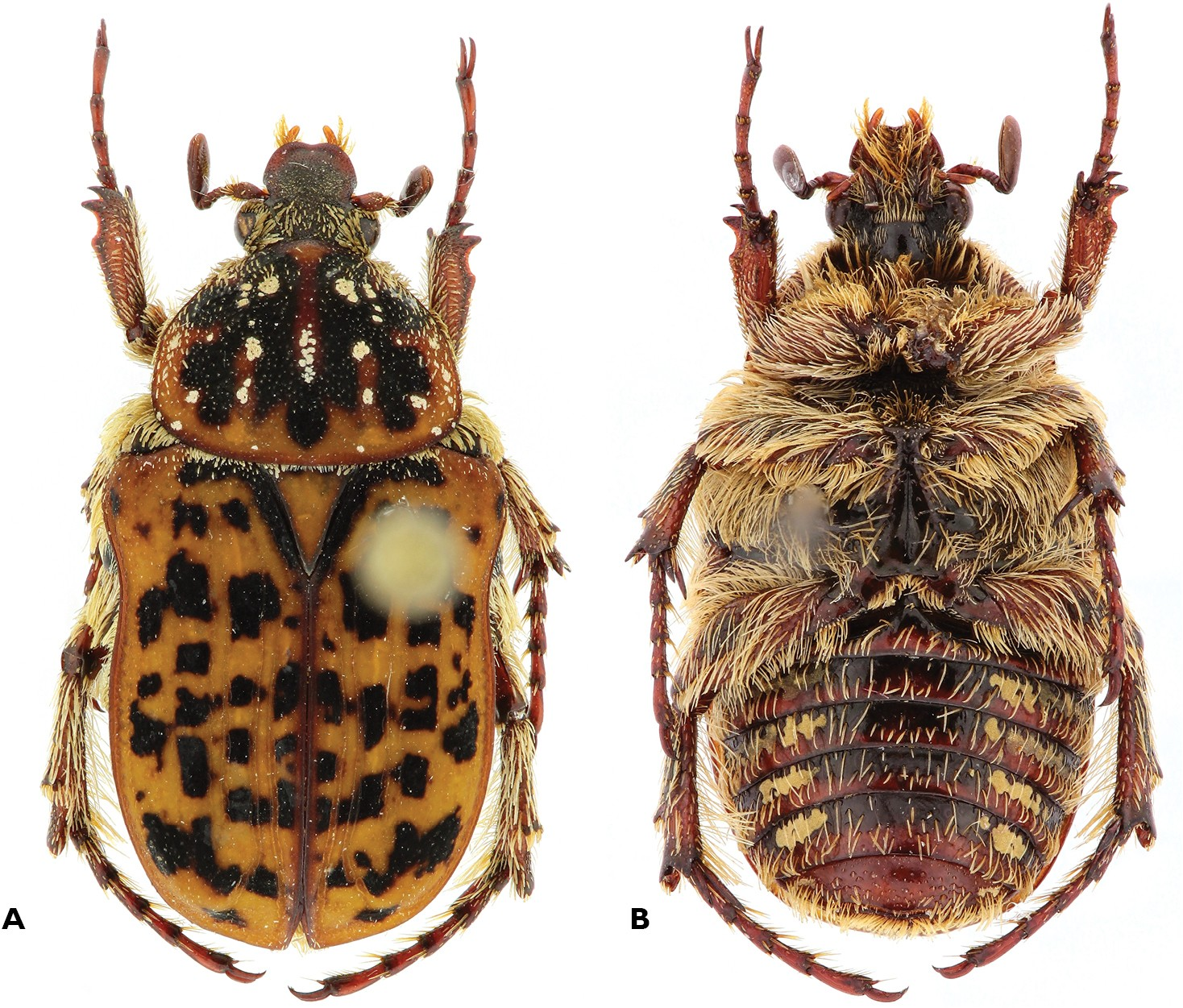

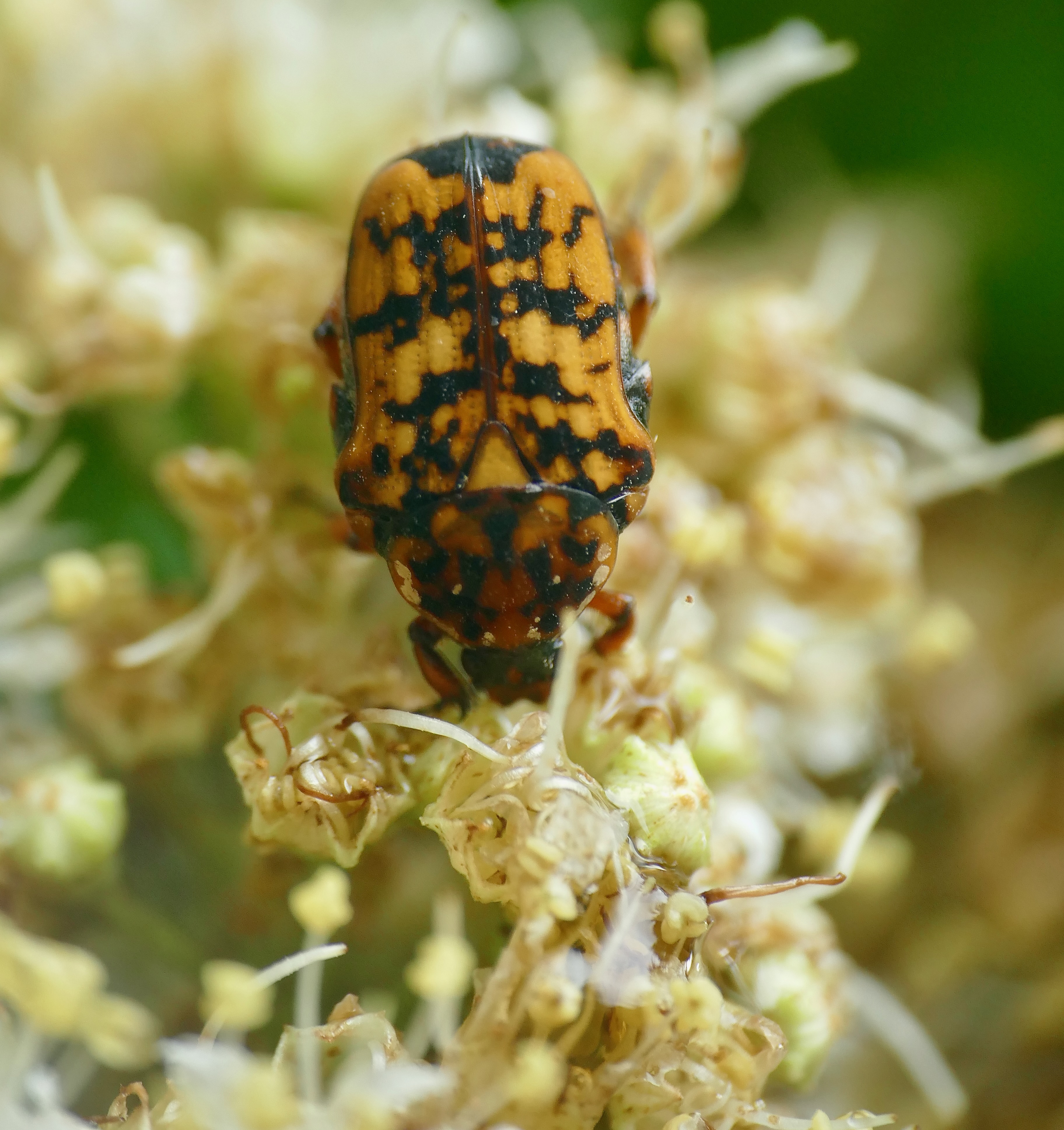

Scientific classification
- Kingdom: Animalia
- Phylum: Arthropoda
- Clade: Pancrustacea
- Class: Insecta
- Order: Coleoptera
- Suborder: Polyphaga
- Infraorder: Scarabaeiformia
- Family: Scarabaeidae
- Genus: Atrichelaphinis
- Species: A. tigrina

Binomial name
- Atrichelaphinis tigrina (Olivier, 1789)

Synonyms
- Cetonia tigrina Olivier, 1789; Cetonia furvata Fabricius, 1798

= Atrichelaphinis tigrina =

Species of beetle

Atrichelaphinis tigrina, the tiger fruit chafer or tiger flower chafer, is a species of beetle of the family Scarabaeidae. It is found in Angola, South Africa (Western Cape, Eastern Cape, KwaZulu-Natal, Gauteng) and Zimbabwe.

== Description ==
Adults reach a length of about 8.6–15.2 mm (0.34–0.60 in) for males and 9.6–15 mm (0.38–0.59 in) for females. The dorsum is orange-brown, dull with black marks well defined and more or less developed, especially on the head and pronotum. There are often white tomentose spots on the pronotum, scutellum and exceptionally on the elytra. The setae are short on the vertex, pronotum (mainly on the lateral side) and the elytral base and extremely short and barely visible on clypeus, elytra and pronotal disc.

== Life history ==
This is a typical flower and fruit feeder that has been observed on a large variety of plants, from grasses to large trees.
