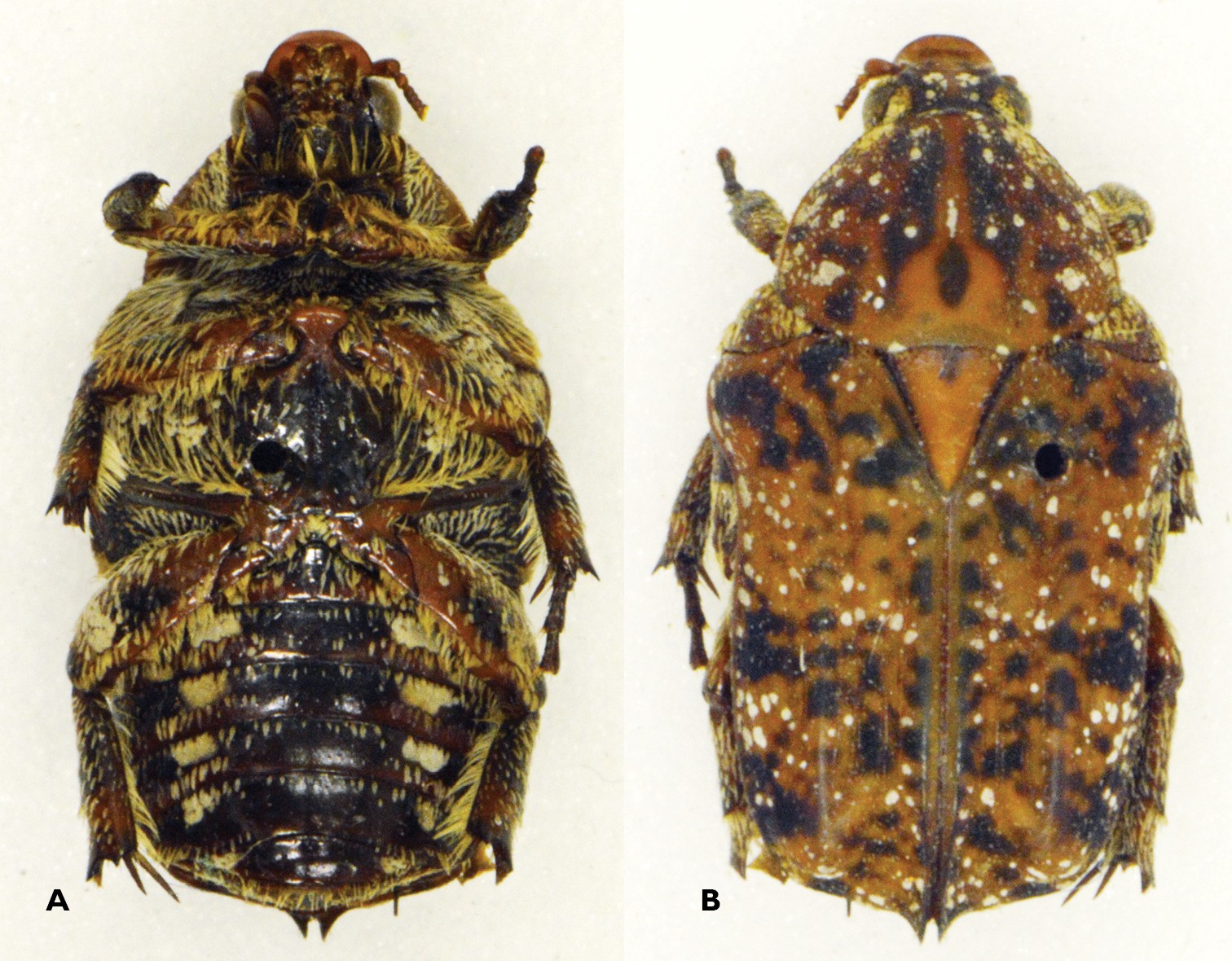

Scientific classification
- Kingdom: Animalia
- Phylum: Arthropoda
- Clade: Pancrustacea
- Class: Insecta
- Order: Coleoptera
- Suborder: Polyphaga
- Infraorder: Scarabaeiformia
- Family: Scarabaeidae
- Genus: Atrichelaphinis
- Species: A. rhodesiana

Binomial name
- Atrichelaphinis rhodesiana (Péringuey, 1907)

Synonyms
- Niphetophora rhodesiana Péringuey, 1907

= Atrichelaphinis rhodesiana =

Species of beetle

Atrichelaphinis rhodesiana is a species of beetle of the family Scarabaeidae. It is found in South Africa (where it is restricted to the eastern, wetter part of the country) and Zimbabwe.

== Description ==
Adults reach a length of about 10.2–12.6 mm (0.40–0.50 in) for males and 10.4–12.2 mm (0.41–0.48 in) for females. They are light brown with dark marks ranging from green to brown. The dark colour is at times covering virtually the entire surface. They are dull to shiny. There are white spots of tomentum scattered throughout and there is light pilisoty distributed on the vertex, along the lateral margins of the pronotum, on the elytra (mainly on the sides and apex) and the pygidium.

== Life history ==
It is normally found on a variety of flowers, fermenting fruit and sap flows.
