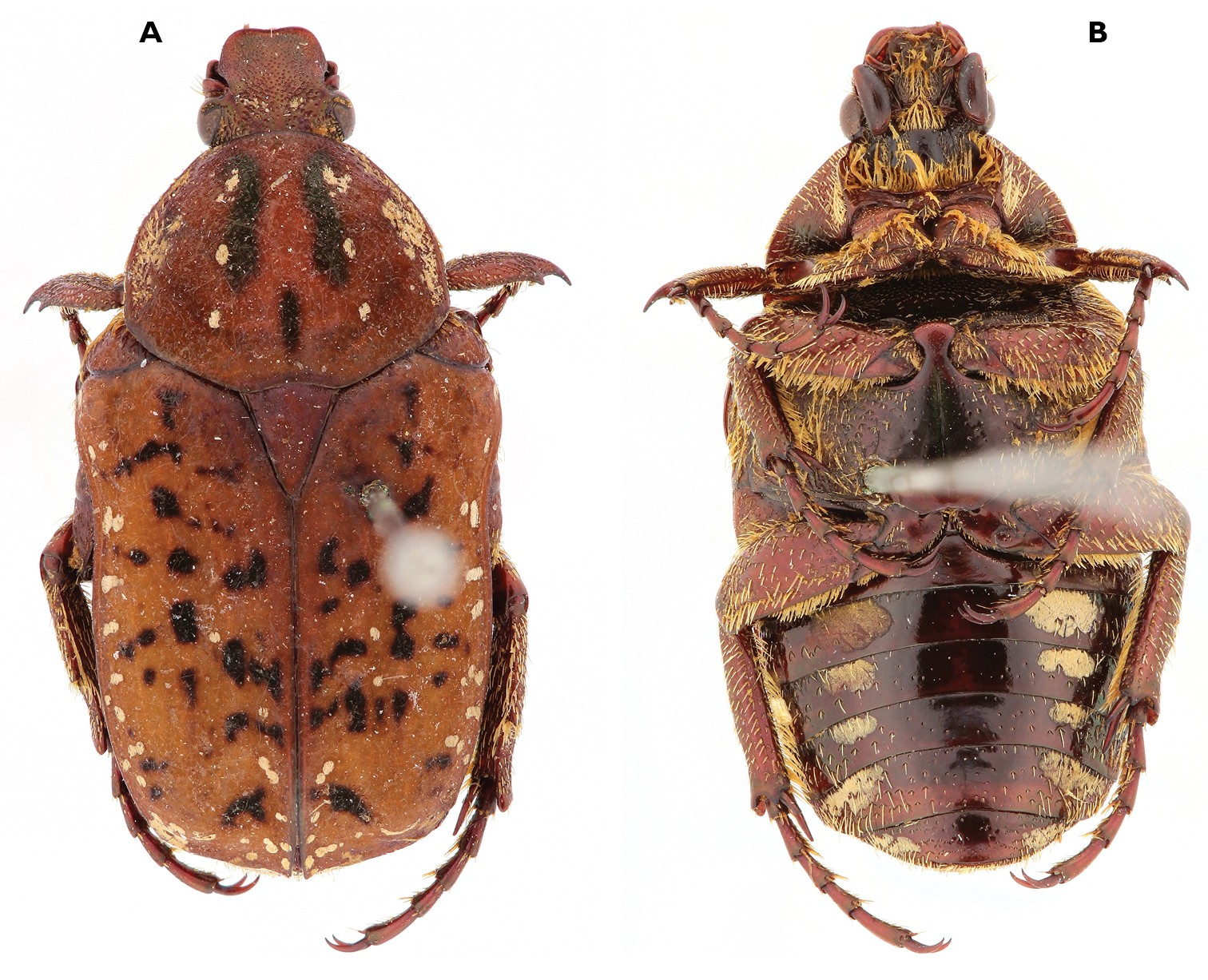

Scientific classification
- Kingdom: Animalia
- Phylum: Arthropoda
- Clade: Pancrustacea
- Class: Insecta
- Order: Coleoptera
- Suborder: Polyphaga
- Infraorder: Scarabaeiformia
- Family: Scarabaeidae
- Genus: Atrichelaphinis
- Species: A. simillima

Binomial name
- Atrichelaphinis simillima (Ancey, 1883)

Synonyms
- Elaphinis simillima Ancey, 1883

= Atrichelaphinis simillima =

Species of beetle

Atrichelaphinis simillima is a species of beetle of the family Scarabaeidae. It is found in Ethiopia.

== Description ==
Adults reach a length of about 9.4–13.4 mm (0.37–0.53 in) for males and 10.3–14.8 mm (0.41–0.58 in) for females. They are light brown, velutinous to shiny with dark markings never covering the whole surface, and always with lighter areas present.
