= APG IV system =

2016 revision of a flowering plant classification

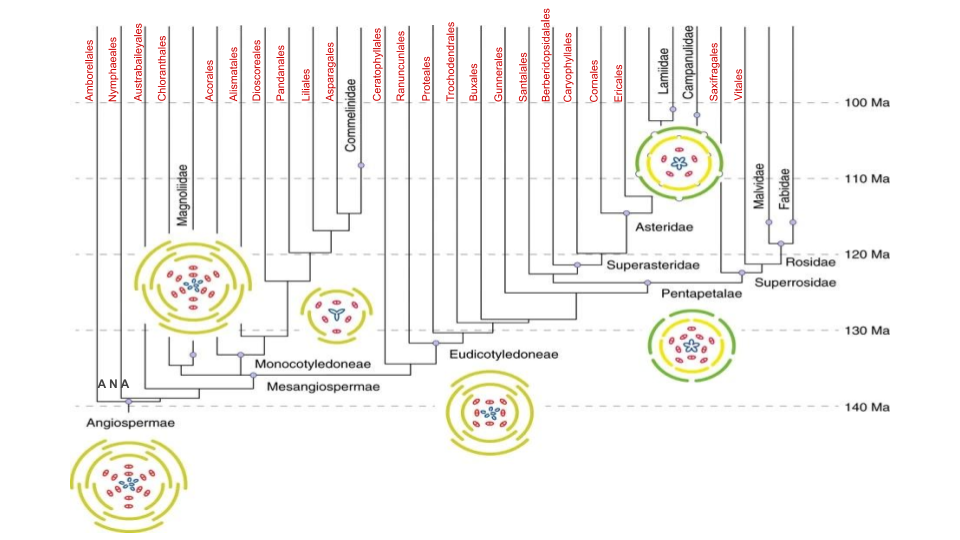
Evolution of angiosperms shown in diagram format, per APG IV

The APG IV system of flowering plant classification is the fourth version of a modern, mostly molecular-based, system of plant taxonomy for flowering plants (angiosperms) being developed by the Angiosperm Phylogeny Group (APG). It was published in 2016, seven years after its predecessor the APG III system was published in 2009, and 18 years after the first APG system was published in 1998. In 2009, a linear arrangement of the system was published separately; the APG IV paper includes such an arrangement, cross-referenced to the 2009 one.

Compared to the APG III system, the APG IV system recognizes five new orders (Boraginales, Dilleniales, Icacinales, Metteniusales and Vahliales), along with some new families, making a total of 64 angiosperm orders and 416 families. In general, the authors describe their philosophy as "conservative", based on making changes from APG III only where "a well-supported need" has been demonstrated. This has sometimes resulted in placements that are not compatible with published studies, but where further research is needed before the classification can be changed.

== Detailed version ==
Key to symbols used:

* = the family has been added or its circumscription changed since the APG III system of 2009
† = the order has been added since the APG III system

=== Basal angiosperms ===
- Amborellales Melikyan et al.
  - Amborellaceae Pichon, nom. cons.
- Nymphaeales Salisb. ex Bercht. & J.Presl
  - Hydatellaceae U.Hamann
  - Cabombaceae Rich. ex A.Rich., nom. cons.
  - Nymphaeaceae Salisb., nom. cons.
- Austrobaileyales Takht. ex Reveal
  - Austrobaileyaceae Croizat, nom. cons.
  - Trimeniaceae Gibbs, nom. cons.
  - Schisandraceae Blume, nom. cons.

=== Magnoliids ===
- Canellales Cronq.
  - Canellaceae Mart., nom. cons.
  - Winteraceae R.Br. ex Lindl., nom. cons.
- Piperales Bercht. & J.Presl
  - Saururaceae Rich. ex T.Lestib., nom. cons.
  - Piperaceae Giseke, nom. cons.
  - Aristolochiaceae Juss., nom. cons. * (including Asaraceae Vent., Hydnoraceae C.Agardh, nom. cons., Lactoridaceae Engl., nom. cons.)
- Magnoliales Juss. ex Bercht. & J.Presl
  - Myristicaceae R.Br., nom. cons.
  - Magnoliaceae Juss., nom. cons.
  - Degeneriaceae I.W.Bailey & A.C.Sm., nom. cons.
  - Himantandraceae Diels, nom. cons.
  - Eupomatiaceae Orb., nom. cons.
  - Annonaceae Juss., nom. cons.
- Laurales Juss. ex Bercht. & J.Presl
  - Calycanthaceae Lindl., nom. cons.
  - Siparunaceae Schodde
  - Gomortegaceae Reiche, nom. cons.
  - Atherospermataceae R.Br.
  - Hernandiaceae Blume, nom. cons.
  - Monimiaceae Juss., nom. cons.
  - Lauraceae Juss., nom. cons.

=== Independent lineage: unplaced to more inclusive clade ===
- Chloranthales Mart.
  - Chloranthaceae R.Br. ex Sims, nom. cons.

=== Monocots ===
- Acorales Mart.
  - Acoraceae Martinov
- Alismatales R.Br. ex Bercht. & J.Presl
  - Araceae Juss., nom. cons.
  - Tofieldiaceae Takht.
  - Alismataceae Vent., nom. cons.
  - Butomaceae Mirb., nom. cons.
  - Hydrocharitaceae Juss., nom. cons.
  - Scheuchzeriaceae F.Rudolphi, nom. cons.
  - Aponogetonaceae Planch., nom. cons.
  - Juncaginaceae Rich., nom. cons. *
  - Maundiaceae Nakai *
  - Zosteraceae Dumort., nom. cons.
  - Potamogetonaceae Bercht. & J.Presl, nom. cons
  - Posidoniaceae Vines, nom. cons.
  - Ruppiaceae Horan., nom. cons.
  - Cymodoceaceae Vines, nom. cons.
- Petrosaviales Takht.
  - Petrosaviaceae Hutch., nom. cons.
- Dioscoreales Mart.
  - Nartheciaceae Fr. ex Bjurzon
  - Burmanniaceae Blume, nom. cons. (not monophyletic.)
  - Dioscoreaceae R.Br., nom. cons.
- Pandanales R.Br. ex Bercht. & J.Presl
  - Triuridaceae Gardner, nom. cons.
  - Velloziaceae J.Agardh, nom. cons.
  - Stemonaceae Caruel, nom. cons.
  - Cyclanthaceae Poit. ex A.Rich., nom. cons.
  - Pandanaceae R.Br., nom. cons.
- Liliales Perleb
  - Campynemataceae Dumort.
  - Corsiaceae Becc., nom. cons.
  - Melanthiaceae Batsch ex Borkh., nom. cons.
  - Petermanniaceae Hutch, nom. cons.
  - Alstroemeriaceae Dumort., nom. cons.
  - Colchicaceae DC., nom. cons.
  - Philesiaceae Dumort., nom. cons.
  - Ripogonaceae Conran & Clifford
  - Smilacaceae Vent., nom. cons.
  - Liliaceae Juss., nom. cons.
- Asparagales Link
  - Orchidaceae Juss., nom. cons.
  - Boryaceae M.W.Chase et al.
  - Blandfordiaceae R.Dahlgren & Clifford
  - Asteliaceae Dumort.
  - Lanariaceae H.Huber ex R.Dahlgren
  - Hypoxidaceae R.Br., nom. cons.
  - Doryanthaceae R.Dahlgren & Clifford
  - Ixioliriaceae Nakai (as 'Ixiolirionaceae'; spelling corrected)
  - Tecophilaeaceae Leyb., nom. cons.
  - Iridaceae Juss., nom. cons.
  - Xeronemataceae M.W.Chase et al.
  - Asphodelaceae Juss., nom. cons. prop. (including Xanthorrhoeaceae Dumort., nom. cons.)
  - Amaryllidaceae J.St.-Hil., nom. cons.
  - Asparagaceae Juss., nom. cons.
- Arecales Bromhead
  - Dasypogonaceae Dumort.
  - Arecaceae Bercht. & J.Presl, nom. cons. (=Palmae Juss., nom. cons.)
- Commelinales Mirb. ex Bercht. & J.Presl
  - Hanguanaceae Airy Shaw
  - Commelinaceae Mirb., nom. cons.
  - Philydraceae Link, nom. cons.
  - Pontederiaceae Kunth, nom. cons.
  - Haemodoraceae R.Br., nom. cons.
- Zingiberales Griseb.
  - Strelitziaceae Hutch., nom. cons.
  - Lowiaceae Ridl., nom. cons.
  - Heliconiaceae Vines
  - Musaceae Juss., nom. cons.
  - Cannaceae Juss., nom. cons.
  - Marantaceae R.Br., nom. cons.
  - Costaceae Nakai
  - Zingiberaceae Martinov, nom. cons.
- Poales Small
  - Typhaceae Juss., nom. cons.
  - Bromeliaceae Juss., nom. cons.
  - Rapateaceae Dumort., nom. cons.
  - Xyridaceae C.Agardh, nom. cons.
  - Eriocaulaceae Martinov, nom. cons.
  - Mayacaceae Kunth, nom. cons.
  - Thurniaceae Engl., nom. cons.
  - Juncaceae Juss., nom. cons.
  - Cyperaceae Juss., nom. cons.
  - Restionaceae R.Br., nom. cons. * (including Anarthriaceae D.W.Cutler & Airy Shaw, Centrolepidaceae Endl., nom. cons.)
  - Flagellariaceae Dumort., nom. cons.
  - Joinvilleaceae Toml. & A.C.Sm.
  - Ecdeiocoleaceae D.W.Cutler & Airy Shaw
  - Poaceae Barnhart, nom. cons. (= Gramineae Juss., nom. cons.)

=== Probable sister of eudicots ===
- Ceratophyllales Link
  - Ceratophyllaceae Gray, nom. cons.

=== Eudicots ===
- Ranunculales Juss. ex Bercht. & J.Presl
  - Eupteleaceae K.Wilh., nom. cons.
  - Papaveraceae Juss., nom. cons.
  - Circaeasteraceae Hutch., nom. cons.
  - Lardizabalaceae R.Br., nom. cons.
  - Menispermaceae Juss., nom. cons.
  - Berberidaceae Juss., nom. cons.
  - Ranunculaceae Juss., nom. cons.
- Proteales Juss. ex Bercht. & J.Presl
  - Sabiaceae Blume, nom. cons.
  - Nelumbonaceae A.Rich., nom. cons.
  - Platanaceae T.Lestib., nom. cons.
  - Proteaceae Juss., nom. cons.
- Trochodendrales Takht. ex Cronq.
  - Trochodendraceae Eichler, nom. cons.
- Buxales Takht. ex Reveal
  - Buxaceae Dumort., nom. cons. * (including Haptanthaceae C.Nelson)

=== Core eudicots ===
- Gunnerales Takht. ex Reveal
  - Myrothamnaceae Nied., nom. cons.
  - Gunneraceae Meisn., nom. cons.
- Dilleniales DC. ex Bercht. & J.Presl †
  - Dilleniaceae Salisb., nom. cons.

=== Superrosids ===
- Saxifragales Bercht. & J.Presl
  - Peridiscaceae Kuhlm., nom. cons.
  - Paeoniaceae Raf., nom. cons.
  - Altingiaceae Lindl., nom. cons.
  - Hamamelidaceae R.Br., nom. cons.
  - Cercidiphyllaceae Engl., nom. cons.
  - Daphniphyllaceae Müll.Arg., nom. cons.
  - Iteaceae J.Agardh, nom. cons.
  - Grossulariaceae DC., nom. cons.
  - Saxifragaceae Juss., nom. cons.
  - Crassulaceae J.St.-Hil., nom. cons.
  - Aphanopetalaceae Doweld
  - Tetracarpaeaceae Nakai
  - Penthoraceae Rydb. ex Britton, nom. cons.
  - Haloragaceae R.Br., nom. cons.
  - Cynomoriaceae Endl. ex Lindl., nom. cons.

==== Rosids ====
- Vitales Juss. ex Bercht. & J.Presl
  - Vitaceae Juss., nom. cons.

===== Fabids =====
- Zygophyllales Link
  - Krameriaceae Dumort., nom. cons.
  - Zygophyllaceae R.Br., nom. cons.
- Fabales Bromhead
  - Quillajaceae D.Don
  - Fabaceae Lindl., nom. cons. (= Leguminosae Juss., nom. cons.)
  - Surianaceae Arn., nom. cons.
  - Polygalaceae Hoffmanns. & Link, nom. cons.
- Rosales Bercht. & J.Presl
  - Rosaceae Juss., nom. cons.
  - Barbeyaceae Rendle, nom. cons.
  - Dirachmaceae Hutch.
  - Elaeagnaceae Juss., nom. cons.
  - Rhamnaceae Juss., nom. cons.
  - Ulmaceae Mirb., nom. cons.
  - Cannabaceae Martinov, nom. cons.
  - Moraceae Gaudich., nom. cons.
  - Urticaceae Juss., nom. cons.
- Fagales Engl.
  - Nothofagaceae Kuprian.
  - Fagaceae Dumort., nom. cons.
  - Myricaceae Rich. ex Kunth, nom. cons.
  - Juglandaceae DC. ex Perleb, nom. cons.
  - Casuarinaceae R.Br., nom. cons.
  - Ticodendraceae Gomez-Laur. & L.D.Gomez
  - Betulaceae Gray, nom. cons.
- Cucurbitales Juss. ex Bercht. & J.Presl
  - Apodanthaceae Tiegh. ex Takht. *
  - Anisophylleaceae Ridl.
  - Corynocarpaceae Engl., nom. cons.
  - Coriariaceae DC., nom. cons.
  - Cucurbitaceae Juss., nom. cons.
  - Tetramelaceae Airy Shaw
  - Datiscaceae Dumort., nom. cons.
  - Begoniaceae C.Agardh, nom. cons.

====== COM clade; placement uncertain ======
- Celastrales Link
  - Lepidobotryaceae J. Leonard, nom. cons.
  - Celastraceae R.Br., nom. cons.
- Oxalidales Bercht. & J.Presl
  - Huaceae A.Chev.
  - Connaraceae R.Br., nom. cons.
  - Oxalidaceae R.Br., nom. cons.
  - Cunoniaceae R.Br., nom. cons.
  - Elaeocarpaceae Juss., nom. cons.
  - Cephalotaceae Dumort., nom. cons.
  - Brunelliaceae Engl., nom. cons.
- Malpighiales Juss. ex Bercht. & J.Presl
  - Pandaceae Engl. & Gilg, nom. cons.
  - Irvingiaceae Exell & Mendonça, nom. cons. * (including Allantospermum Forman)
  - Ctenolophonaceae Exell & Mendonça
  - Rhizophoraceae Pers., nom. cons.
  - Erythroxylaceae Kunth, nom. cons.
  - Ochnaceae DC., nom. cons.
  - Bonnetiaceae L.Beauvis. ex Nakai
  - Clusiaceae Lindl., nom. cons. (= Guttiferae Juss., nom. cons.)
  - Calophyllaceae J.Agardh
  - Podostemaceae Rich. ex Kunth, nom. cons.
  - Hypericaceae Juss., nom. cons.
  - Caryocaraceae Voigt, nom. cons.
  - Lophopyxidaceae H.Pfeiff.
  - Putranjivaceae Meisn.
  - Centroplacaceae Doweld & Reveal
  - Elatinaceae Dumort., nom. cons.
  - Malpighiaceae Juss., nom. cons.
  - Balanopaceae Benth. & Hook.f., nom. cons.
  - Trigoniaceae A.Juss., nom. cons.
  - Dichapetalaceae Baill., nom. cons.
  - Euphroniaceae Marc.-Berti
  - Chrysobalanaceae R.Br., nom. cons.
  - Humiriaceae A.Juss., nom. cons.
  - Achariaceae Harms, nom. cons.
  - Violaceae Batsch, nom. cons.
  - Goupiaceae Miers
  - Passifloraceae Juss. ex Roussel, nom. cons.
  - Lacistemataceae Mart., nom. cons.
  - Salicaceae Mirb., nom. cons.
  - Peraceae Klotzsch *
  - Rafflesiaceae Dumort., nom. cons.
  - Euphorbiaceae Juss., nom. cons. *
  - Linaceae DC. ex Perleb, nom. cons.
  - Ixonanthaceae Planch. ex Miq., nom. cons. *
  - Picrodendraceae Small, nom. cons.
  - Phyllanthaceae Martinov, nom. cons.

===== Malvids =====
- Geraniales Juss. ex Bercht. & J.Presl
  - Geraniaceae Juss., nom. cons.
  - Francoaceae A.Juss., nom. cons. * (including Bersamaceae Doweld, Greyiaceae Hutch., nom. cons., Ledocarpaceae Meyen, Melianthaceae Horan., nom. cons., Rhynchothecaceae A.Juss., Vivianiaceae Klotzsch, nom. cons.)
- Myrtales Juss. ex Bercht. & J.Presl
  - Combretaceae R.Br., nom. cons.
  - Lythraceae J.St.-Hil., nom. cons.
  - Onagraceae Juss., nom. cons.
  - Vochysiaceae A.St.-Hil., nom. cons.
  - Myrtaceae Juss., nom. cons.
  - Melastomataceae Juss., nom. cons.
  - Crypteroniaceae A.DC., nom. cons.
  - Alzateaceae S.A.Graham
  - Penaeaceae Sweet ex Guill., nom. cons.
- Crossosomatales Takht. ex Reveal
  - Aphloiaceae Takht.
  - Geissolomataceae A.DC., nom. cons.
  - Strasburgeriaceae Tiegh., nom. cons.
  - Staphyleaceae Martinov, nom. cons.
  - Guamatelaceae S.H.Oh & D.Potter
  - Stachyuraceae J.Agardh, nom. cons.
  - Crossosomataceae Engl., nom. cons.
- Picramniales Doweld
  - Picramniaceae Fernando & Quinn
- Huerteales Doweld
  - Gerrardinaceae M.H.Alford
  - Petenaeaceae Christenh. et al. *
  - Tapisciaceae Takht.
  - Dipentodontaceae Merr., nom. cons.
- Sapindales Juss. ex Bercht. & J.Presl
  - Biebersteiniaceae Schnizl.
  - Nitrariaceae Lindl.
  - Kirkiaceae Takht.
  - Burseraceae Kunth, nom. cons.
  - Anacardiaceae R.Br., nom. cons.
  - Sapindaceae Juss., nom. cons. (including Xanthocerataceae Buerki et al., as 'Xanthoceraceae')
  - Rutaceae Juss., nom. cons.
  - Simaroubaceae DC., nom. cons.
  - Meliaceae Juss., nom. cons.
- Malvales Juss. ex Bercht. & J.Presl
  - Cytinaceae A.Rich.
  - Muntingiaceae C.Bayer et al.
  - Neuradaceae Kostel., nom. cons.
  - Malvaceae Juss., nom. cons.
  - Sphaerosepalaceae Bullock
  - Thymelaeaceae Juss., nom. cons.
  - Bixaceae Kunth, nom. cons.
  - Cistaceae Juss., nom. cons. * (including Pakaraimaea Maguire & P.S.Ashton)
  - Sarcolaenaceae Caruel, nom. cons.
  - Dipterocarpaceae Blume, nom. cons. *
- Brassicales Bromhead
  - Akaniaceae Stapf, nom. cons.
  - Tropaeolaceae Juss. ex DC., nom. cons.
  - Moringaceae Martinov, nom. cons.
  - Caricaceae Dumort., nom. cons.
  - Limnanthaceae R.Br., nom. cons.
  - Setchellanthaceae Iltis
  - Koeberliniaceae Engl., nom. cons.
  - Bataceae Mart. ex Perleb, nom. cons.
  - Salvadoraceae Lindl., nom. cons.
  - Emblingiaceae Airy Shaw
  - Tovariaceae Pax, nom. cons.
  - Pentadiplandraceae Hutch. & Dalziel
  - Gyrostemonaceae A.Juss., nom. cons.
  - Resedaceae Martinov, nom. cons. * (including Borthwickiaceae J.X.Su et al., Stixidaceae Doweld as 'Stixaceae', Forchhammeria Liebm.)
  - Capparaceae Juss., nom. cons. *
  - Cleomaceae Bercht. & J.Presl
  - Brassicaceae Burnett, nom. cons. (= Cruciferae Juss., nom. cons.)

=== Superasterids ===
- Berberidopsidales Doweld
  - Aextoxicaceae Engl. & Gilg, nom. cons.
  - Berberidopsidaceae Takht.
- Santalales R.Br. ex Bercht. & J.Presl
  - Olacaceae R.Br., nom. cons. (not monophyletic; including Aptandraceae Miers, Coulaceae Tiegh., Erythropalaceae Planch. ex Miq., nom. cons., Octoknemaceae Soler. nom. cons., Strombosiaceae Tiegh., Ximeniaceae Horan.)
  - Opiliaceae Valeton, nom. cons.
  - Balanophoraceae Rich., nom. cons.
  - Santalaceae R.Br., nom. cons. (not monophyletic if Balanophoraceae are embedded; including Amphorogynaceae Nickrent & Der, Cervantesiaceae Nickrent & Der, Comandraceae Nickrent & Der, Nanodeaceae Nickrent & Der, Thesiaceae Vest, Viscaceae Batsch)
  - Misodendraceae J.Agardh, nom. cons.
  - Schoepfiaceae Blume
  - Loranthaceae Juss., nom. cons.
- Caryophyllales Juss. ex Bercht. & J.Presl
  - Frankeniaceae Desv., nom. cons.
  - Tamaricaceae Link, nom. cons.
  - Plumbaginaceae Juss., nom. cons.
  - Polygonaceae Juss., nom. cons.
  - Droseraceae Salisb., nom. cons.
  - Nepenthaceae Dumort, nom. cons.
  - Drosophyllaceae Chrtek et al.
  - Dioncophyllaceae Airy Shaw, nom. cons.
  - Ancistrocladaceae Planch. ex Walp., nom. cons.
  - Rhabdodendraceae Prance
  - Simmondsiaceae Tiegh.
  - Physenaceae Takht.
  - Asteropeiaceae Takht. ex Reveal & Hoogland
  - Macarthuriaceae Christenh. *
  - Microteaceae Schäferhoff & Borsch *
  - Caryophyllaceae Juss., nom. cons.
  - Achatocarpaceae Heimerl, nom. cons.
  - Amaranthaceae Juss., nom. cons.
  - Stegnospermataceae Nakai
  - Limeaceae Shipunov ex Reveal *
  - Lophiocarpaceae Doweld & Reveal
  - Kewaceae Christenh. *
  - Barbeuiaceae Nakai
  - Gisekiaceae Nakai
  - Aizoaceae Martinov, nom. cons.
  - Phytolaccaceae R.Br., nom. cons. *
  - Petiveriaceae C.Agardh * (including Rivinaceae C.Agardh)
  - Sarcobataceae Behnke
  - Nyctaginaceae Juss., nom. cons.
  - Molluginaceae Bartl., nom. cons. *
  - Montiaceae Raf.
  - Didiereaceae Radlk., nom. cons.
  - Basellaceae Raf., nom. cons.
  - Halophytaceae S.Soriano
  - Talinaceae Doweld
  - Portulacaceae Juss., nom. cons.
  - Anacampserotaceae Eggli & Nyffeler
  - Cactaceae Juss., nom. cons.

==== Asterids ====
- Cornales Link
  - Nyssaceae Juss. ex Dumort., nom. cons.
  - Hydrostachyaceae Engl., nom. cons.
  - Hydrangeaceae Dumort., nom. cons.
  - Loasaceae Juss., nom. cons.
  - Curtisiaceae Takht.
  - Grubbiaceae Endl. ex Meisn., nom. cons.
  - Cornaceae Bercht. & J.Presl, nom. cons.
- Ericales Bercht. & J.Presl
  - Balsaminaceae A.Rich., nom. cons.
  - Marcgraviaceae Bercht. & J.Presl, nom. cons.
  - Tetrameristaceae Hutch.
  - Fouquieriaceae DC., nom. cons.
  - Polemoniaceae Juss., nom. cons.
  - Lecythidaceae A.Rich., nom. cons.
  - Sladeniaceae Airy Shaw
  - Pentaphylacaceae Engl., nom. cons.
  - Sapotaceae Juss., nom. cons.
  - Ebenaceae Gürke, nom. cons.
  - Primulaceae Batsch ex Borkh., nom. cons.
  - Theaceae Mirb., nom. cons.
  - Symplocaceae Desf., nom. cons.
  - Diapensiaceae Lindl., nom. cons.
  - Styracaceae DC. & Spreng., nom. cons.
  - Sarraceniaceae Dumort., nom. cons.
  - Roridulaceae Martinov, nom. cons.
  - Actinidiaceae Gilg & Werderm., nom. cons.
  - Clethraceae Klotzsch, nom. cons.
  - Cyrillaceae Lindl., nom. cons.
  - Ericaceae Juss., nom. cons.
  - Mitrastemonaceae Makino, nom. cons. (placement in order unclear)

===== Lamiids =====
- Icacinales Tiegh. †
  - Oncothecaceae Kobuski ex Airy Shaw
  - Icacinaceae Miers, nom. cons. *
- Metteniusales Takht. †
  - Metteniusaceae H.Karst. ex Schnizl. *
- Garryales Mart.
  - Eucommiaceae Engl., nom. cons.
  - Garryaceae Lindl., nom. cons.
- Gentianales Juss. ex Bercht. & J.Presl
  - Rubiaceae Juss., nom. cons.
  - Gentianaceae Juss., nom. cons.
  - Loganiaceae R.Br. ex Mart., nom. cons.
  - Gelsemiaceae L.Struwe & V.A.Albert * (including Pteleocarpaceae Brummitt)
  - Apocynaceae Juss., nom. cons.
- Boraginales Juss. ex Bercht. & J.Presl †
  - Boraginaceae Juss., nom. cons. (including Codonaceae Weigend & Hilger)
- Vahliales Doweld †
  - Vahliaceae Dandy
- Solanales Juss. ex Bercht. & J.Presl
  - Convolvulaceae Juss., nom. cons.
  - Solanaceae Juss., nom. cons.
  - Montiniaceae Nakai, nom. cons.
  - Sphenocleaceae T.Baskerv., nom. cons.
  - Hydroleaceae R.Br.
- Lamiales Bromhead
  - Plocospermataceae Hutch.
  - Carlemanniaceae Airy Shaw
  - Oleaceae Hoffmanns. & Link, nom. cons.
  - Tetrachondraceae Wettst.
  - Calceolariaceae Olmstead
  - Gesneriaceae Rich. & Juss., nom. cons. * (the position of Peltanthera Benth. is problematic and here considered unplaced to family)
  - Plantaginaceae Juss., nom. cons.
  - Scrophulariaceae Juss., nom. cons.
  - Stilbaceae Kunth, nom. cons.
  - Linderniaceae Borsch et al.
  - Byblidaceae Domin, nom. cons.
  - Martyniaceae Horan., nom. cons.
  - Pedaliaceae R.Br., nom. cons.
  - Acanthaceae Juss., nom. cons.
  - Bignoniaceae Juss., nom. cons.
  - Lentibulariaceae Rich., nom. cons.
  - Schlegeliaceae Reveal
  - Thomandersiaceae Sreem.
  - Verbenaceae J.St.Hil., nom. cons.
  - Lamiaceae Martinov, nom. cons. (= Labiatae Juss., nom. cons.)
  - Mazaceae Reveal
  - Phrymaceae Schauer, nom. cons. *
  - Paulowniaceae Nakai
  - Orobanchaceae Vent., nom. cons. * (including Lindenbergiaceae Doweld, Rehmanniaceae Reveal)

===== Campanulids =====
- Aquifoliales Senft
  - Stemonuraceae Kårehed
  - Cardiopteridaceae Blume, nom. cons.
  - Phyllonomaceae Small
  - Helwingiaceae Decne.
  - Aquifoliaceae Bercht. & J.Presl, nom. cons.
- Asterales Link
  - Rousseaceae DC.
  - Campanulaceae Juss., nom. cons.
  - Pentaphragmataceae J.Agardh, nom. cons.
  - Stylidiaceae R.Br., nom. cons.
  - Alseuosmiaceae Airy Shaw
  - Phellinaceae Takht.
  - Argophyllaceae Takht.
  - Menyanthaceae Dumort., nom. cons.
  - Goodeniaceae R.Br., nom. cons.
  - Calyceraceae R.Br. ex Rich., nom. cons.
  - Asteraceae Bercht. & J.Presl, nom. cons. (= Compositae Giseke, nom. cons.)
- Escalloniales Link
  - Escalloniaceae R.Br. ex Dumort., nom. cons.
- Bruniales Dumort.
  - Columelliaceae D.Don, nom. cons.
  - Bruniaceae R.Br. ex DC., nom. cons.
- Paracryphiales Takht. ex Reveal
  - Paracryphiaceae Airy Shaw
- Dipsacales Juss. ex Bercht. & J.Presl
  - Adoxaceae E.Mey., nom. cons. (= Viburnaceae Raf., nom. cons. prop.)
  - Caprifoliaceae Juss., nom. cons.
- Apiales Nakai
  - Pennantiaceae J.Agardh
  - Torricelliaceae Hu
  - Griseliniaceae Takht., nom. cons. prop.
  - Pittosporaceae R.Br., nom. cons.
  - Araliaceae Juss., nom. cons.
  - Myodocarpaceae Doweld
  - Apiaceae Lindl., nom. cons. (= Umbelliferae Juss., nom. cons.)

== Phylogeny ==
Like the earlier APG systems, the APG IV revision is based on a phylogenetic tree for the angiosperms, as shown below.

- angiosperms
  - Amborellales
  - - Nymphaeales
    - - Austrobaileyales
      - Core angiosperms
        - Chloranthales
        - magnoliids
          - - Magnoliales
            - Laurales
          - - Piperales
            - Canellales
        - - monocots
            - Acorales
            - - Alismatales
              - - Petrosaviales
                - - - Pandanales
                    - Dioscoreales
                  - - Liliales
                    - - Asparagales
                      - commelinids
                        - Arecales
                        - - Poales
                          - - Commelinales
                            - Zingiberales
          - - Ceratophyllales
            - eudicots
              - Ranunculales
              - - Proteales
                - - Trochodendrales
                  - - Buxales
                    - core eudicots
                      (continued)

- core eudicots
  - Gunnerales
  - Pentapetalae
    - Dilleniales
    - superrosids
      - Saxifragales
      - rosids
        - Vitales
        - - fabids
            - Zygophyllales
            - - - Fabales
                - - Rosales
                  - - Fagales
                    - Cucurbitales
              - - Celastrales
                - - Malpighiales
                  - Oxalidales
          - malvids
            - - Geraniales
              - Myrtales
            - - Crossosomatales
              - - Picramniales
                - - Sapindales
                  - - Huerteales
                    - - Brassicales
                      - Malvales
    - superasterids
      - Berberidopsidales
      - - Santalales
        - - Caryophyllales
          - asterids
            - Cornales
            - - Ericales
              - - campanulids
                  - Aquifoliales
                  - - Asterales
                    - Escalloniales
                    - - Bruniales
                      - - Apiales
                        - - Dipsacales
                          - Paracryphiales
                - lamiids
                  - Icacinales
                  - - Metteniusales
                    - - Garryales
                      - - Boraginales
                        - Gentianales
                        - Vahliales
                        - Lamiales
                        - Solanales

== Bibliography ==
- Angiosperm Phylogeny Group (2009), "An update of the Angiosperm Phylogeny Group classification for the orders and families of flowering plants: APG III", Botanical Journal of the Linnean Society, 161 (2): 105–121, doi:10.1111/j.1095-8339.2009.00996.x, hdl:10654/18083
- Angiosperm Phylogeny Group (2016), "An update of the Angiosperm Phylogeny Group classification for the orders and families of flowering plants: APG IV", Botanical Journal of the Linnean Society, 181 (1): 1–20, doi:10.1111/boj.12385
- Haston, E.; Richardson, J.E.; Stevens, P.F.; Chase, M.W. & Harris, D.J. (2009), "The Linear Angiosperm Phylogeny Group (LAPG) III: a linear sequence of the families in APG III", Botanical Journal of the Linnean Society, 161 (2): 128–131, doi:10.1111/j.1095-8339.2009.01000.x
- Fay, Michael (9 May 2016), "APG - classification by consensus", Kew Science, RBG Kew, archived from the original on 2016-08-05
- Cole, Theodor C.H.; Hilger, Hartmut H. & Stevens, Peter F. (2019), Angiosperm Phylogeny Poster - Flowering Plant Systematics (PDF)
