= Axinandra zeylanica =

Conservation status
- Vulnerable (IUCN 2.3)

Scientific classification
- Kingdom: Plantae
- Clade: Tracheophytes
- Clade: Angiosperms
- Clade: Eudicots
- Clade: Rosids
- Order: Myrtales
- Family: Crypteroniaceae
- Genus: Axinandra
- Species: A. zeylanica

Binomial name
- Axinandra zeylanica Thwaites

Species of flowering plant

Axinandra zeylanica is a species of plant in the Crypteroniaceae family. It is endemic to Sri Lanka, where locally known as "pol hunna - පොල් හුන්න".
