= Crypteronia elegans =

Scientific classification
- Kingdom: Plantae
- Clade: Tracheophytes
- Clade: Angiosperms
- Clade: Eudicots
- Clade: Rosids
- Order: Myrtales
- Family: Crypteroniaceae
- Genus: Crypteronia
- Species: C. elegans

Binomial name
- Crypteronia elegans J.T. Pereira & K.M. Wong, 1995

Species of flowering plant

Crypteronia elegans is a species of flowering trees in the family Crypteroniaceae. It is found in Borneo (Sarawak).
