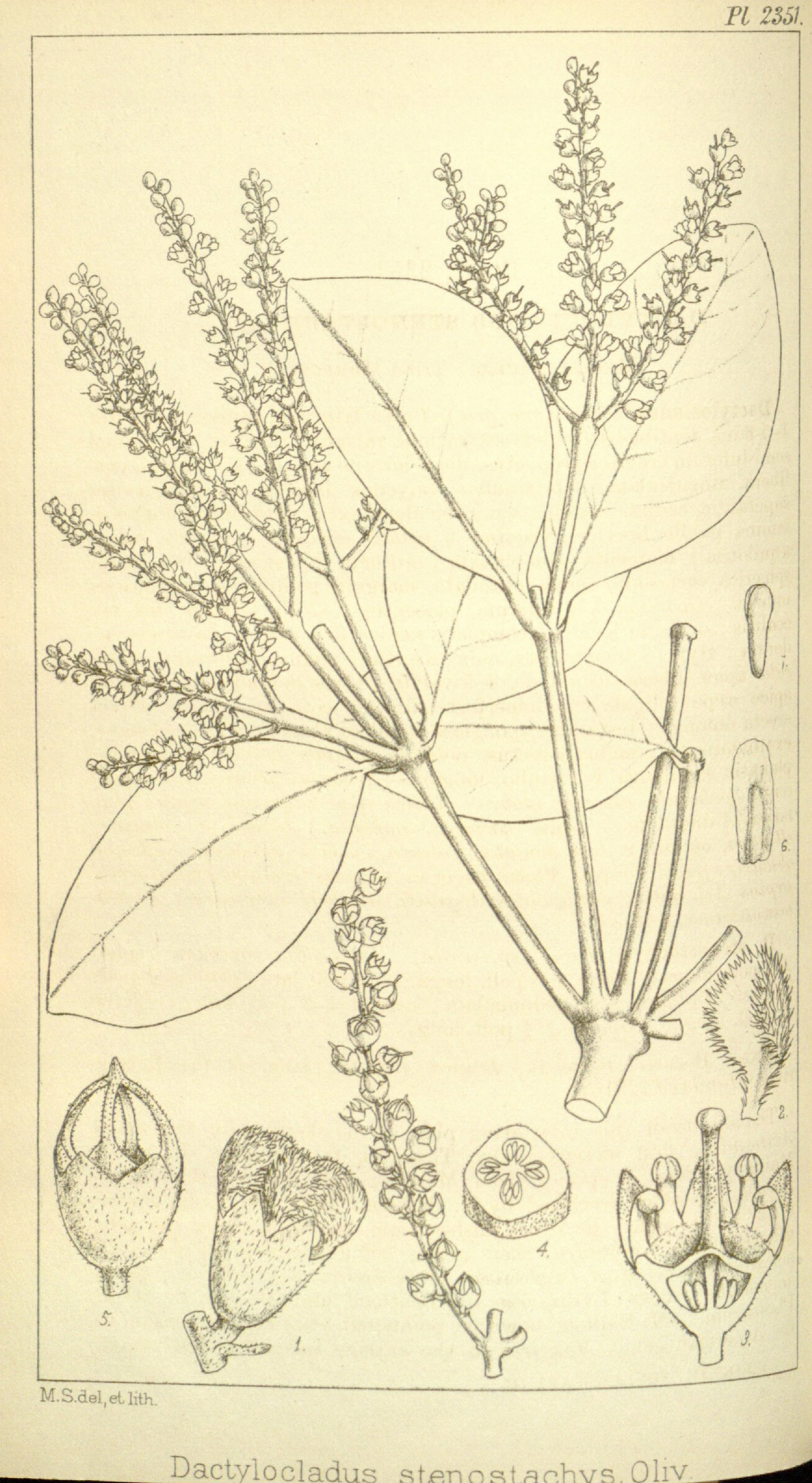
- Dactylocladus stenostachys in Hooker's Icones Plantarum

Scientific classification
- Kingdom: Plantae
- Clade: Tracheophytes
- Clade: Angiosperms
- Clade: Eudicots
- Clade: Rosids
- Order: Myrtales
- Family: Crypteroniaceae
- Genus: Dactylocladus; Oliv.
- Species: D. stenostachys

Binomial name
- Dactylocladus stenostachys Oliv.

= Dactylocladus =

Monotypic genus of trees

Dactylocladus is a monotypic genus of trees in the family Crypteroniaceae. It contains the single species Dactylocladus stenostachys. The generic name means "finger twigs", referring to the branching of the twigs. The specific epithet stenostachys means "small spike", referring to the inflorescence.

== Description ==
Dactylocladus stenostachys grows as a tree up to 40 metres (130 ft) tall, with a trunk diameter of up to 150 cm (60 in). Its bark is brown to grey initially, turning reddish brown and scaly in the mature tree. The elliptic leaves measure up to 10 cm (4 in) long. The timber is used for flooring and furniture.

== Distribution and habitat ==
Dactylocladus stenostachys is endemic to Borneo. Its habitat is in peat swamp forest, occasionally in kerangas forest.
