= Crypteronia =

Scientific classification
- Kingdom: Plantae
- Clade: Tracheophytes
- Clade: Angiosperms
- Clade: Eudicots
- Clade: Rosids
- Order: Myrtales
- Family: Crypteroniaceae
- Genus: Crypteronia; Blume 1826

Type species
- Crypteronia paniculata Blume

Genus of flowering plants

Crypteronia is a genus of flowering trees and shrubs in the family Crypteroniaceae. The genus includes seven species, ranging from eastern India through Southeast Asia and southern China to the Malay Peninsula, Indonesia and New Guinea.

== Species ==
Plants of the World Online lists:

- Crypteronia borneensis J.T. Pereira & Wong
- Crypteronia cumingii (Planch.) Endl.
- Crypteronia elegans J.T. Pereira & Wong
- Crypteronia glabriflora J.T. Pereira & Wong
- Crypteronia griffithii C.B. Clarke
- Crypteronia macrophylla Beus.-Osinga
- Crypteronia paniculata Blume
