= Axinandra =

Scientific classification
- Kingdom: Plantae
- Clade: Tracheophytes
- Clade: Angiosperms
- Clade: Eudicots
- Clade: Rosids
- Order: Myrtales
- Family: Crypteroniaceae
- Genus: Axinandra; Thwaites

Genus of flowering plants

Axinandra is a genus of plant in family Crypteroniaceae. It contains the following species:

- Axinandra alata Baill.
- Axinandra beccariana Baill.
- Axinandra coriacea Baill.
- Axinandra zeylanica Thwaites
