= Angiosperm Phylogeny Group =

Collaborative research group for the classification of flowering plants

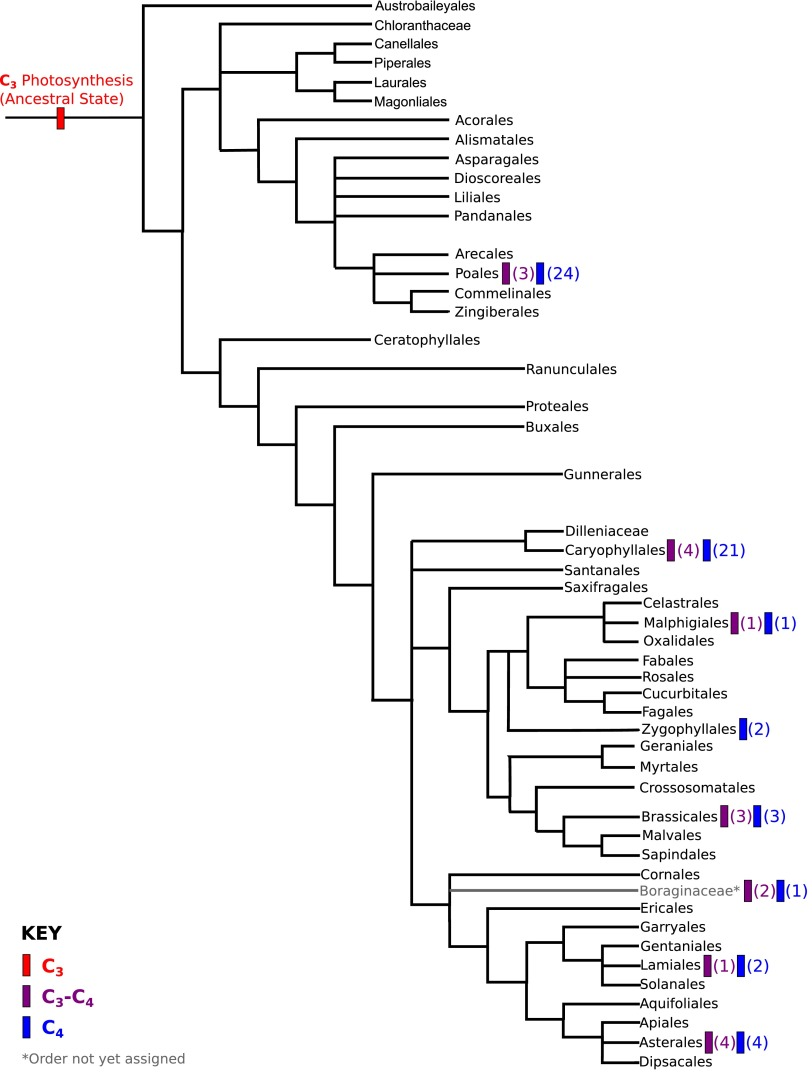
Evolution of the angiosperms according to the Angiosperm Phylogeny Group (2013) Key: C3 – C3 carbon fixation; C4 – C4 carbon fixation

The Angiosperm Phylogeny Group (APG) is an informal international group of systematic botanists who collaborate to establish a consensus on the taxonomy of flowering plants (angiosperms) that reflects new knowledge about plant relationships discovered through phylogenetic studies.

As of 2026, five incremental versions of a classification system have resulted from this collaboration, published in 1998, 2003, 2009, 2016 and 2026. An important motivation for the group was what they considered deficiencies in prior angiosperm classifications since they were not based on monophyletic groups (i.e., groups that include all the descendants of a common ancestor).

APG publications are increasingly influential, with a number of major herbaria changing the arrangement of their collections to match the latest APG system.

== Angiosperm classification and the APG ==
In the past, classification systems were typically produced by an individual botanist or by a small group. The result was a large number of systems (see List of systems of plant taxonomy). Different systems and their updates were generally favoured in different countries. Examples are the Engler system in continental Europe, the Bentham & Hooker system in Britain (particularly influential because it was used by Kew), the Takhtajan system in the former Soviet Union and countries within its sphere of influence and the Cronquist system in the United States.

Before the availability of genetic evidence, the classification of angiosperms (also known as flowering plants, Angiospermae, Anthophyta or Magnoliophyta) was based on their morphology (particularly of their flower) and biochemistry (the kinds of chemical compounds in the plant).

After the 1980s, detailed genetic evidence analysed by phylogenetic methods became available and while confirming or clarifying some relationships in existing classification systems, it radically changed others. This genetic evidence created a rapid increase in knowledge that led to many proposed changes; stability was "rudely shattered". This posed problems for all users of classification systems (including encyclopaedists). The impetus came from a major molecular study published in 1993 based on 5000 flowering plants and a photosynthesis gene (rbcL). This produced a number of surprising results in terms of the relationships between groupings of plants, for instance the dicotyledons were not supported as a distinct group. At first there was a reluctance to develop a new system based entirely on a single gene. However, subsequent work continued to support these findings. These research studies involved an unprecedented collaboration between a very large number of scientists. Therefore, rather than naming all the individual contributors a decision was made to adopt the name Angiosperm Phylogeny Group classification, or APG for short. The first publication under this name was in 1998, and attracted considerable media attention. The intention was to provide a widely accepted and more stable point of reference for angiosperm classification.

As of 2016, three revisions have been published, in 2003 (APG II), in 2009 (APG III) and in 2016 (APG IV), each superseding the previous system. Thirteen researchers have been listed as authors to the three papers, and a further 43 as contributors (see Members of the APG below).

A classification presents a view at a particular point in time, based on a particular state of research. Independent researchers, including members of the APG, continue to publish their own views on areas of angiosperm taxonomy. Classifications change, however inconvenient this is to users. However, the APG publications are increasingly regarded as an authoritative point of reference and the following are some examples of the influence of the APG system:

- A significant number of major herbaria, including Kew, are changing the order of their collections in accordance with APG.
- The influential World Checklist of Selected Plant Families (also from Kew) is being updated to the APG III system.
- In the United States in 2006, a photographic survey of the plants of the US and Canada is organized according to the APG II system.
- In the UK, the 2010 edition of the standard flora of the British Isles (by Stace) is based on the APG III system. The previous editions were based on the Cronquist system.

== Principles of the APG system ==
The principles of the APG's approach to classification were set out in the first paper of 1998, and have remained unchanged in subsequent revisions. Briefly, these are:

- The Linnean system of orders and families should be retained. "The family is central in flowering plant systematics." An ordinal classification of families is proposed as a "reference tool of broad utility". Orders are considered to be of particular value in teaching and in studying family relationships.
- Groups should be monophyletic (i.e. consist of all descendants of a common ancestor). The main reason why existing systems are rejected is because they do not have this property, they are not phylogenetic.
- A broad approach is taken to defining the limits of groups such as orders and families. Thus of orders, it is said that a limited number of larger orders will be more useful. Families containing only a single genus and orders containing only a single family are avoided where this is possible without violating the over-riding requirement for monophyly.
- Above or parallel to the level of orders and families, the term clades is used more freely. (Some clades have later been given formal names in a paper associated with the 2009 revision of the APG system.) The authors say that it is "not possible, nor is it desirable" to name all clades in a phylogenetic tree; however, systematists need to agree on names for some clades, particularly orders and families, to facilitate communication and discussion.

For a detailed discussion on phylogenetic nomenclature, see Cantino et al. (2007).)

== APG I (1998) ==
The initial 1998 paper by the APG made angiosperms the first large group of organisms to be systematically re-classified primarily on the basis of genetic characteristics. The paper explained the authors' view that there is a need for a classification system for angiosperms at the level of families, orders and above, but that existing classifications were "outdated". The main reason why existing systems were rejected was because they were not phylogenetic, i.e. not based on strictly monophyletic groups (groups which consist of all descendants of a common ancestor). An ordinal classification of flowering plant families was proposed as a "reference tool of broad utility". The broad approach adopted to defining the limits of orders resulted in the recognition of 40 orders, compared to, for example, 232 in Takhtajan's 1997 classification.

In 1998 only a handful of families had been adequately studied, but the primary aim was to obtain a consensus on the naming of higher orders. Such a consensus proved relatively easy to achieve but the resultant tree was highly unresolved. That is, while the relationship of orders was established, their composition was not.

Other features of the proposed classification included:

- Formal, scientific names are not used above the level of order, named clades being used instead. Thus eudicots and monocots are not given a formal rank on the grounds that "it is not yet clear at which level they should be recognized".
- A substantial number of taxa whose classification had traditionally been uncertain are given places, although there still remain 25 families of "uncertain position".
- Alternative classifications are provided for some groups, in which a number of families can either be regarded as separate or can be merged into a single larger family. For example, the Fumariaceae can either be treated as a separate family or as part of Papaveraceae.

A major outcome of the classification was the disappearance of the traditional division of the flowering plants into two groups, monocots and dicots. The monocots were recognized as a clade, but the dicots were not, with a number of former dicots being placed in separate groups basal to both monocots and the remaining dicots, the eudicots or 'true dicots'. The overall scheme was relatively simple. This consisted of a grade consisting of isolated taxa (referred to as ANITA), followed by the major angiosperm radiation, clades of monocots, magnolids and eudicots. The last being a large clade with smaller subclades and two main groupings, rosids and asterids, each in turn having two major subclades.

== APG II (2003) ==
As the overall relationship between groups of flowering plants became clearer, the focus shifted to the family level, in particular those families generally accepted as problematic. Again, consensus was achieved relatively easily resulting in an updated classification at the family level. The second paper published by the APG in 2003 presented an update to the original classification of 1998. The authors stated that changes were proposed only when there was "substantial new evidence" which supported them.

The classification continued the tradition of seeking broad circumscriptions of taxa, for example trying to place small families containing only one genus in a larger group. The authors stated that they have generally accepted the views of specialists, although noting that specialists "nearly always favour splitting of groups" regarded as too varied in their morphology.

APG II continued and indeed extends the use of alternative 'bracketed' taxa allowing the choice of either a large family or a number of smaller ones. For example, the large family Asparagaceae includes seven 'bracketed' families which can either be considered as part of the Asparagaceae or as separate families. Some of the main changes in APG II were:

- New orders are proposed, particularly to accommodate the 'basal clades' left as families in the first system.
- Many of the previously unplaced families are now located within the system.
- Several major families are re-structured.

In 2007, a paper was published giving a linear ordering of the families in APG II, suitable for ordering herbarium specimens, for example.

== APG III (2009) ==
The third paper from the APG updates the system described in the 2003 paper. The broad outline of the system remains unchanged, but the number of previously unplaced families and genera is significantly reduced. This requires the recognition of both new orders and new families compared to the previous classification. The number of orders goes up from 45 to 59; only 10 families are not placed in an order and only two of these (Apodanthaceae and Cynomoriaceae) are left entirely outside the classification. The authors say that they have tried to leave long-recognized families unchanged, while merging families with few genera. They "hope the classification [...] will not need much further change."

A major change is that the paper discontinues the use of 'bracketed' families in favour of larger, more inclusive families. As a result, the APG III system contains only 415 families, rather than the 457 of APG II. For example, the agave family (Agavaceae) and the hyacinth family (Hyacinthaceae) are no longer regarded as distinct from the broader asparagus family (Asparagaceae). The authors say that alternative circumscriptions, as in APG I and II, are likely to cause confusion and that major herbaria which are re-arranging their collections in accordance with the APG approach have all agreed to use the more inclusive families. This approach is being increasingly used in collections in herbaria and botanic gardens.

In the same volume of the journal, two related papers were published. One gives a linear ordering of the families in APG III; as with the linear ordering published for APG II, this is intended for ordering herbarium specimens, for example. The other paper gives, for the first time, a classification of the families in APG III which uses formal taxonomic ranks; previously only informal clade names were used above the ordinal level.

== APG IV (2016) ==
In the development of a fourth version there was some controversy over the methodology, and the development of a consensus proved more difficult than in previous iterations. In particular Peter Stevens questioned the validity of discussions regarding family delimitation in the absence of changes of phylogenetic relationships.

Further progress was made by the use of large banks of genes, including those of plastid, mitochondrial and nuclear ribosomal origin, such as that of Douglas Soltis and colleagues (2011). The fourth version was finally published in 2016. It arose from an international conference hosted at the Royal Botanical Gardens in September 2015 and also an online survey of botanists and other users. The broad outline of the system remains unchanged but several new orders are included (Boraginales, Dilleniales, Icacinales, Metteniusales and Vahliales), some new families are recognised (Kewaceae, Macarthuriaceae, Maundiaceae, Mazaceae, Microteaceae, Nyssaceae, Peraceae, Petenaeaceae and Petiveriaceae) and some previously recognised families are lumped (Aristolochiaceae now includes Lactoridaceae and Hydnoraceae; Restionaceae now re-includes Anarthriaceae and Centrolepidaceae; and Buxaceae now includes Haptanthaceae). Due to nomenclatural issues, the family name Asphodelaceae is used instead of Xanthorrhoeaceae, and Francoaceae is used instead of Melianthaceae (and now also includes Vivianiaceae). This brings the total number of orders and families recognized in the APG system to 64 and 416, respectively. Two additional informal major clades, superrosids and superasterids, that each comprise the additional orders that are included in the larger clades dominated by the rosids and asterids are also included. APG IV also uses the linear approach (LAPG) as advocated by Haston et al. (2009) In a supplemental file Byng et al. provide an alphabetical list of families by orders.

== APG V (2026) ==
The fifth version is marked by greater reliance on nuclear genes. The ten-year expansion of molecular data sets has contributed to a clearer resolution of certain parts of the angiosperm tree. Two new orders are recognized: Oncothecales and Cardiopteridales (including Cardiopteridaceae and Stemonuraceae). The fabids have been restricted to merely four orders, all nitrogen-fixing, with the former "COM clade" now being understood as a polyphyletic assemblage within the malvids.

== Updates ==
Peter Stevens, one of the authors of all four of the APG papers, maintains a web site, the Angiosperm Phylogeny Website (APWeb), hosted by the Missouri Botanical Garden, which has been regularly updated since 2001, and is a useful source for the latest research in angiosperm phylogeny which follows the APG approach. Other sources include the Angiosperm Phylogeny Poster and The Flowering Plants Handbook.

== Members of the APG ==
Name	APG I	APG II	APG III	APG IV	Institutional affiliation
Birgitta Bremer	c	a	a		Swedish Academy of Sciences
Kåre Bremer	a	a	a		Uppsala University; Stockholm University
James W. Byng				a	Plant Gateway; University of Aberdeen
Mark Wayne Chase	a	a	a	a	Royal Botanic Gardens, Kew
Maarten J.M. Christenhusz				a	Plant Gateway; Royal Botanic Gardens, Kew
Michael F. Fay	c	c	a	a	Royal Botanic Gardens, Kew
Walter S. Judd				a	University of Florida
David J. Mabberley				a	University of Oxford; Universiteit Leiden; Naturalis Biodiversity Center; Macquarie University; National Herbarium of New South Wales
James L. Reveal		a	a		University of Maryland; Cornell University
Alexander N. Sennikov				a	Finnish Museum of Natural History; Komarov Botanical Institute
Douglas E. Soltis	c	a	a	a	University of Florida
Pamela S. Soltis	c	a	a	a	Florida Museum of Natural History
Peter F. Stevens	a	a	a	a	Harvard University Herbaria; University of Missouri-St. Louis and Missouri Botanical Garden

a = listed as an author; c = listed as a contributor

== Bibliography ==
- Cantino, Philip D.; Doyle, James A.; Graham, Sean W.; Judd, Walter S.; Olmstead, Richard G.; Soltis, Douglas E.; Soltis, Pamela S.; Donoghue, Michael J. (2007), "Towards a phylogenetic nomenclature of Tracheophyta", Taxon, 56 (3): E1–E44, doi:10.2307/25065865, JSTOR 25065865
- Byng, James W. (16 October 2014), The Flowering Plants Handbook, Plant Gateway, doi:10.13140/2.1.1849.8566
- Chase, Mark W.; Soltis, Douglas E.; Olmstead, Richard G.; Morgan, David; Les, Donald H.; Mishler, Brent D.; Duvall, Melvin R.; Price, Robert A.; Hills, Harold G.; Qiu, Yin-Long; Kron, Kathleen A.; Rettig, Jeffrey H.; Conti, Elena; Palmer, Jeffrey D.; Manhart, James R.; Sytsma, Kenneth J.; Michaels, Helen J.; Kress, W. John; Karol, Kenneth G.; Clark, W. Dennis; Hedren, Mikael; Gaut, Brandon S.; Jansen, Robert K.; Kim, Ki-Joong; Wimpee, Charles F.; Smith, James F.; Furnier, Glenn R.; Strauss, Steven H.; Xiang, Qui-Yun; Plunkett, Gregory M.; Soltis, Pamela S.; Swensen, Susan M.; Williams, Stephen E.; Gadek, Paul A.; Quinn, Christopher J.; Eguiarte, Luis E.; Golenberg, Edward; Learn, Gerald H.; Graham, Sean W.; Barrett, Spencer C. H.; Dayanandan, Selvadurai; Albert, Victor A. (1993), "Phylogenetics of Seed Plants: An Analysis of Nucleotide Sequences from the Plastid Gene rbcL" (PDF), Annals of the Missouri Botanical Garden, 80 (3): 528, Bibcode:1993AnMBG..80..528C, doi:10.2307/2399846, JSTOR 2399846
- Chase, M.W.; Reveal, J.L. & Fay, M.F. (2009), "A subfamilial classification for the expanded asparagalean families Amaryllidaceae, Asparagaceae and Xanthorrhoeaceae", Botanical Journal of the Linnean Society, 161 (2): 132–136, doi:10.1111/j.1095-8339.2009.00999.x
- Soltis, D.E.; Soltis, P.S.; Endress, P.K. & Chase, M.W. (2005), Phylogeny and Evolution of Angiosperms, Sunderland, Massachusetts: Sinauer, ISBN 978-0-87893-817-9
- Stace, Clive (2010), New Flora of the British Isles (3rd ed.), Cambridge, UK: Cambridge University Press, ISBN 9781139486491
- Maiti, Gaurgopal & Mukherjee, Sobhan Kr., eds. (2012), Multidisciplinary approaches in angiosperm systematics: XVIIIth Annual Conference of IAAT and International Seminar on 'Multidisciplinary Approaches in Angiosperm Systematics', held in the Department of Botany, University of Kalyani, Kalyani, Nadia, Kalyani, West Bengal: University of Kalyani, ISBN 978-93-5067-867-1
- Soltis, D. E.; Smith, S. A.; Cellinese, N.; Wurdack, K. J.; Tank, D. C.; Brockington, S. F.; Refulio-Rodriguez, N. F.; Walker, J. B.; Moore, M. J.; Carlsward, B. S.; Bell, C. D.; Latvis, M.; Crawley, S.; Black, C.; Diouf, D.; Xi, Z.; Rushworth, C. A.; Gitzendanner, M. A.; Sytsma, K. J.; Qiu, Y.-L.; Hilu, K. W.; Davis, C. C.; Sanderson, M. J.; Beaman, R. S.; Olmstead, R. G.; Judd, W. S.; Donoghue, M. J.; Soltis, P. S. (8 April 2011). "Angiosperm phylogeny: 17 genes, 640 taxa". American Journal of Botany. 98 (4): 704–730. Bibcode:2011AmJB...98..704S. doi:10.3732/ajb.1000404. hdl:2027.42/142064. PMID 21613169.
- Wearn, James A.; Chase, Mark W.; Mabberley, David J.; Couch, Charlotte (June 2013), "Utilizing a phylogenetic plant classification for systematic arrangements in botanic gardens and herbaria", Botanical Journal of the Linnean Society, 172 (2): 127–141, doi:10.1111/boj.12031
- World Checklist of Selected Plant Families, Royal Botanic Gardens, Kew

=== APG ===
- Bhattacharyya, P.K. & Bhattacharyya, Kaustuv, "Comparison of the Angiosperm Phylogeny Group classification (2009) with that of the system of Takhtajan (2009) and a note on the Chase and Reveal (2009), Haston et al. (2009), and Mabberley (2008)", in Maiti & Mukherjee (2012), pp. 13–24
- Byng, James W; Chase, Mark; Christenhusz, Maarten; Stevens, Peter (2016). "Angiosperm phylogeny classification of flowering plants (APG IV) with the families organized alphabetically within orders". Botanical Journal of the Linnean Society. 181.
- Chase, Mark W. & Reveal, James L. (2009), "A phylogenetic classification of the land plants to accompany APG III", Botanical Journal of the Linnean Society, 161 (2): 122–127, doi:10.1111/j.1095-8339.2009.01002.x
- Christenhusz, Maarten J.M.; Vorontsova, Maria S.; Fay, Michael F. & Chase, Mark W. (August 2015), "Results from an online survey of family delimitation in angiosperms and ferns: recommendations to the Angiosperm Phylogeny Group for thorny problems in plant classification", Botanical Journal of the Linnean Society, 178 (4): 501–528, doi:10.1111/boj.12285
- Haston, Elspeth; Richardson, James E.; Stevens, Peter F.; Chase, Mark W. & Harris, D.J. (2009), "The Linear Angiosperm Phylogeny Group (LAPG) III: a linear sequence of the families in APG III", Botanical Journal of the Linnean Society, 161 (2): 128–131, doi:10.1111/j.1095-8339.2009.01000.x
- Reveal, J.L.; Chase, M.W. (2011). "APG III: Bibliographical Information and Synonymy of Magnoliidae" (PDF). Phytotaxa. 19 (1): 71–134. Bibcode:2011Phytx..19...71R. doi:10.11646/phytotaxa.19.1.4.
- Haston, E.; Richardson, J.E.; Stevens, P.F.; Chase, M.W. & Harris, D.J. (2007), "A linear sequence of Angiosperm Phylogeny Group II families", Taxon, 56 (1): 7–12, Bibcode:2007Taxon..56....7H, doi:10.2307/25065731, JSTOR 25065731
- Haston, Elspeth; Richardson, James E.; Stevens, Peter F.; Chase, Mark W.; Harris, David J. (2009). "The Linear Angiosperm Phylogeny Group (LAPG) III: a linear sequence of the families in APG III". Botanical Journal of the Linnean Society. 161 (2): 128–131. doi:10.1111/j.1095-8339.2009.01000.x.
- Spears, Priscilla (2006), A tour of the flowering plants based on the classification system of the Angiosperm phylogeny group, St. Louis, Mo.: Missouri Botanical Garden Press, ISBN 978-1-930723-48-1
- Stevens, P.F. (2015) [1st. Pub. 2001], Angiosperm Phylogeny Website
- Cole, Theodor C.H. (2015), "Angiosperm Phylogeny Group (APG) in jeopardy – Where have the flowers gone?", PeerJ PrePrints: 3:e1517, doi:10.7287/peerj.preprints.1238v1
- Cole, Theodor C. H.; Hilger, Hartmut H.; Stevens, Peter F. (May 2019), Angiosperm Phylogeny: Flowering Plant Systematics, doi:10.7287/peerj.preprints.2320v6
- Fay, Michael (9 May 2016). "APG - classification by consensus". Royal Botanic Gardens Kew.
- "As easy as APG III - Scientists revise the system of classifying flowering plants", Kew News, Royal Botanic Gardens, Kew, 22 October 2009, archived from the original on 4 October 2015

APG I-IV (1998–2016)

- Angiosperm Phylogeny Group (1998), "An ordinal classification for the families of flowering plants", Annals of the Missouri Botanical Garden, 85 (4): 531–553, Bibcode:1998AnMBG..85..531., doi:10.2307/2992015, JSTOR 2992015
- Angiosperm Phylogeny Group II (2003), "An update of the Angiosperm Phylogeny Group classification for the orders and families of flowering plants: APG II" (PDF), Botanical Journal of the Linnean Society, 141 (4), Bremer, B., K. Bremer, M.W. Chase, J.L. Reveal, D.E. Soltis, P.S. Soltis & P.F. Stevens: 399–436, doi:10.1046/j.1095-8339.2003.t01-1-00158.x, archived from the original (PDF) on 2020-10-22
- Angiosperm Phylogeny Group III (2009), "An update of the Angiosperm Phylogeny Group classification for the orders and families of flowering plants: APG III", Botanical Journal of the Linnean Society, 161 (2), Bremer, B., K. Bremer, M.W. Chase, M.F. Fay, J.L. Reveal, D.E. Soltis, P.S. Soltis & P.F. Stevens: 105–121, doi:10.1111/j.1095-8339.2009.00996.x, hdl:10654/18083
- Angiosperm Phylogeny Group IV (2016). "An update of the Angiosperm Phylogeny Group classification for the orders and families of flowering plants: APG IV". Botanical Journal of the Linnean Society. 181 (1): 1–20. doi:10.1111/boj.12385.
