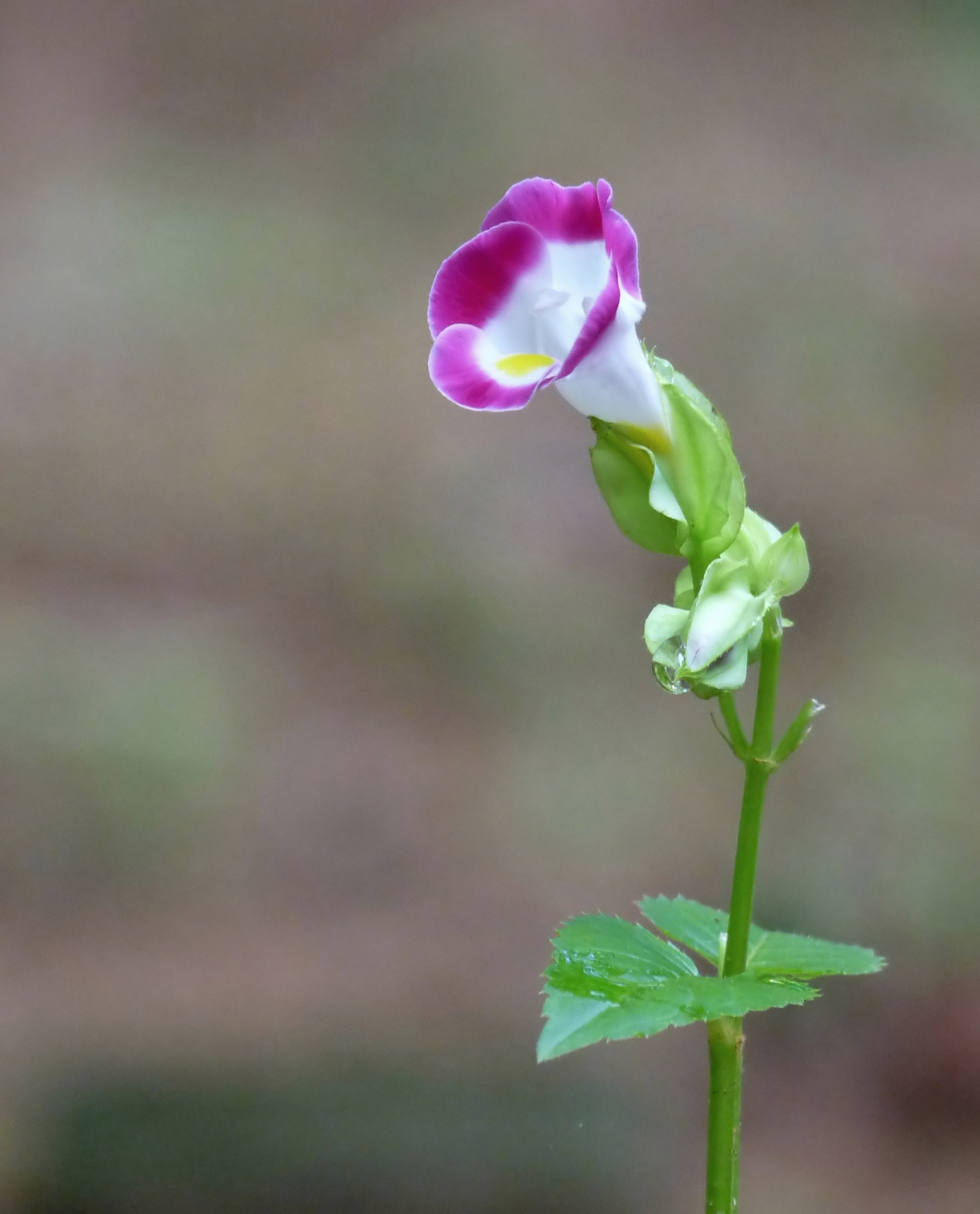
- Torenia fournieri

Scientific classification
- Kingdom: Plantae
- Clade: Tracheophytes
- Clade: Angiosperms
- Clade: Eudicots
- Clade: Core eudicots
- Clade: Superasterids

Clades
- Berberidopsidales; Santalales; Caryophyllales; Asterids Cornales Ericales Euasterids Lamiids Campanulids

= Superasterids =

Superasterids Temporal range: Late Cretaceous–recent

Clade of flowering plants

The superasterids are members of a large clade (monophyletic group) of flowering plants, containing more than 122,000 species.

The clade is divided into 20 orders as defined in APG IV system. These orders, in turn, together comprise about 146 families.

The name is based upon the name "Asteridae", which had usually been understood to be a subclass.

== Relationships ==
The asterids, Berberidopsidales, Santalales, and Caryophyllales form the superasterids clade. This is one of three groups that compose the Pentapetalae (core eudicots minus Gunnerales), the others being Dilleniales and the superrosids (Saxifragales and rosids).

== Phylogeny ==
The phylogeny of superasterids shown below is adapted from the Angiosperm Phylogeny Group website.

- superasterids
  - Berberidopsidales
  - Santalales
  - Caryophyllales
  - asterids
    - Cornales
    - - Ericales
      - euasterids
        - campanulids
          - Aquifoliales
          - - Asterales
            - Escalloniales
            - - Bruniales
              - - Apiales
                - - Dipsacales
                  - Paracryphiales
        - lamiids
          - Icacinales
          - - Metteniusales
            - - Garryales
              - - Boraginales
                - Gentianales
                - Vahliales
                - Lamiales
                - Solanales
