= GRP RNA motif =

Element of RNA-binding protein genes

The GRP RNA motif is a conserved RNA structural element identified in introns of glycine-rich RNA-binding protein genes, including GRP7 and GRP8. It is associated with alternative splicing and nonsense-mediated decay (NMD). GRP RNA motif has been reported as a cis-regulatory element, that modulates binding of GRP7 and GRP8 proteins to their RNA targets.

== Structure ==
The motif is predicted to form a stem-loop structure of approximately 20 base pairs. An alternative 5′ splice site is located near the base of the stem, suggesting that RNA structure may influence splice-site accessibility.

== GRP proteins function ==
In Arabidopsis thaliana (At), AtGRP7 and AtGRP8 are circadian clock-regulated RNA-binding proteins that form an interlocked auto-regulatory and cross-regulatory feedback network based on alternative splicing and NMD of their own pre-mRNAs, contributing to circadian output regulation, were transcript levels oscillate with a daily rhythm. GRP7 and GRP8 are also involved in regulating flowering time.

== Distribution ==
Homologous motifs of GRP RNA motif have been identified in multiple plant species within the Pentapetalae clade.
