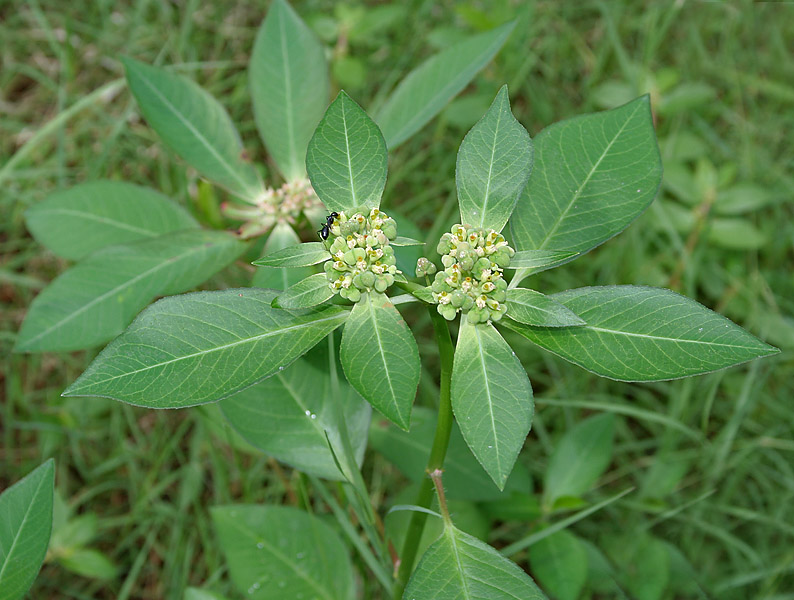
- Euphorbia heterophylla

Scientific classification
- Kingdom: Plantae
- Clade: Tracheophytes
- Clade: Angiosperms
- Clade: Eudicots
- Clade: Core eudicots
- Clade: Superrosids

Clades
- Saxifragales; Rosids Vitales Eurosids Fabids Malvids

= Superrosids =

Superrosids Temporal range: Late Cretaceous–recent

Clade of flowering plants

The superrosids are members of a large clade (monophyletic group) of flowering plants, containing more than 88,000 species, and thus more than a quarter of all angiosperms.

The clade is divided into 18 orders as defined in APG IV system. These orders, in turn, together comprise about 155 families.

The name is based upon the name "Rosidae", which had usually been understood to be a subclass.

== Relationships ==
The rosids and Saxifragales form the superrosids clade. This is one of three groups that compose the Pentapetalae (core eudicots minus Gunnerales), the others being Dilleniales and the superasterids (Berberidopsidales, Caryophyllales, Santalales, and asterids).

== Phylogeny ==
The phylogeny of superrosids shown below is adapted from the Angiosperm Phylogeny Group website.

- Saxifragales
- rosids
  - Vitales
  - eurosids
    - fabids
      - Zygophyllales
      - - COM clade
          - Celastrales
          - - Malpighiales
            - Oxalidales
        - nitrogen‑fixing clade
          - Fabales
          - - Rosales
            - - Fagales
              - Cucurbitales
    - malvids
      - - Geraniales
        - Myrtales
      - - Crossosomatales
        - - Picramniales
          - - Sapindales
            - - Huerteales
              - - Brassicales
                - Malvales
