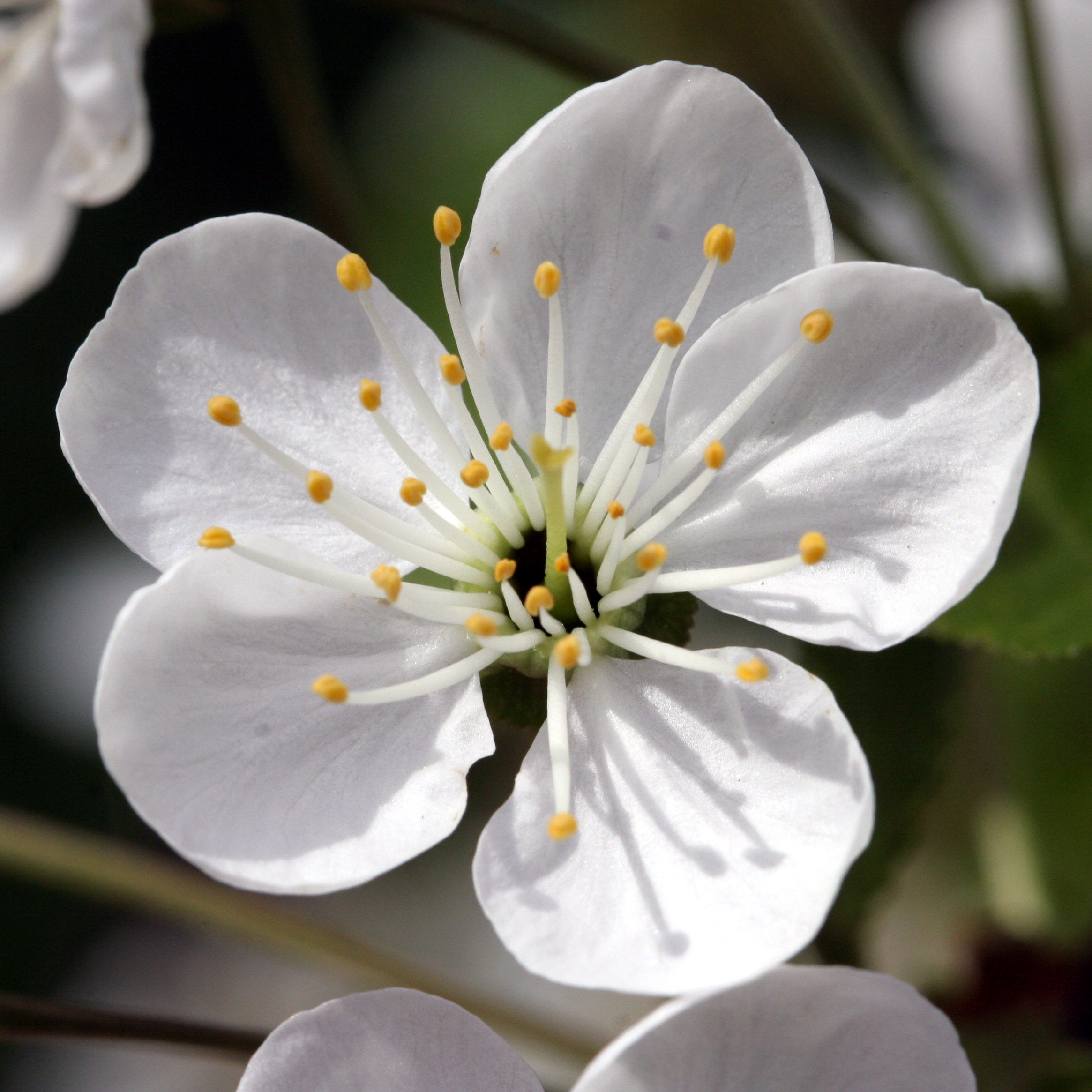
- Cerasus (Rosaceae)

Scientific classification
- Kingdom: Plantae
- Clade: Tracheophytes
- Clade: Angiosperms
- Clade: Eudicots
- Clade: Gunneridae
- Clade: Pentapetalae; DE Soltis, PS Soltis & WS Judd 2007

Clades and orders
- Dilleniales Bercht. & J.Presl; Saxifragales Bercht. & J.Presl; Berberidopsidales Doweld; Santalales R.Br. ex Bercht. & J.Presl; Caryophyllales Juss. ex Bercht. & J.Presl; Rosids; Asterids

= Pentapetalae =

Group of eudicots known as core eudicots

In phylogenetic nomenclature, the Pentapetalae are a large group of eudicots that were informally referred to as the "core eudicots" in some papers on angiosperm phylogenetics. They comprise an extremely large and diverse group accounting for about 65% of the species richness of the angiosperms, with wide variability in habit, morphology, chemistry, geographic distribution, and other attributes. Classical systematics, based solely on morphological information, was not able to recognize this group. In fact, the circumscription of the Pentapetalae as a clade is based on strong evidence obtained from DNA molecular analysis data.

The Pentapetalae clade is composed of the orders Berberidopsidales—including the family Aextoxicaceae—Caryophyllales, Santalales and Saxifragales, the families Dilleniaceae and Vitaceae and all members of the clades Asteridae and Rosidae.

Phylogenetic analyses of complete chloroplast genome sequences have provided a reliable outline of the relationships among the major Pentapetalae lineages and also provide a framework for investigating the evolutionary processes that generated a large proportion of the diversity of extant angiosperms. In light of these phylogenetic results, the current challenge for scientists in this area of botany is to identify the characters that are unique to the superasterid and superrosid clades and those that arose in parallel in both, and then to explore their evolutionary implications.

== Description ==
Pentapetalae have a characteristic type of flower made up of whorls of five pieces, as the name of the clade suggests (from Ancient Greek, penta meaning five). The perianth is composed of a differentiated calyx and corolla. The sepals are innervated by three or more vascular bundles corresponding to the vascular system of the petiole, while the petals have only one trace. The androecium usually has twice as many pieces as the calyx and corona, i.e. is composed of 10 stamens, which are arranged in two whorls. When the number of stamens is greater than twice the number of pieces of the perianth, they are arranged in fascicles or in a centrifugal spiral.

Not all plants with five petals belong to Pentapetalae though. For example, several members of the family Ranunculaceae in the order Ranunculales. Gunnerales, not Ranunculales, is the sister clade to Pentapetalae, so the shared petal number between Pentapetalae and Ranunculaceae is likely the result of convergent evolution.

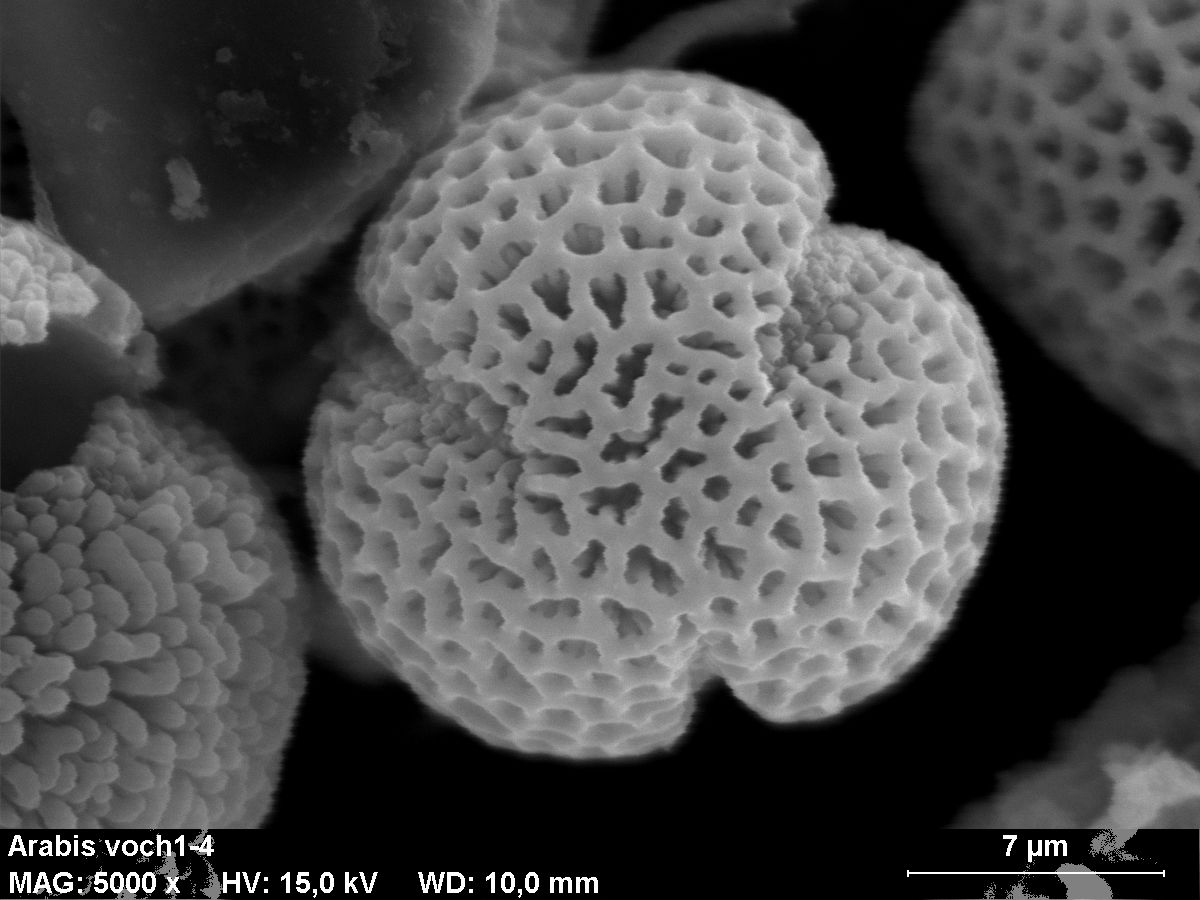
Scanning electron microscope image of a tricolpate pollen grain in Arabis

Pollen grains in the Pentapetalae are characteristically tricolpate. This type of pollen grain has three or more pores within grooves called "colpos". In contrast, most other spermatophytes—that is, gymnosperms, monocots and paleodicots—have monoculcate pollen, with a single pore located in a groove called a "sulcus".

The gynoecium of Pentapetalae plants is usually composed of five carpels joined, although gynoeciums formed by three carpels are also quite common. In cases where the gynoecium is composed of only two carpels, they overlap. In general, they present "compitum", a region of the style where the stylar canals of the different carpels are united in a single cavity and in which the pollen tubes can change direction of growth from one carpel to another. The ovules are usually of axillary placentation. The pistil, finally, commonly terminates in a style and a stigma that is not decurrent. The fruit is dry and dehiscent, when it is a capsule it shows loculicidal dehiscence. Regarding the interaction between pollen and pistil, pentapetalous plants have a gametophytic incompatibility system based on the RNAase system. Another anatomical characteristic of Pentapetalae is the presence of a closed root apical meristem. From the phytochemical point of view, this group of plants present cyanogenesis—that is, they biosynthesize cyanogenetic glycosides that by hydrolysis originate cyanide—through the metabolic pathway of branched amino acids, such as leucine, isoleucine and valine.

== Diversity ==
=== Dilleniales ===
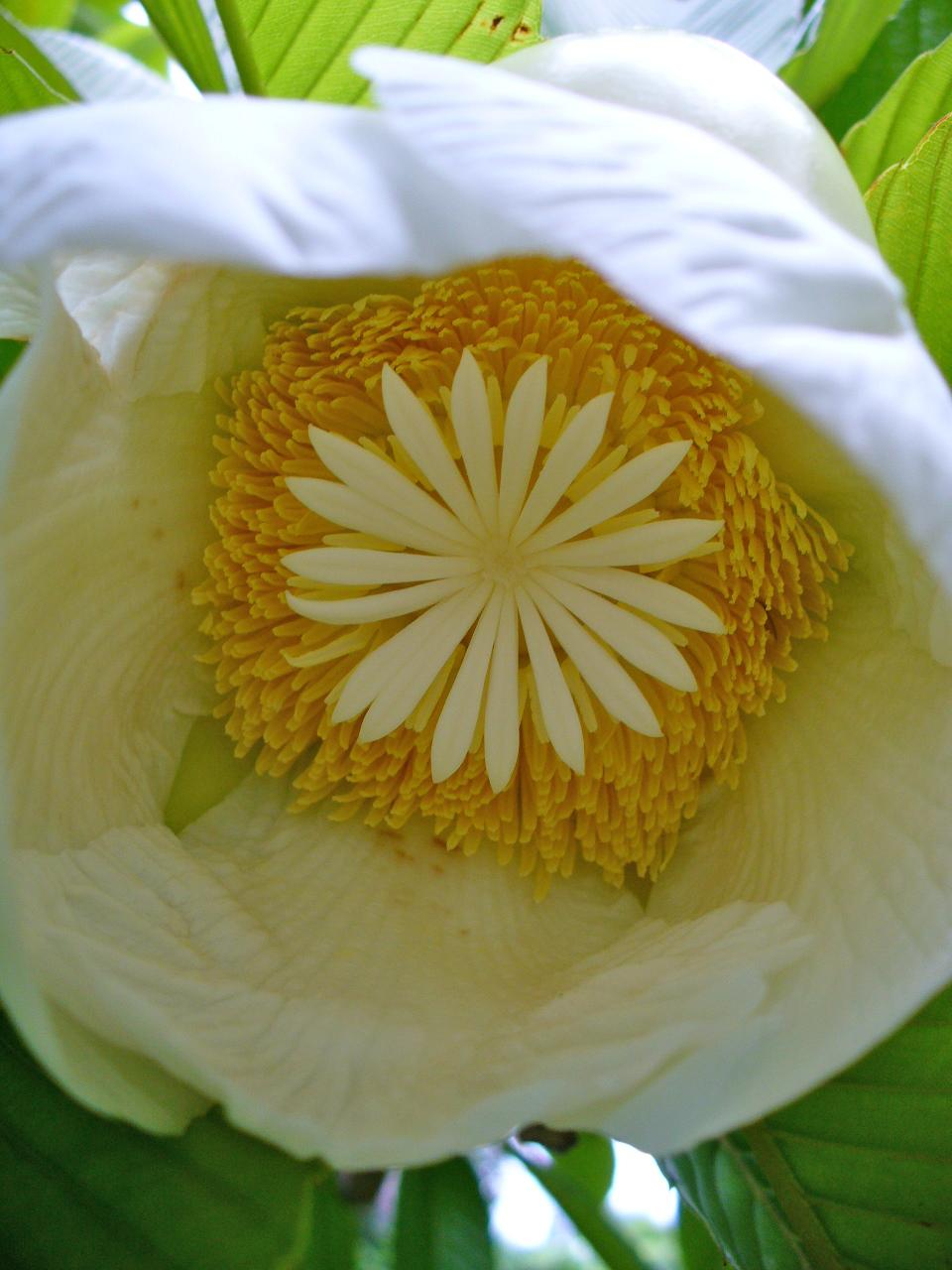
Flower of Dillenia indica.

Dilleniales are recognized by their leaves with usually strong and parallel secondary veins that go straight to the teeth; being common the tertiary scalariform venation. The leaf lamina is usually rough. Also, the leaves tend to elongate when still rolled. The wood is usually vivid brown. The peduncles are jointed near the apex and persist after the flower falls off; the flowers are usually conspicuous, with ruffled petals and numerous stamens that are reflexed in the bud, usually having porous anthers. The fruits are small follicles containing seeds with aril, the calyx is persistent, sometimes acrescent, and the filaments are also persistent.

=== Berberidopsidales ===
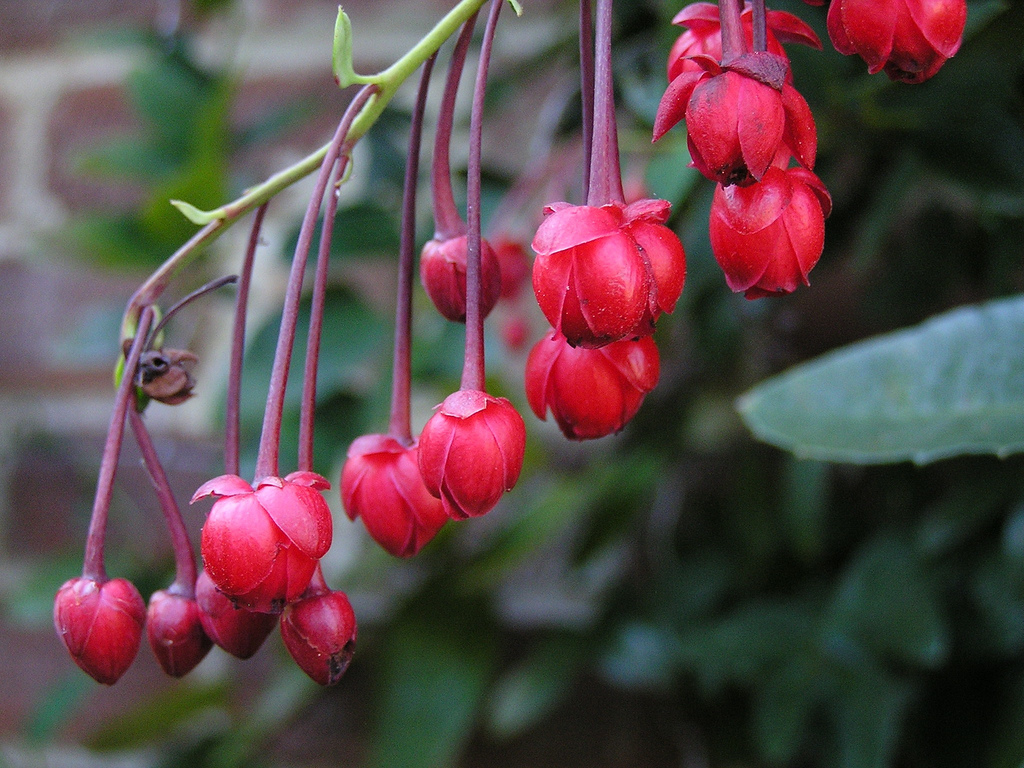
Flowers of Berberidopsis corallina

Berberidopsidales is an order formally accepted only in the most recent phylogenetic classifications of angiosperms, comprising two small families, Aextoxicaceae and Berberidopsidaceae, which together include only three genera and four species distributed in Chile and eastern Australia. The distinctive characters of the order are largely related to its anatomy, such as the presence of crystals—especially drusen—in the leaves and petioles, the vascular bundles of the petiole form a ring and the stoma of the leaf epidermis are of a particular type called "cyclocytic". The androecium has stamens with rigid filament and the seeds present endotesta.

The flowers of Berberidopsis corallina do not differ in sepals and petals, but exhibit a gradual transition from small outer tepals to larger, brightly colored inner tepals. The androcecium consists of a ring of stamens and there are three carpels with parietal placentation. In contrast, Aextoxicon has unisexual and pentamerous flowers. Male flowers have a distinct calyx and corona and a haplostomous androcecium. Female flowers have the same type of perianth, but the number of pieces is more variable.

Given these differences between the two genera belonging to the same family, it has been suggested that the floral development of Berberidopsidales is a "link" in the evolution of the Gunneridae flower, and that the floral morphology of Aextoxicon, with features such as the highly variable number of sepals and spirally arranged petals, is also compatible with this hypothesis. However, the position of the Berberidopsidales in the phylogenetic tree is not congruent with it.

=== Santalales ===
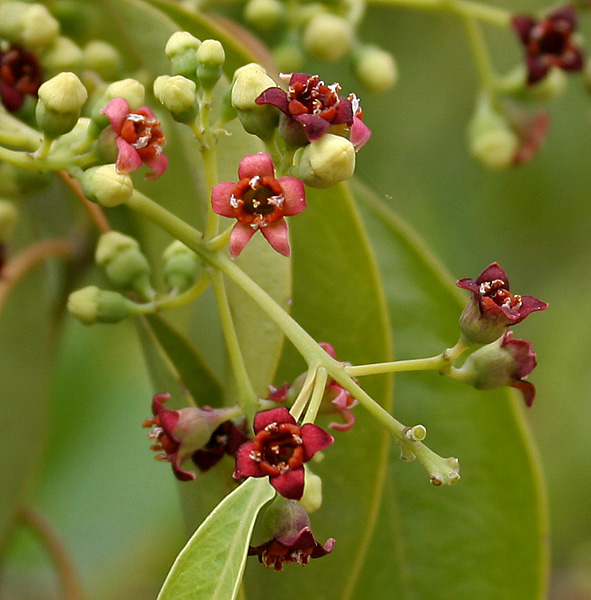
Flowers of Santalum album

The order Santalales, with its approximately 160 genera and 2,200 species distributed worldwide, is a monophyletic group that has long occupied an unresolved position at the base of the Gunneridae. Recently, phylogenetic studies based on molecular data from the complete chloroplast genome indicate a position of Santalales at the base of the Asterids. Santalales is ecologically diverse and includes free-living plants, such as Erythropalum, as well as (hemi)parasites. Among the latter are species that parasitize stems or shoots, such as the mistletoes of the genus Misodendrum, and root parasites, including the well-known and economically important sandalwood tree (Santalum album), whose aromatic wood is a component of many perfumes. The APG III classification system recognized seven families in Santalales: Balanophoraceae, Misodendraceae, Opiliaceae, Schoepfiaceae, Loranthaceae, Santalaceae (including Viscaceae), and Olacaceae. In 2010, however, new molecular data have made it possible to revise that conclusion, so that Aptandraceae, Balanophoraceae, Coulaceae, Erythropalaceae, Loranthaceae, Misodendraceae, Octonemaceae, Olacaceae, Opiliaceae, Santalaceae, Schoepfiaceae, Strombosiaceae, and Ximeniaceae are now recognized.

=== Rosids ===
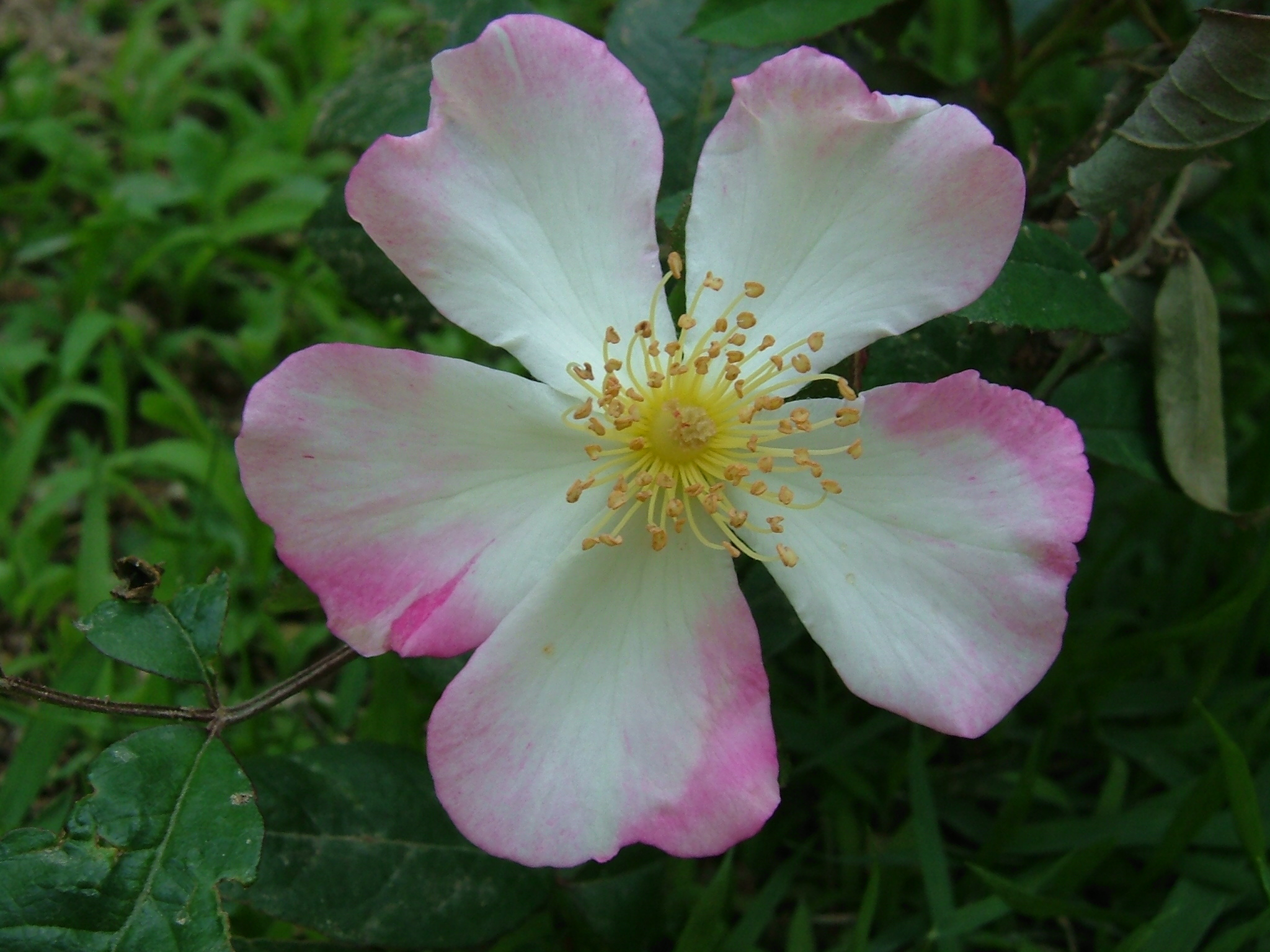
Rose uchiyamane flower.

The rosids are a large group of eudicotyledons containing approximately 70 000 species, more than a quarter of the total number of angiosperm species. It has been subdivided into some 16 to 20 orders, depending on the circumscription and classification adopted. These orders, in turn, comprise about 140 families. Together with the asterids, they constitute the two largest groups of eudicotyledons.

The rosids share a few morphological characteristics that distinguish them from other groups, such as the presence of nectaries in the floral receptacle, the long embryo and the distinctive mucilaginous cells. At the molecular level, the rosids are characterized by the loss of function of the chloroplast infA gene and the absence of the coxII.i3 intron in the mitochondrion.

=== Asterids ===
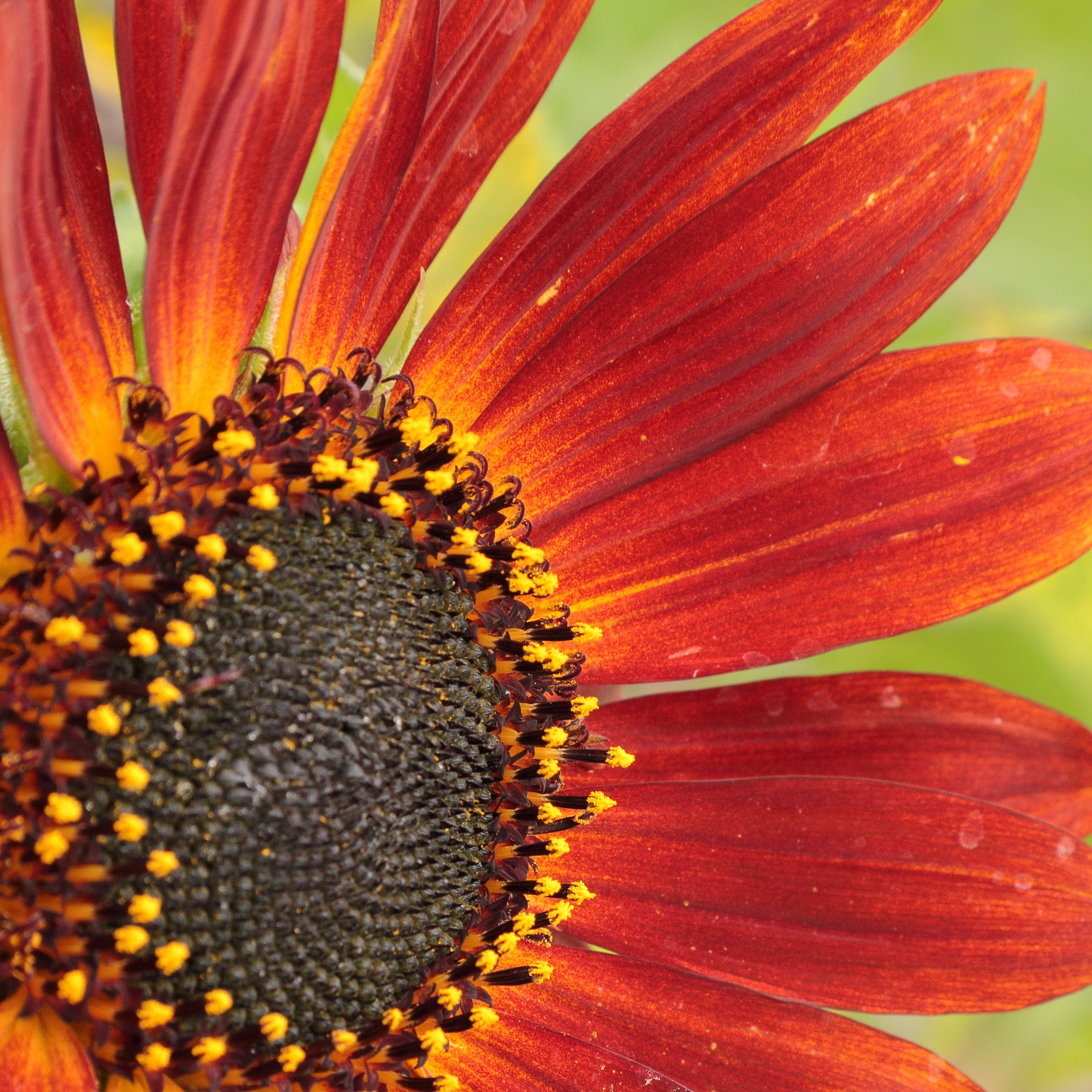
Inflorescence of an asteraceae.

The asterids are a large group of eudicotyledons that includes approximately 80 000 species, grouped in 13 orders and more than a hundred families, and between a third and a quarter of the total number of angiosperm species. Together with the rosids, they constitute the two largest groups of eudicotyledons. They represent the most apotypic clade of the angiosperms, or, as it is inappropriately called, "most evolved". The group most likely originated in the Cenozoic, about 50 million years ago, and its success is related to its adaptation to insect pollinators. Four of the largest families of angiosperms belong to this clade: the Asteraceae, the Rubiaceae, the Lamiaceae and the Apocynaceae.

The plants belonging to this clade are characterized by being herbaceous, with hermaphrodite, zygomorphic flowers—that is, they admit only one plane of symmetry—that are pollinated by insects. In addition, the stamens are arranged in a circle and the petals of the corona are joined forming a tube. The gynoecium is formed by two welded carpels. The flowers are often arranged in tight inflorescences, such as the ears of the labiatae and plantaginaceae or the capitula (heads) of the compositae.

== Evolution and phylogeny ==
The age of this clade has been estimated at 113 to 116 million years. The oldest macrofossils of eudicots, which unfortunately cannot be attributed to any extant group, belong to the Cretaceous-Cenomanian, just 96–94 million years old.

Analyses of complete chloroplast genome sequences allowed us to resolve the relationships among the major Pentapetalae clades. Immediately after diverging from the Gunnerales, the Pentapetalae diverged into three major subclades: (i) the Dilleniaceae, (ii) the superrosid clade including the Saxifragales, Vitaceae and Rosids, and (iii) the superasterid clade composed of the Berberidopsidales, Santalales, Caryophyllales and Asterids. The close relationship demonstrated at the molecular scale between Saxifragales, Vitaceae and rosids is congruent with their morphological affinities. In fact, these clades form the so-called "core of the rosids" in the Cronquist and Takhtajan classification systems. They all have an androcecium with jointed anthers, leaves with stipules, the endosperm with nuclear formation, and a micropyle that forms from the outer integument or both integuments.

Several putative synapomorphies may also characterize the superasterid clade. Thus, the "psyllulate" pollen or with a granular structure of the exine, the presence of sclereids in the leaves, the isomerism of the androcecium and the fused carpels unite the santalales, the caryophyllales and the asterids. Likewise, leaves without stipules may be another synapomorphic character, although Berberidopsidaceae have stipules and Aextoxicaceae lack them; thus, the ancestral status of Berberidopsidales and asterids is still unclear.

The initial divergence between the Dilleniales, superrosids and superasterids must have occurred very quickly, within a period of one million years after the initial separation of the Pentapetalae from the Gunnerales. Likewise, the superrosids and superasterids show an early and very rapid divergence since the lineages that led to the Vitaceae, Saxifragales, and rosids arose within a period of only five million years, as did those that led to the appearance of the Berberidopsidales, Caryophyllales, and asterids.

The following cladogram summarizes the phylogenetic relationships within the Pentapetalae clade and this clade.

- eudicots
  - basal eudicots
    (paraphyletic group: Ranunculales, Proteales, Trochodendrales, Buxales)
  - core eudicots
    - Gunnerales
    - Pentapetalae
      - Dilleniales
      - - superrosids
          - Saxifragales
          - rosids
            - Vitales
            - eurosids
              - fabids (8 orders)
              - malvids (8 orders)
        - superasterids
          - Santalales
          - - Berberidopsidales
            - - Caryophyllales
              - asterids
                - Cornales
                - - Ericales
                  - euasterids
                    - campanulids (7 orders)
                    - lamiids (8 orders)

The names lamiids (for euasterids I) and campanulids (for euasterids II) were suggested by Bremer et al. (2002) and later suggested fabiids (for eurosids I) and malvids (for eurosids II).
