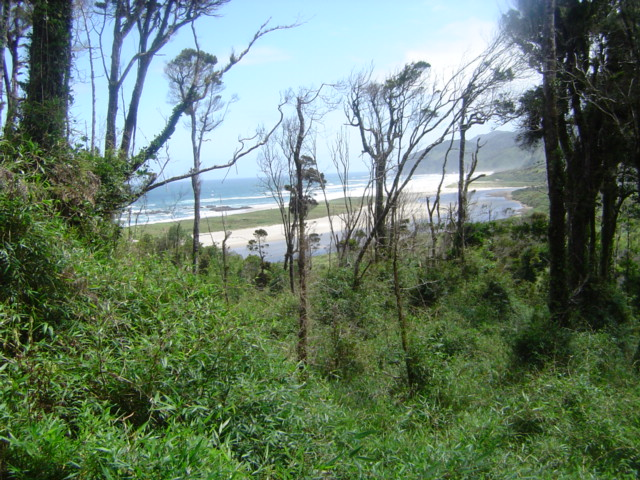

Conservation status
- Least Concern (IUCN 3.1)

Scientific classification
- Kingdom: Plantae
- Clade: Tracheophytes
- Clade: Angiosperms
- Clade: Eudicots
- Order: Berberidopsidales
- Family: Aextoxicaceae; Engl. & Gilg
- Genus: Aextoxicon; Ruiz & Pav.
- Species: A. punctatum

Binomial name
- Aextoxicon punctatum Ruiz & Pav.

= Aextoxicon =

Species of plant

Aextoxicon is a genus of dioecious trees native to southern Chile and Argentina. It is the only genus in the monotypic family Aextoxicaceae, and is itself represented by the olivillo (Aextoxicon punctatum). It is a large evergreen tree native to the forests of the Valdivian temperate rain forests and Magellanic subpolar forests of the Pacific coast of southern Chile, where it forms is a canopy tree in the broadleaf forests. It can reach 15 m tall.

The APG system (1998) and the APG II system (2003) left the family Aextoxicaceae unplaced in the core eudicots. It has since been included in the order Berberidopsidales. The genus was formerly often included in the family Euphorbiaceae.

== Description ==
Aextoxicon punctatum is a large tree often found in the canopy or emergent. It has opposite leaves with dark green coloration on the top and lighter green below, and is covered in rusty peltate scales. The flowers are actinomorphic and unisexual, in hanging racemes. The flowers have 5 sepals and 5 petals. Male flowers have 5 stamens opposite the sepals while female flowers have two carpels that fuse to form a bilocular ovary. The fruit is a single seeded drupe that resembles an olive, thus giving the plant its common name.

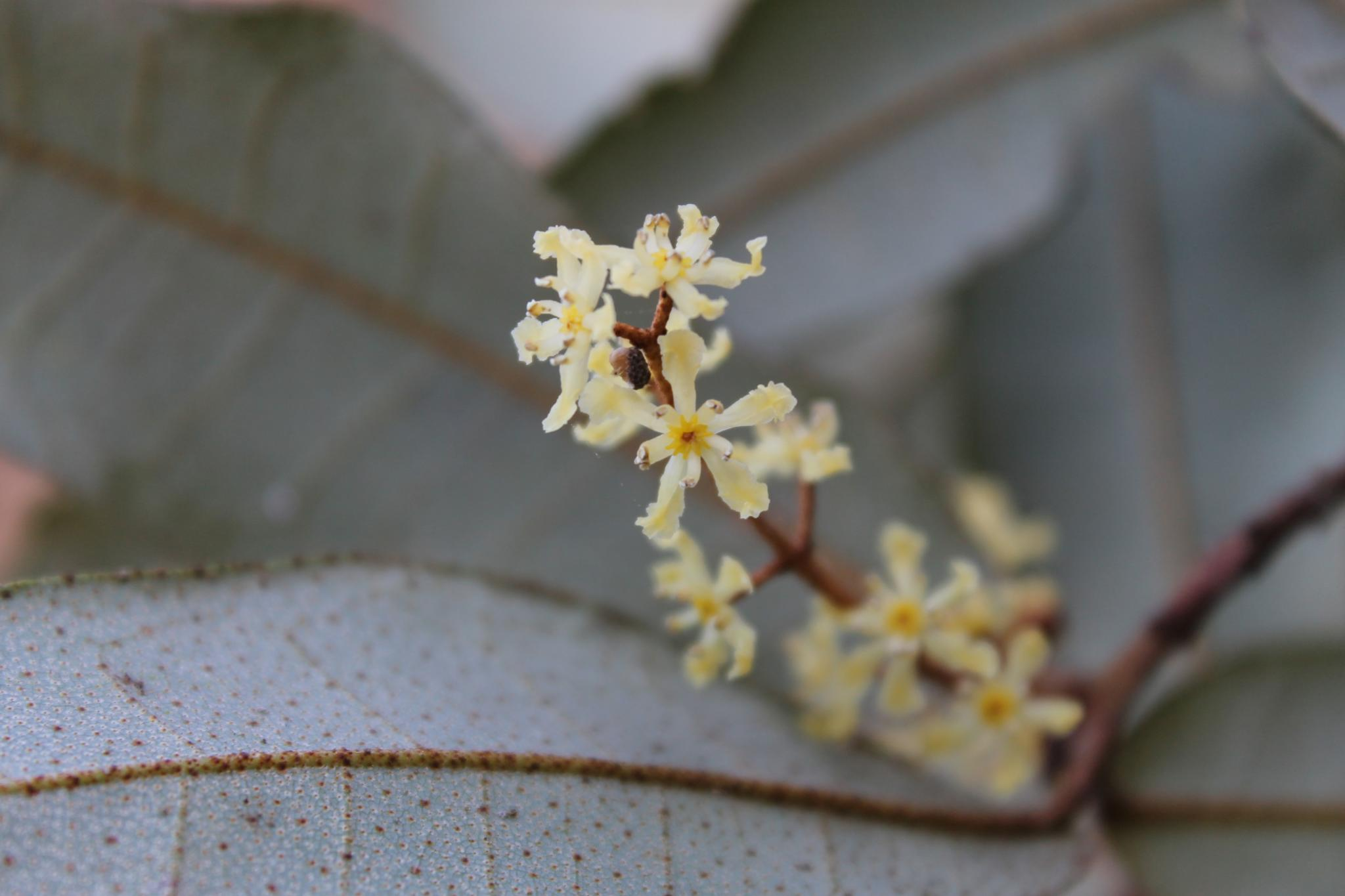
Male flower

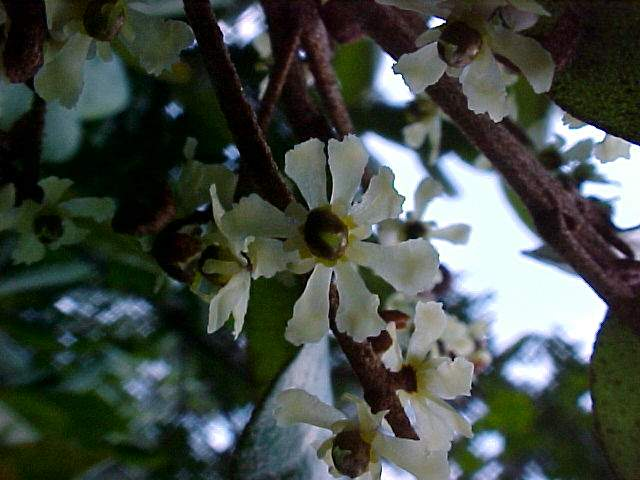
Female flower

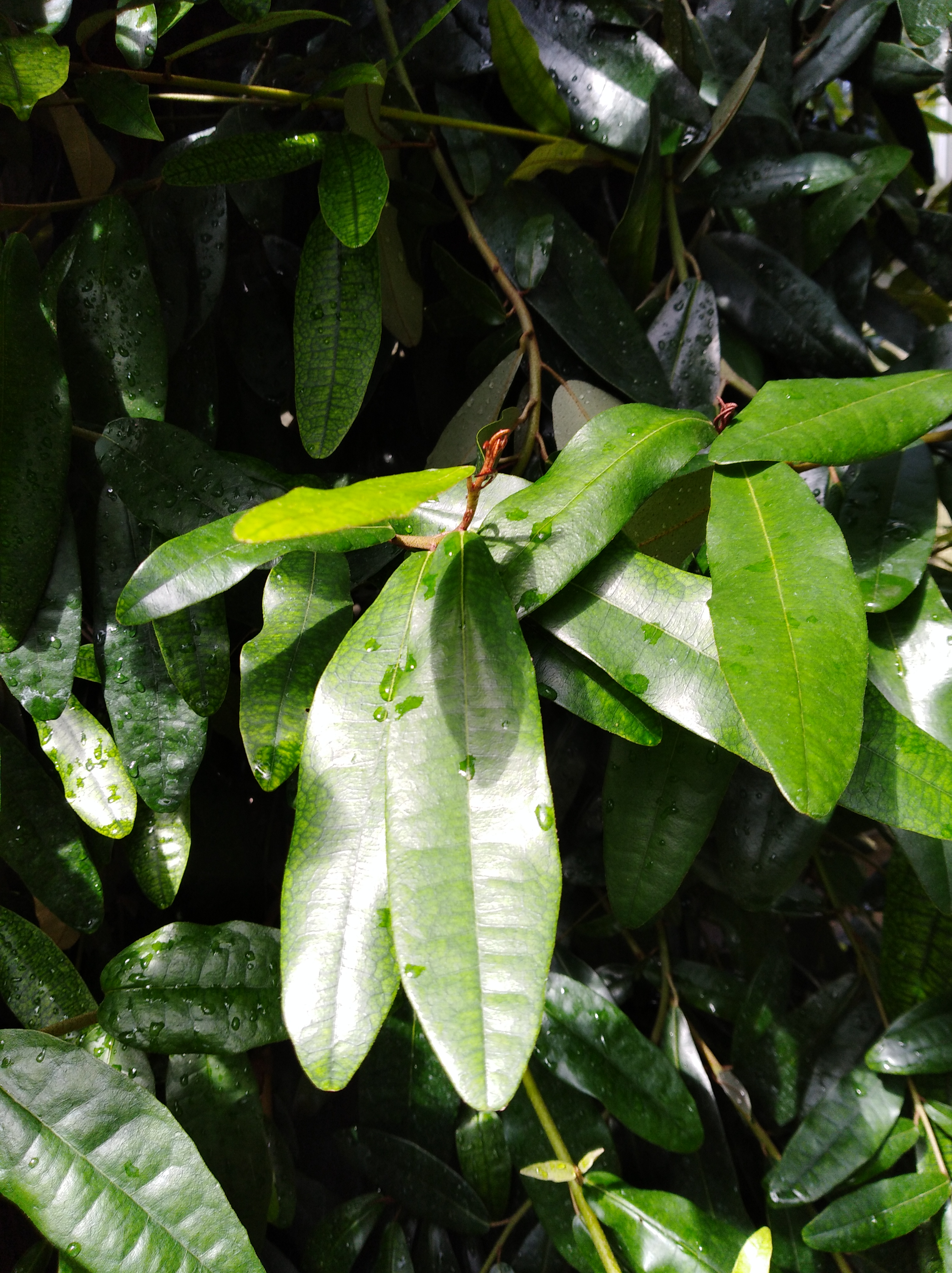
Leaves

== Distribution and habitat ==
Aextoxicon punctatum is found in Chile, usually in damp places from the Bosque de Fray Jorge National Park southwards to the Chiloé Archipelago, also in the Valdivian forest and Magellanic forests of the southern Pacific coast. In Argentina it is present in the middle reaches of the Rio Negro valley, being invasive on the island of Choele Choel, and it is common in the Lago Puelo National Park, Chubut.

== Uses ==
The tree is used for its high-quality timber.
