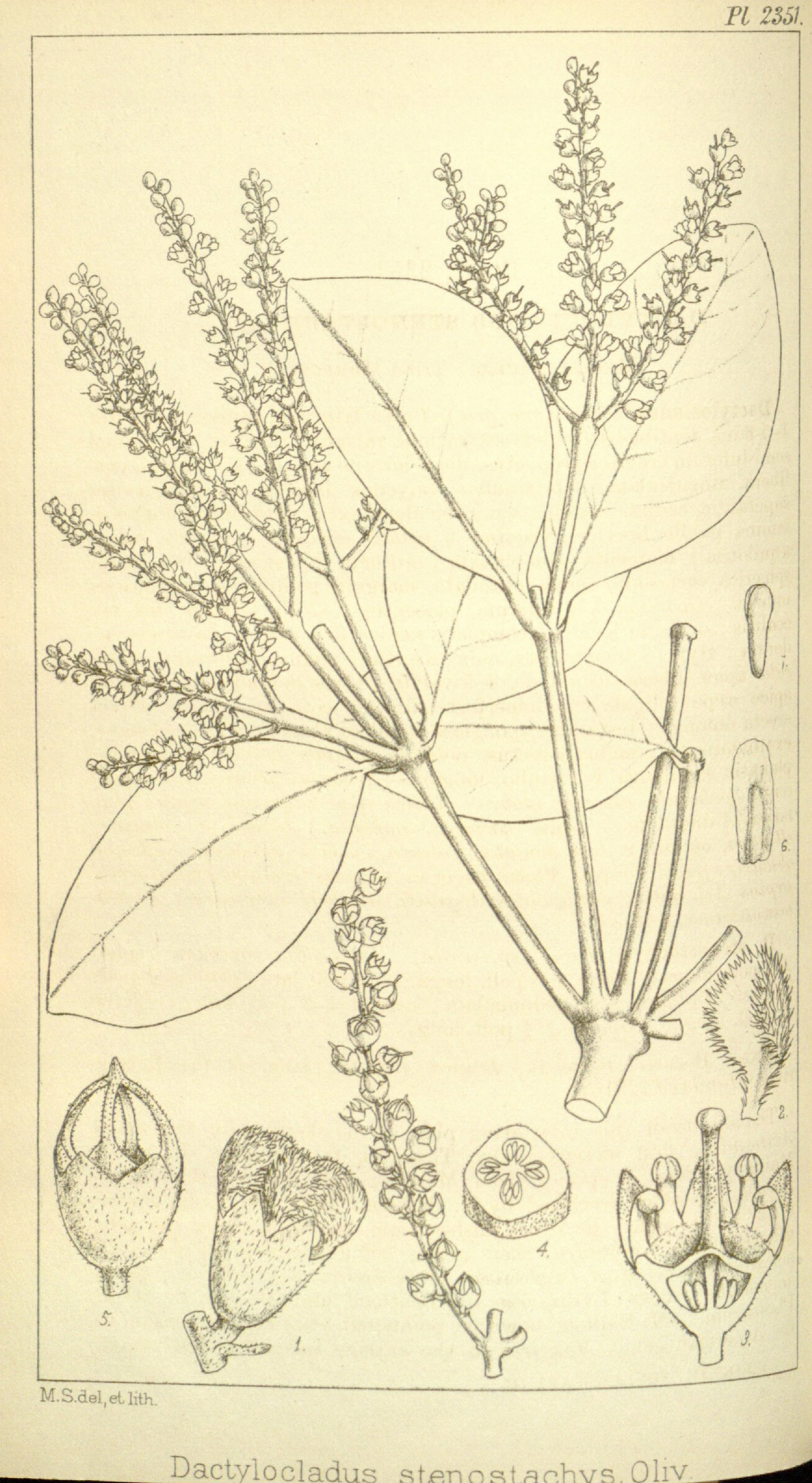
- Dactylocladus stenostachys (Hooker's Icones Plantarum)

Scientific classification
- Kingdom: Plantae
- Clade: Tracheophytes
- Clade: Angiosperms
- Clade: Eudicots
- Clade: Rosids
- Order: Myrtales
- Family: Crypteroniaceae; A.DC.

= Crypteroniaceae =

Family of flowering plants

The Crypteroniaceae are a family of flowering trees and shrubs. The family includes 13 species in three genera, native to Indomalaya.

== Genera ==
There are three genera of Crypteroniaceae, all native to Asian tropical forests:

- Axinandra Thwaites
- Crypteronia Blume
- Dactylocladus Oliv.

The genus Axinandra includes four species, one in Sri Lanka (A. zeylanica) and the others in Borneo and the Malay Peninsula. Crypteronia includes seven species, ranging from eastern India through Southeast Asia and southern China to the Malay Peninsula, Indonesia, and New Guinea. Dactylocladus consists of a single species, native to the lowland peat swamp forests of Borneo.

== Phylogeny ==
Morphological analyses, supported by recent chloroplast DNA analysis, indicates that Crypteroniaceae are most closely related to four small myrtalean families, Penaeaceae, Oliniaceae, and Rhynchocalycaceae of southern Africa, and Alzateaceae of Central and South America. The common ancestor of these five families is thought to have originated in western Gondwana during the Cretaceous epoch, and the Crypteroniaceae were carried northward with India after the breakup of the southern supercontinent, differentiating into the three genera before India's collision with Asia. The genera subsequently spread from India to the moist tropical forests of Southeast Asia.
