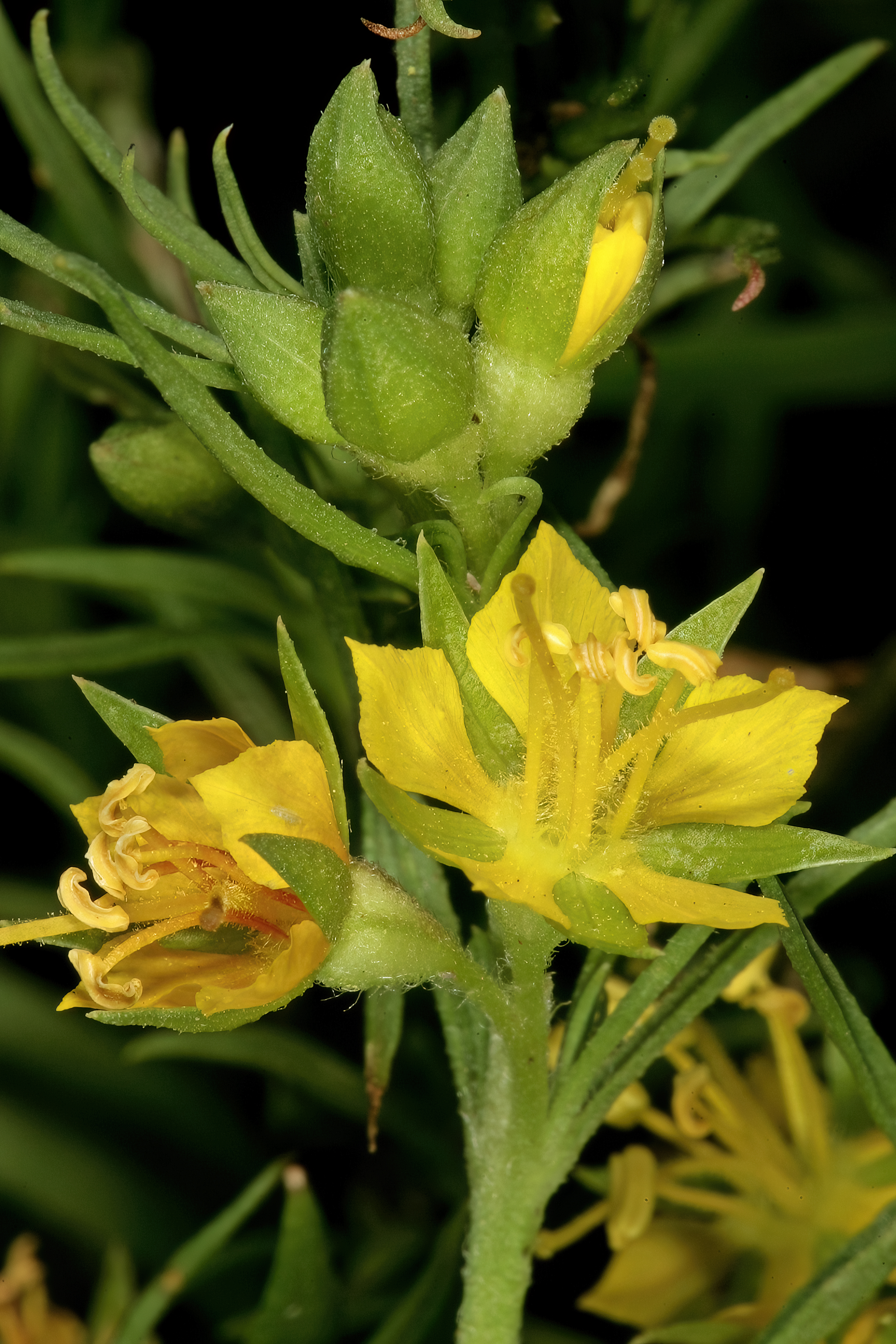
- Vahlia capensis

Scientific classification
- Kingdom: Plantae
- Clade: Tracheophytes
- Clade: Angiosperms
- Clade: Eudicots
- Clade: Asterids
- Order: Vahliales; Doweld
- Family: Vahliaceae; Airy Shaw
- Genus: Vahlia; Thunb.

Species
- 5 species; see text.

= Vahlia =

Genus of flowering plants

Vahlia is a genus of herbs and subshrubs that are native to Africa, the Arabian Peninsula and the Indian subcontinent. It contains described five species. The genus is placed alone in family Vahliaceae. This family had previously been placed in the order Saxifragales, and was reassigned to the new order Vahliales in 2016 by the APG IV system.

== Species ==
Five species are recognised as of April 2026:

- Vahlia capensis (L.f.) Thunb. – southern Africa
- Vahlia dichotoma (Murray) Kuntze – northern and eastern Africa, India, Sri Lanka
- Vahlia digyna (Retz.) Kuntze – Botswana, Burkina, Chad, Egypt, Ethiopia, Guinea-Bissau, India, Iraq, Kenya, Madagascar, Mali, Mauritania, Mozambique, Nigeria, Pakistan, Saudi Arabia, Senegal, Sri Lanka, Sudan-South Sudan, Tanzania, Zambia, Zimbabwe
- Vahlia geminiflora (Caill. & Delile) Bridson – Sahel to Egypt, Iraq, Iran
- Vahlia somalensis Chiov. – Somalia, Ethiopia, Kenya
