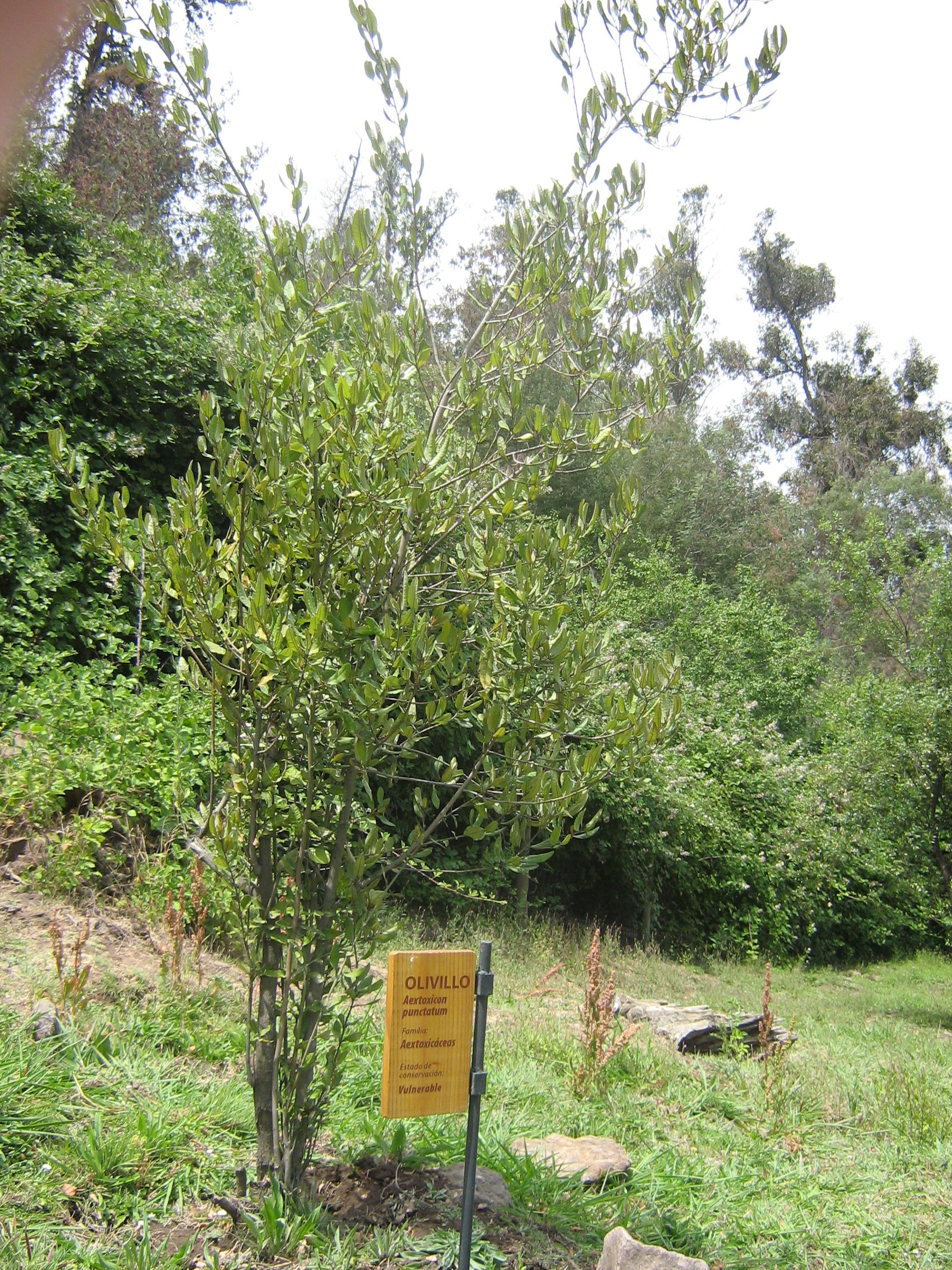

Scientific classification
- Kingdom: Plantae
- Clade: Tracheophytes
- Clade: Angiosperms
- Clade: Eudicots
- Clade: Superasterids
- Order: Berberidopsidales; Doweld

Families
- Aextoxicaceae; Berberidopsidaceae

= Berberidopsidales =

Order of flowering plants

Berberidopsidales is an order of Southern Hemisphere woody flowering plants. The name is newly accepted in the APG III system of plant taxonomy. APG II system, of 2003, mentions the possibility of recognizing the order, as comprising the families Berberidopsidaceae and Aextoxicaceae. However, APG II left the families unplaced as to order, assigning them to the clade core eudicots. The APG III system of 2009 formally recognized the order.

The family Aextoxicaceae is a monotypic family native to Chile; Berberidopsidaceae is a family of 2 genera and 3 species native to Chile and eastern Australia and Didytopia.
