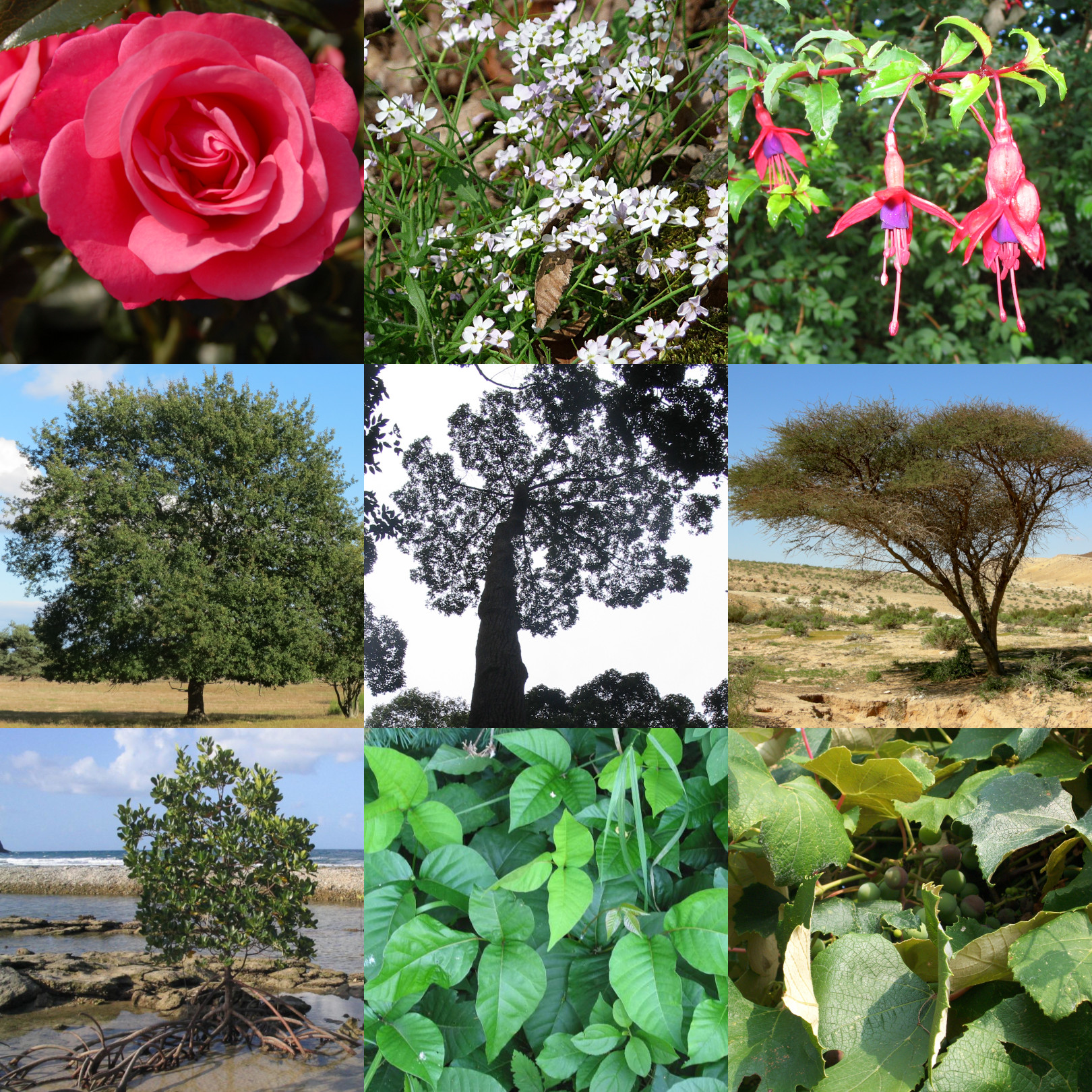
- Various modern rosid species

Scientific classification
- Kingdom: Plantae
- Clade: Tracheophytes
- Clade: Angiosperms
- Clade: Eudicots
- Clade: Superrosids
- Clade: Rosids

Orders
- Vitales; Eurosids Fabids Zygophyllales Celastrales Oxalidales Malpighiales Fabales Rosales Cucurbitales Fagales Malvids Geraniales Myrtales Crossosomatales Picramniales Sapindales Huerteales Malvales Brassicales

= Rosids =

Rosids Temporal range: Aptian or Albian–Recent

Large clade of flowering plants

The rosids are members of a large clade (monophyletic group) of flowering plants, containing about 70,000 species, more than a quarter of all angiosperms.

The clade is divided into 16 to 20 orders, depending upon circumscription and classification. These orders, in turn, together comprise about 140 families.

Fossil rosids are known from the Cretaceous period. Molecular clock estimates indicate that the rosids may have originated in the Aptian or Albian stages of the Cretaceous, between 125 and 99.6 million years ago.

Today's broadleaved forests are dominated by rosid species, which in turn help with diversification in many other living lineages. Additionally, rosid herbs and shrubs are a significant part of arctic/alpine and temperate floras. The clade also includes some aquatic, desert and parasitic plants.

== Name ==
The name is based upon the name "Rosidae", which had usually been understood to be a subclass. In 1967, Armen Takhtajan showed that the correct basis for the name "Rosidae" is a description of a group of plants published in 1830 by Friedrich Gottlieb Bartling. The clade was later renamed "Rosidae" and has been variously delimited by different authors. The name "rosids" is informal and not assumed to have any particular taxonomic rank like the names authorized by the ICBN. The rosids are monophyletic based upon evidence found by molecular phylogenetic analysis.

== Relationships ==
The rosids and Saxifragales form the superrosids clade. This is one of three groups that comprise the Pentapetalae (core eudicots minus Gunnerales), the others being Dilleniales and the superasterids (Berberidopsidales, Caryophyllales, Santalales, and asterids).

== Classification ==
Three different definitions of the rosids were used. Some authors included the orders Saxifragales and Vitales in the rosids. Others excluded both of these orders. The circumscription used in this article is that of the APG IV classification, which includes Vitales, but excludes Saxifragales.

Thus, the rosids consist of two groups: the order Vitales and the eurosids. The eurosids, in turn, are divided into two groups: fabids (Fabidae, eurosids I) and malvids (Malvidae, eurosids II).

=== Orders ===
The rosids consist of 17 orders. In addition to Vitales, there are eight orders in fabids and eight orders in malvids. Some of the orders have only recently been recognized. These are Vitales, Zygophyllales, Crossosomatales, Picramniales, and Huerteales.

== Phylogeny ==
The phylogeny of rosids shown below is adapted from the Angiosperm Phylogeny Website.

- rosids
  - Vitales
  - eurosids
    - fabids
      - Zygophyllales
      - - COM clade
          - Celastrales
          - - Malpighiales
            - Oxalidales
        - nitrogen‑fixing clade
          - Fabales
          - - Rosales
            - - Fagales
              - Cucurbitales
    - malvids
      - - Geraniales
        - Myrtales
      - - Crossosomatales
        - - Picramniales
          - - Sapindales
            - - Huerteales
              - - Brassicales
                - Malvales

The nitrogen-fixing clade contains a high number of actinorhizal plants (which have root nodules containing nitrogen fixing bacteria, helping the plant grow in poor soils). Not all plants in this clade are actinorhizal, however.
