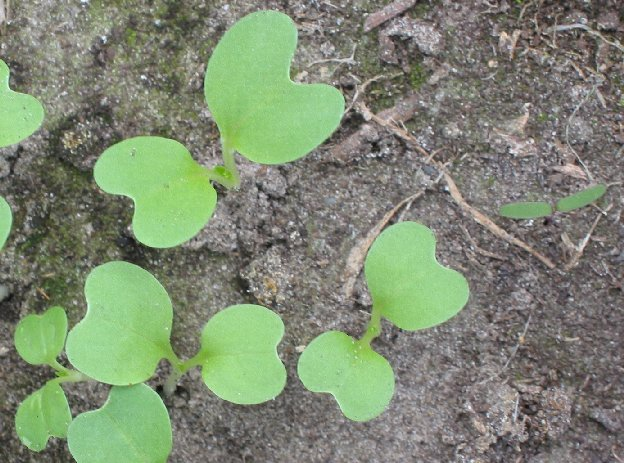
- Two seed leaves during germination (Brassica sp.)

Scientific classification
- Kingdom: Plantae
- Clade: Embryophytes
- Clade: Polysporangiophytes
- Clade: Tracheophytes
- Clade: Spermatophytes
- Clade: Angiosperms
- Clade: Eudicots

Clades (APG IV)
- Basal eudicots: Buxales; Proteales; Ranunculales; Trochodendrales; Core eudicots: Clades; Superasterids; Superrosids; Orders; Dilleniales; Gunnerales

= Eudicots =

Eudicots Temporal range: Early Cretaceous - recent

Clade of flowering plants

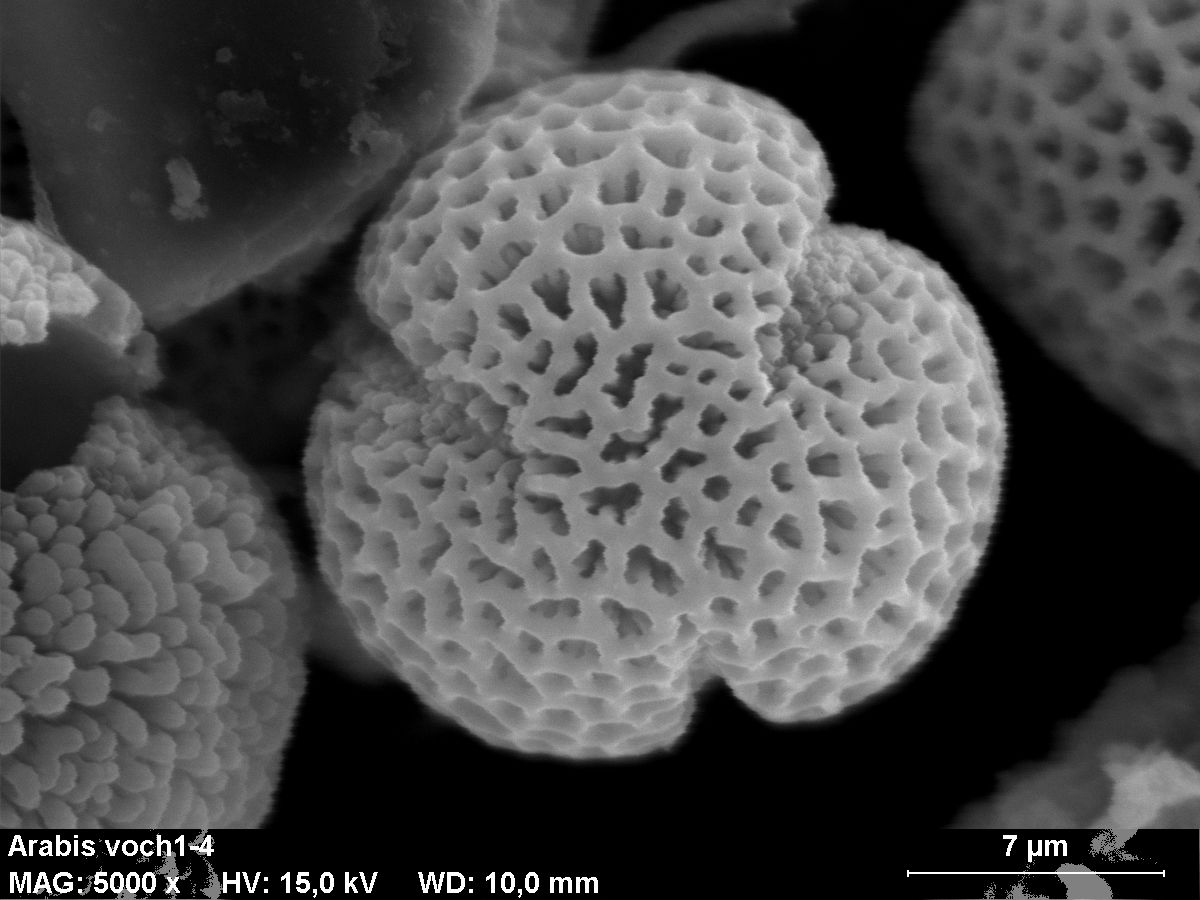
Arabis pollen has three colpi.

The eudicots or eudicotyledons are flowering plants that have two seed leaves (cotyledons) upon germination grouped under the single clade of Eudicotyledoneae. The term derives from dicotyledon (etymologically, eu = true; di = two; cotyledon = seed leaf). Historically, authors have used the terms tricolpates or non-magnoliid dicots. The current botanical terms were introduced in 1991, by evolutionary botanist James A. Doyle and paleobotanist Carol L. Hotton, to emphasize the later evolutionary divergence of dicots that develop tricolpate pollen from earlier, less specialized, dicots.

Scores of familiar plants are eudicots, including many commonly cultivated and edible plants, numerous trees, tropicals and ornamentals. Among the most well-known eudicot genera are those of the sunflower (Helianthus), dandelion (Taraxacum), forget-me-not (Myosotis), cabbage (Brassica), apple (Malus), buttercup (Ranunculus), maple (Acer) and macadamia (Macadamia). Most leafy, mid-latitude trees are also classified as eudicots, with notable exceptions being the magnolias and American tulip tree (Liriodendron)—which belong to the magnoliids.

== Description ==
The close relationships among flowering plants with tricolpate pollen grains was initially seen in morphological studies of shared derived characters. These plants have a distinct trait in their pollen grains of exhibiting three colpi or grooves paralleling the polar axis.

Later molecular evidence confirmed the genetic basis for the evolutionary relationships among flowering plants with tricolpate pollen grains and dicotyledonous traits. The term means "true dicotyledons", as it contains the majority of plants that have been considered dicots and have characteristics of the dicots. One of the genetic traits which defines the eudicots is the duplication of DELLA protein-encoding genes in their most recent common ancestor. The term "eudicots" has subsequently been widely adopted in botany to refer to one of the two largest clades of angiosperms (constituting over 70% of the angiosperm species), monocots being the other. The remaining angiosperms include magnoliids and what are sometimes referred to as basal angiosperms or paleodicots, but these terms have not been widely or consistently adopted, as they do not refer to a monophyletic group.

According to molecular clock calculations, the lineage that led to eudicots split from other plants about 134 million years ago or 155–160 million years ago. Fossil records suggested that basal eudicots were already diverse around 121 million years ago.

== Taxonomy ==
The earlier name for the eudicots is tricolpates, a name which refers to the grooved structure of the pollen. Members of the group have tricolpate pollen, or forms derived from it. These pollens have three or more pores set in furrows called colpi. In contrast, most of the other seed plants (that is the gymnosperms, the monocots and the paleodicots) produce monosulcate pollen, with a single pore set in a differently oriented groove called the sulcus. The name "tricolpates" is preferred by some botanists to avoid confusion with the dicots, a nonmonophyletic group.

The name "eudicots" (plural) is used in the APG systems (from APG system, of 1998, to APG IV system, of 2016) for classification of angiosperms. It is applied to a clade, a monophyletic group, which includes most of the (former) dicots.

"Tricolpate" is a synonym for the "Eudicot" monophyletic group, the "true dicotyledons" (which are distinguished from all other flowering plants by their tricolpate pollen structure). The number of pollen grain furrows or pores helps classify the flowering plants, with eudicots having three colpi (tricolpate), and other groups having one sulcus.

Pollen apertures are any modification of the wall of the pollen grain. These modifications include thinning, ridges and pores, they serve as an exit for the pollen contents and allow shrinking and swelling of the grain caused by changes in moisture content. The elongated apertures/ furrows in the pollen grain are called colpi (singular colpus), which, along with pores, are a chief criterion for identifying the pollen classes.

== Subdivisions ==
The eudicots can be divided into two groups: the basal eudicots and the core eudicots. Basal eudicot is an informal name for a paraphyletic group. The core eudicots are a monophyletic group. A 2010 study suggested the core eudicots can be divided into two clades, Gunnerales and a clade called Pentapetalae, comprising all the remaining core eudicots.

The Pentapetalae can be then divided into three clades:

- Dilleniales
- superrosids consisting of Saxifragales and rosids (the APG IV system includes the Vitales in the rosids)
- superasterids consisting of Santalales, Berberidopsidales, Caryophyllales and asterids

This division of the eudicots is shown in the following cladogram:

- eudicots
  - basal eudicots
    (paraphyletic group: Ranunculales, Proteales, Trochodendrales, Buxales)
  - core eudicots
    - Gunnerales
    - Pentapetalae
      - Dilleniales
      - - superrosids
          - Saxifragales
          - rosids
            - Vitales
            - eurosids
              - fabids (8 orders)
              - malvids (8 orders)
        - superasterids
          - Santalales
          - - Berberidopsidales
            - - Caryophyllales
              - asterids
                - Cornales
                - - Ericales
                  - euasterids
                    - campanulids (7 orders)
                    - lamiids (8 orders)

The following is a more detailed breakdown according to APG IV, showing within each clade and orders:

- clade Eudicots
  order Ranunculales
  order Proteales
  order Trochodendrales
  order Buxales
  clade Core eudicots
  order Gunnerales
  order Dilleniales
  clade Superrosids
  order Saxifragales
  clade Rosids
  order Vitales
  clade Fabids
  order Fabales
  order Rosales
  order Fagales
  order Cucurbitales
  order Oxalidales
  order Malpighiales
  order Celastrales
  order Zygophyllales
  clade Malvids
  order Geraniales
  order Myrtales
  order Crossosomatales
  order Picramniales
  order Malvales
  order Brassicales
  order Huerteales
  order Sapindales
  clade Superasterids
  order Berberidopsidales
  order Santalales
  order Caryophyllales
  clade Asterids
  order Cornales
  order Ericales
  clade Campanulids
  order Aquifoliales
  order Asterales
  order Escalloniales
  order Bruniales
  order Apiales
  order Dipsacales
  order Paracryphiales
  clade Lamiids
  order Solanales
  order Lamiales
  order Vahliales
  order Gentianales
  order Boraginales
  order Garryales
  order Metteniusales
  order Icacinales

== Bibliography ==
- Doyle, J.A.; Hotton, C.L. (1991). "Diversification of early angiosperm pollen in a cladistic context". In Blackmore, S.; Barnes, S.H. (eds.). Pollen and Spores. Patterns of Diversification. Systematics Association Publications. Vol. 44. Clarendon Press. pp. 169–195. ISBN 9780198577461.
- Judd, Walter S.; Olmstead, Richard G. (2004). "A survey of tricolpate (eudicot) phylogenetic relationships". American Journal of Botany. 91 (10): 1627–44. doi:10.3732/ajb.91.10.1627. PMID 21652313.
- Eudicots in Stevens, P. F. (2001 onwards). Angiosperm Phylogeny Website. Version 7, May 2006.
