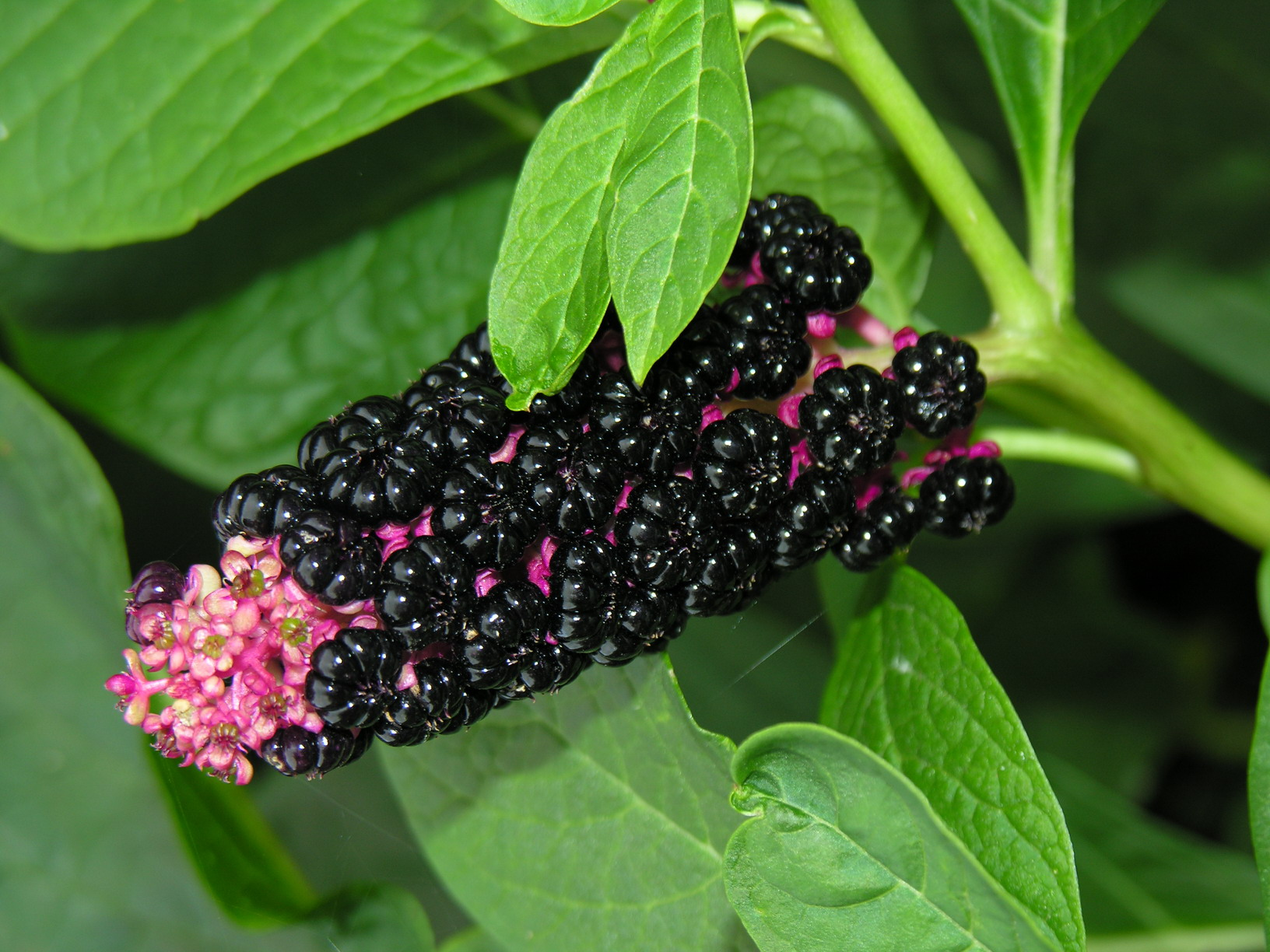
- Phytolacca acinosa

Scientific classification
- Kingdom: Plantae
- Clade: Embryophytes
- Clade: Tracheophytes
- Clade: Angiosperms
- Clade: Eudicots
- Order: Caryophyllales
- Family: Phytolaccaceae; R.Br.

Genera
- Agdestis Moc. & Sessé ex DC.; Anisomeria D.Don; Ercilla A.Juss.; Nowickea J.Martínez & J.A.McDonald; Phytolacca L.

Synonyms
- Agdestidaceae Nakai

= Phytolaccaceae =

Family of flowering plants

Phytolaccaceae is a family of flowering plants. Though almost universally recognized by taxonomists, its circumscription has varied. It is also known as the Pokeweed family.

The APG II system, of 2003 (unchanged from the APG system, of 1998), also recognizes this family and assigns it to the order Caryophyllales in the clade core eudicots. The family comprises five genera, totalling 33 known species. It is divided into the subfamilies Agdestioideae and Phytolaccoideae, with the former Rivinioideae in the Takhtajan system, now placed in its own family Petiveriaceae

== Genera and species ==
The Phytolaccaceae includes the following genera:

- Agdestis Moc. & Sessé ex DC. — 1 species
- Anisomeria D.Don — 3 species
- Ercilla A.Juss. — 2 species
- Nowickea J.Martínez & J.A.McDonald — 2 species
- Phytolacca L. — ca 25 species

== Former genera ==
The following genera were previously included in the Phytolaccaceae:

- Achatocarpus Triana → Achatocarpaceae
- Barbeuia Thouars → Barbeuiaceae
- Gallesia Casar. → Petiveriaceae
- Gisekia L. → Gisekiaceae
- Hilleria Vell. → Petiveriaceae
- Gyrostemon Desf. → Gyrostemonaceae
- Ledenbergia Klotzsch ex Moq. → Petiveriaceae
- Lophiocarpus Turcz. → Lophiocarpaceae
- Microtea Sw. → Microteaceae
- Monococcus F.Muell. → Petiveriaceae
- Petiveria L. → Petiveriaceae
- Phaulothamnus A.Gray → Achatocarpaceae
- Rivina L. → Petiveriaceae
- Schindleria H.Walter → Petiveriaceae
- Seguieria Loefl. → Petiveriaceae
- Stegnosperma Benth. → Stegnospermataceae
- Trichostigma A.Rich. → Petiveriaceae
