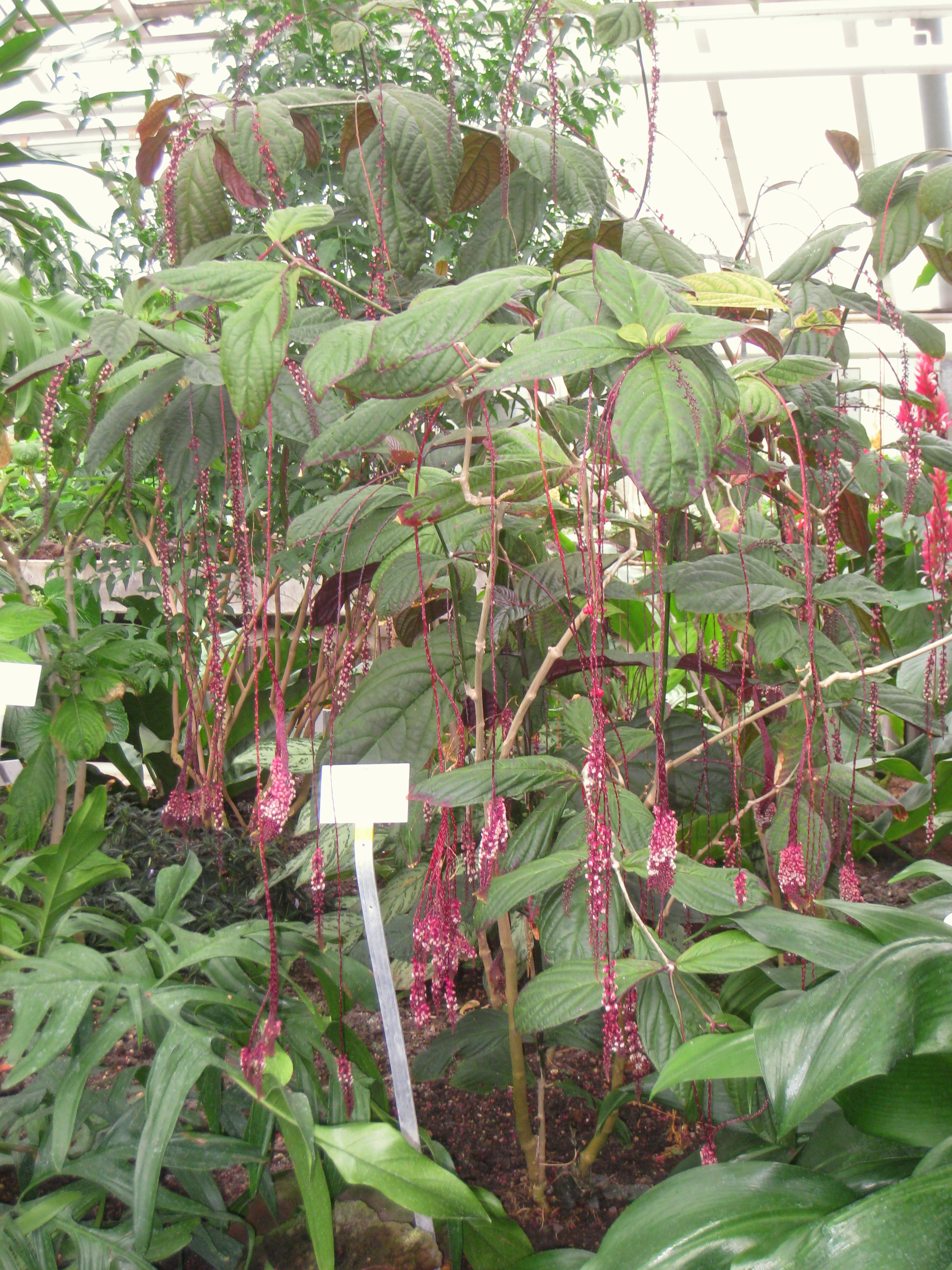

Scientific classification
- Kingdom: Plantae
- Clade: Tracheophytes
- Clade: Angiosperms
- Clade: Eudicots
- Order: Caryophyllales
- Family: Petiveriaceae
- Genus: Trichostigma
- Species: T. peruvianum

Binomial name
- Trichostigma peruvianum (Moq.) H.Walter

= Trichostigma peruvianum =

Species of flowering plant

Trichostigma peruvianum is a species of flowering plant in the family Petiveriaceae. It was formerly placed in the family Phytolaccaceae. It is native to Ecuador, Colombia, and Peru.
