= Augustus Quirinus Rivinus =

German physician and botanist (1652-1723)

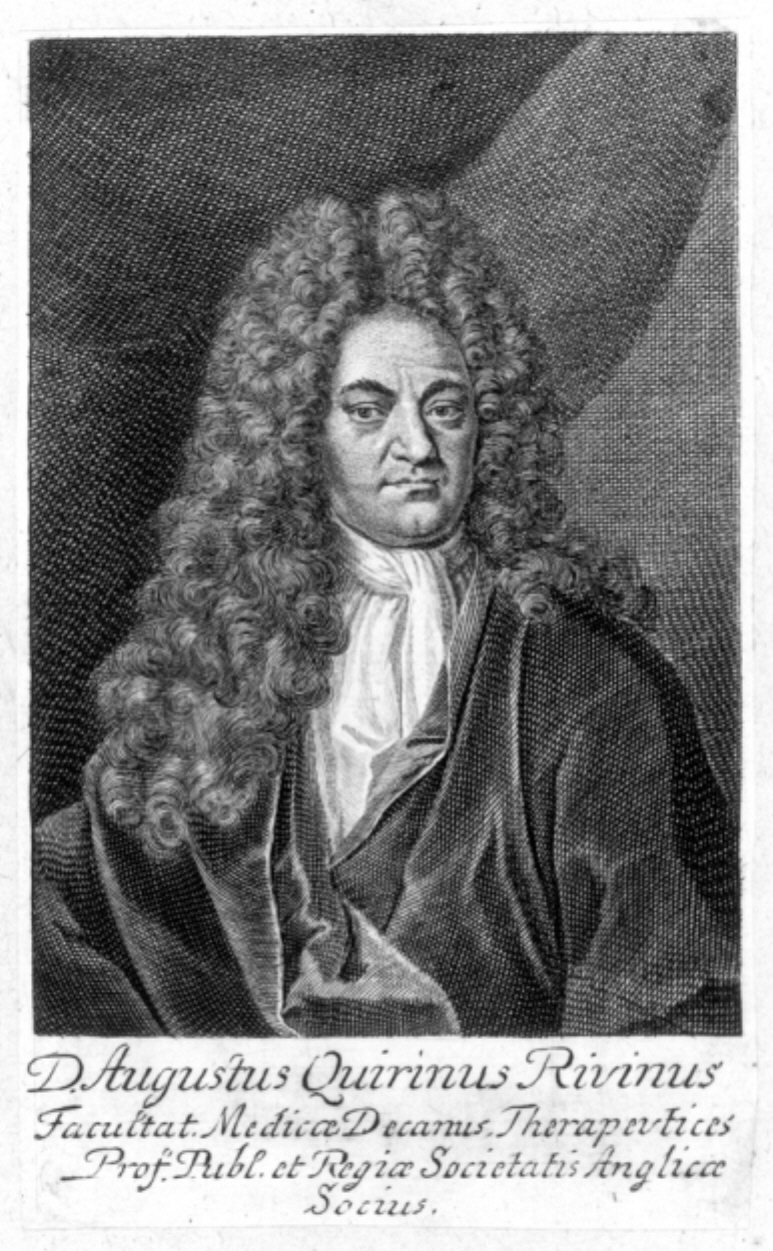

Augustus Quirinus Rivinus (9 December 1652 – 20 December 1723) is the professional name of August Bachmann or A. Q. Bachmann (Rivinus from rīvus latinizing the German Bach) who was a German physician and botanist who helped to develop better ways of classifying plants.

== Life and work ==
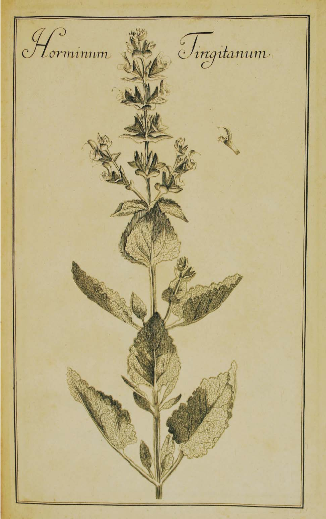
"Horminum tingitanum" (Salvia tingitana) from Ordo Plantarum 1690

Rivinus was born in Leipzig, Germany, and studied at the University of Leipzig (1669–1671), continued his studies in the University of Helmstedt (where he received M.D. in 1676). In 1677, he started lecturing in medicine at the University of Leipzig, in 1691 appointed to two chairs, that of physiology and of botany, and made the curator of the University medical garden. In 1701, he became professor of pathology, in 1719, professor of therapeutics and permanent dean of the Faculty of Medicine. The same year he became a Fellow of the Royal Society. Because of his interest also in astronomy, by the last decade of his life (around 1713), Rivinus was nearly completely blind from looking at sunspots. He died in Leipzig.

In his Introductio generalis in rem herbariam and three books on the plant orders (which comprised but a small part of the whole projected work on a methodical description of plants), Rivinus introduced several important innovations which were later used by other botanists (Joseph Pitton de Tournefort and Carl Linnaeus among them). He classified the plants according to the structure of the flower. Like John Ray he extensively used dichotomous keys which led first to the higher groups, which he called higher genera (genus summum) of plant orders (ordo), and then to the lower genera.

Rivinus was one of the first to apply consistently the rule that the names of all species in a genus should start with the same word (generic name). If a genus contained just one species, the generic name would be its only name. If there were more than one species in the genus, their names should consist of the generic name followed by differentia specifica (a brief diagnostic phrase). His nomenclature differed from de Tournefort's in not using a diagnostic phrase with the first plant of a genus, adding differentiae only to the second and subsequent plant species. He corresponded with John Ray on matters of plant classification.

== Principal works ==
- Introductio generalis in rem herbariam. Lipsiae Leipzig: Typis Christoph. Güntheri, 1690. [8] + 39 p. Digital edition by Beic Digital Library
- Ordo Plantarum qvae sunt Flore Irregulari Monopetalo. Lipsiae: Typis Christoph. Fleischeri, 1690. 22 + [4] p. + 124 tab. Digital edition by Beic Digital Library
- Ordo Plantarum qvae sunt Flore Irregulari Tetrapetalo. Lipsiae: Typis Christoph. Fleischeri, 1691. [6] + 20 + [4] p. + 121 tab.
- Ordo Plantarum qvae sunt Flore Irregulari Pentapetalo. Lipsiae: Typis Joh. Heinrici Richteri, 1699. [6] + 28 + [4] p. + 139 tab. Digital edition by Beic Digital Library
- D.A.Q.R. ad celeberrimum virum dominum Johan. Rajum... Epistola Lipsiae: Prostat apud Davidem Fleisherum, 1694. 24 p.
- Censura medicamentorum officinalium. Lipsiae, J. Fritsch, 1701
- Manuductio ad Chemiam pharmaceuticam Norimbergae, Tauber, 1718 Digital edition by the University and State Library Düsseldorf

== Associated eponyms ==
- notch of Rivinus: a notch in the upper part of the tympanic portion of the temporal bone.
- Rivinus’ ligament: also known as Shrapnell's membrane; the flaccid portion of the tympanic membrane.
- Viola riviniana: a species of violet; its popular name is the common dog violet.
- Ducts of Rivinus: The collective name for the minor sublingual salivary ducts.
- Rivina, a genus of flowering plants in family Petiveriaceae, formerly placed in the pokeweed family, Phytolaccaceae.

== See also ==
- Joseph Pitton de Tournefort
- John Ray
- Carl Linnaeus
