= Anisomeria =

Anisomeria is the scientific name of two genera of organisms and may refer to:

- Anisomeria (beetle), a genus of insects in the family Dytiscidae
- Anisomeria (plant), a genus of plants in the family Phytolaccaceae
