= Ercilla =

Ercilla may refer to:

- Ercilla, Chile, a commune of Chile's Araucanía region
- Ercilla (magazine), a bi-weekly Chilean news magazine
- Ercilla (plant), a genus of flowering plants in the Phytolaccaceae family
- 3114 Ercilla, a main belt asteroid
- Alonso de Ercilla (1533–1594), a Spanish nobleman, soldier, epic poet, and author of La Araucana
