= Guiné =

Guiné is a Portuguese word that either refers to

- The Petiveria genus of flowering plants in Brazilian Portuguese
- The country of Guinea
