= Ethmia oterosella =

Scientific classification
- Kingdom: Animalia
- Phylum: Arthropoda
- Class: Insecta
- Order: Lepidoptera
- Family: Depressariidae
- Genus: Ethmia
- Species: E. oterosella

Binomial name
- Ethmia oterosella Busck, 1934

Synonyms
- Ethmia oterostella

Species of moth

Ethmia oterosella is a moth in the family Depressariidae. It is found in Cuba.

The length of the forewings is 6.7 to 8 mm (0.26 to 0.31 in). The ground color of the forewings is divided by a line. The dorsal half is whitish and the costal half blackish along the line, blending to brown through the cell and to whitish at the costa. The terminal area is mostly whitish brown. The ground color of the hindwings is whitish, becoming pale brownish distally.

The larvae possibly feed on Stegnospermum halimifolia or Trichostigma octandrum.
