= Jean-François Séguier =

French archaeologist, epigraphist, astronomer and botanist

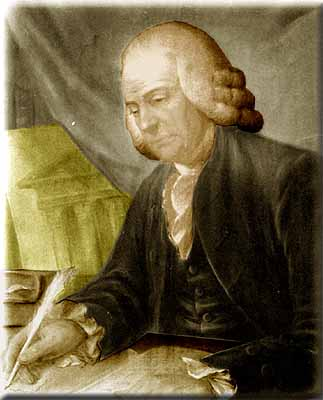
Jean-François Séguier

Jean-François Séguier (French pronunciation: [ʒɑ̃ fʁɑ̃swa segje]; 25 November 1703 – 1 September 1784) was a French archaeologist, epigraphist, astronomer and botanist from Nîmes.

He studied law in Montpellier, during which time, he developed a passion for botany. He was a friend and collaborator to Scipio Maffei, with whom he took an extended scientific tour throughout Europe (1732–36). In 1755 he became a member of the Académie de Nîmes, serving as its secrétaire perpétuel from 1765 to 1784. In 1772 he became a member of the Académie royale des Inscriptions et Belles-Lettres.

The plant genus Seguieria (family Petiveriaceae, Loefl., 1758) commemorates his name, as do the botanical species Ranunculus seguieri (Vill., 1779), Euphorbia seguieriana (Neck., 1770), and Dianthus seguieri (Vill., 1779).

== Published works ==
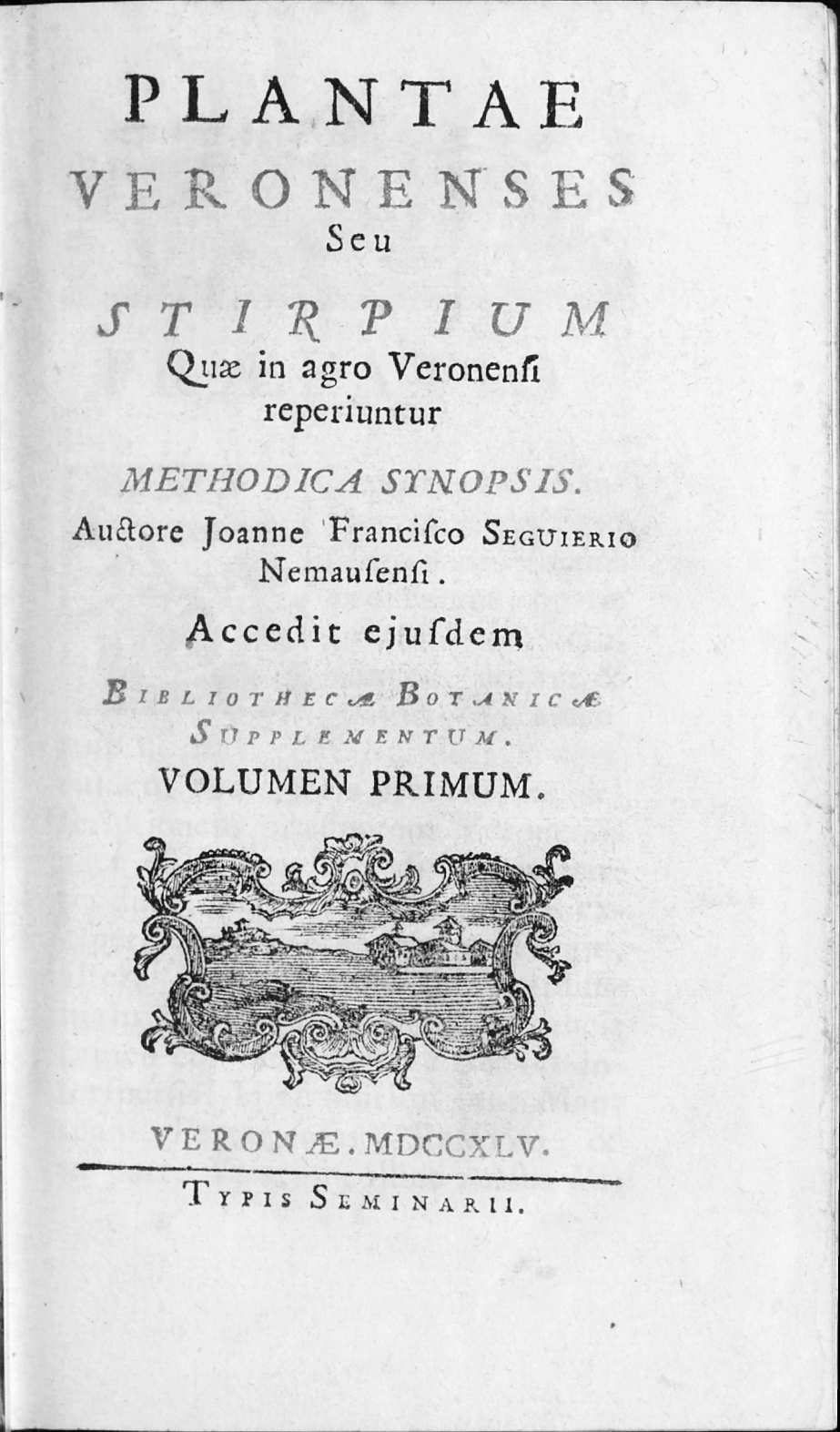
Plantae veronenses, 1745

His written works include a detailed description of the flora in the vicinity of Verona, titled Plantae Veronenses, seu Stirpium quae in agro Veronensi repriuntur (3 volumes 1745–54). Other noted works associated with Séguier are:

- Bibliotheca botanica, sive, Catalogus auctorum et librorum omnium qui de re botanica, de medicamentis ex vegetabilibus paratis, de re rustica, & de horticultura tractant, 1740. Séguier's Bibliotheca botanica includes Ovidio Montalbani's Bibliotheca botanica as an appendix.
- Bibliotheca botanica (in Latin). Den Haag: Jean Neaulme. 1740.
- Plantae veronenses (in Latin). Vol. 1. Verona: Tipografia del Seminario. 1745.
- Plantae veronenses (in Latin). Vol. 2. Verona: Tipografia del Seminario. 1745.
- Dissertation sur l'ancienne inscription de la Maison-carrée de Nismes, 1759 – Dissertation on the ancient inscriptions of the Maison Carrée in Nîmes.
- Jean-François Séguier, Pierre Baux, lettres : 1733-1756.

== Standard author abbreviation ==
The standard author abbreviation Ség. is used to indicate this person as the author when citing a botanical name.
