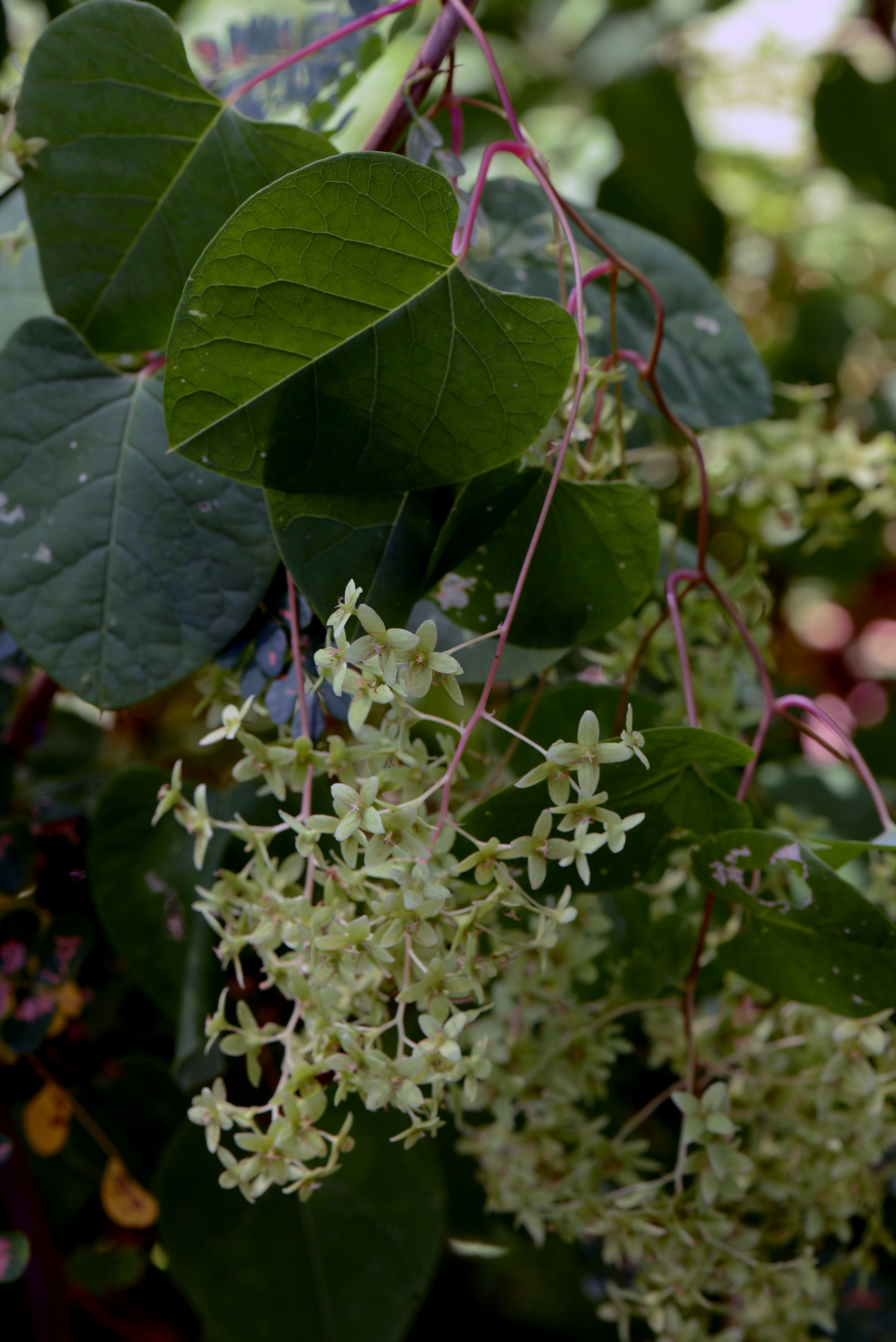

Scientific classification
- Kingdom: Plantae
- Clade: Tracheophytes
- Clade: Angiosperms
- Clade: Eudicots
- Order: Caryophyllales
- Family: Phytolaccaceae
- Subfamily: Agdestidoideae; Nowicke
- Genus: Agdestis; Moc. & Sessé ex DC.
- Species: A. clematidea

Binomial name
- Agdestis clematidea Moc. & Sessé ex DC.

= Agdestis =

Genus of flowering plants

Agdestis is a genus of flowering plants containing a single species Agdestis clematidea, a vine native to Mexico & Central America, and introduced to Cuba, Puerto Rico, Florida, and Texas (though potentially native to the latter). Its common name rockroot refers to the large boulder-like root.

== Taxonomy ==
Agdestis is usually placed in the Phytolaccaceae family. Its classification is uncertain, however, as several studies of molecular phylogenetics have found it to be possibly the sister taxon of Sarcobatus, also of uncertain classification and often placed in its own family, Sarcobataceae.
