= Schindleria (plant) =

Scientific classification
- Kingdom: Plantae
- Clade: Tracheophytes
- Clade: Angiosperms
- Clade: Eudicots
- Order: Caryophyllales
- Family: Petiveriaceae
- Genus: Schindleria; H.Walter

Species
- See text

Genus of flowering plants

Schindleria is a genus of flowering plants in the family Petiveriaceae.

It is native to Bolivia, Peru and Paraguay in South America.

== Description ==
They have a semi-shrubby nature, with erect racemes with a single floral bract and 2 minute bracteoles (a small bracts). They have bisexual (bearing both male and female reproductive organs), actinomorphic flowers (regular or radially symmetrical). The flowers have four petals, with usually 3 parallel veins. They many stamens (between 12 and 25), and the ovary is cylindric or ovoid (in shape), and one-carpellate (consisting of carpels). The style is absent and the stigma is penicillate (tufted like an artist's brush). It has utricle type of fruit (like a small bladder).

The pollen grains are similar in form to those of members of the Chenopodioideae family (including Amaranthus and Celosia). They are about 27 μms in diameter.

== Known species ==
In 1906, when published there were 4 known species, (S. glabra, S. racemosa, S. rivinoides and S. Rosea) then 3 other species were added later up to 1952. S. mollis in 1909, S. weberbaueri in 1923 and S. densiflora (which was transferred from Rivina densiflora) in 1952. Then in 1962, American botanist Joan W. Nowicke re-ordered the genus and only accepted just 2 known species, Schindleria densiflora and Schindleria racemosa. Then in 2006, Jon M. Ricketson added Schindleria tomentosa.

There are 3 accepted species, according to Plants of the World Online,

- Schindleria densiflora (Kuntze) Monach. – Bolivia, Peru
- Schindleria racemosa (Britton ex Rusby) H.Walter – Bolivia, Paraguay and Peru
- Schindleria tomentosa Ricketson – Peru

The type species was never named.

== Taxonomy ==
The genus name of Schindleria is in honour of Anton Karl Schindler (1879–1964), a German dentist and botanist. It was first described and published in Beibl. Bot. Jahrb. Syst. Vol.85 on page 24 in 1906.

It was once thought to be part of the Phytolaccaceae family, before moving to the Petiveriaceae family, in 1985.

The genus is recognized by the United States Department of Agriculture and the Agricultural Research Service, but they do not list any known species.

== Other sources ==
- Field Columbian Museum, 1936, Fieldiana: Botany, Volume 13, Part 2, Flora of Peru
- Hernández-Ledesma, P., Berendsohn, W. G., Borsch, T., Mering, S. v., Akhani, H., Arias, S., Castañeda-Noa, I., Eggli, U., Eriksson, R., Flores-Olvera, H., Fuentes-Bazán, S., Kadereit, G., Klak, C., Korotkova, N., Nyffeler R., Ocampo G., Ochoterena, H., Oxelman, B., Rabeler, R. K., Sanchez, A., Schlumpberger, B. O. & Uotila, P. 2015. A taxonomic backbone for the global synthesis of species diversity in the angiosperm order Caryophyllales. Willdenowia 45(3): 281–383
