= Anton Karl Schindler =

German botanist and dentist (1879–1964)

Anton Karl Schindler (15 August 1879 in Bremen – 1964) was a German dentist and botanist.

He studied botany at the universities of Göttingen, Strasbourg and Halle, receiving his doctorate at Erlangen in 1904. From 1905 to 1910 he conducted botanical research in China, during which time he also taught classes in natural sciences at Peking University and in Shanghai. Afterwards, he returned to Germany, and spent several years as a schoolteacher in Magdeburg, Posen and Jüterbog. From 1925 to 1929 he studied dentistry, then worked as a dentist in the communities of Großalmerode (1929–32) and Döberitz (1932–56). In retirement he lived in Düsseldorf.

In 1906, botanist Hans Paul Heinrich Walter published Schindleria, which is a genus of flowering plants from South America, in the family Petiveriaceae. It was named in Anton Karl Schindler's honour.

== Selected works ==
- Die Abtrennung der Hippuridaceen von den Halorrhagaceen, 1904 – The separation of Hippuridaceae from Haloragaceae.
- Halorrhagaceae, 1905 – Haloragaceae.
- Botanische Streifzüge in den Bergen von Ost-China, 1912 – Botanical journeys in the mountains of eastern China.
- Das Genus Pseudarthria Wight et Arn, 1914 – The genus Pseudarthria (Wight et Arn.)
- Desmodiinae novae, 1916 – New Desmodiinae.
- Die Desmodiinen in der botanischen Literatur nach Linné, 1928 – Desmodiinae in the botanical literature according to Linnaeus.
- Der Garten und seine Jahreszeiten, 1929 (with Paul Kache) – The garden and its seasons.
