= Nowickea =

Scientific classification
- Kingdom: Plantae
- Clade: Embryophytes
- Clade: Tracheophytes
- Clade: Angiosperms
- Clade: Eudicots
- Order: Caryophyllales
- Family: Phytolaccaceae
- Genus: Nowickea; J.Martínez & J.A.McDonald

Genus of flowering plant

Nowickea is a genus of flowering plants belonging to the family Phytolaccaceae.

It is native to Mexico.

The genus name of Nowickea is in honour of Joan W. Nowicke (b. 1938), an American botanist who worked for the Smithsonian Institution, between 1972 and 1999, in the Department of Botany, from the National Museum of Natural History. It was first described and published in Brittonia Vol.41 on page 399 in 1989.

== Known species ==
According to Kew:

- Nowickea glabra J.Martínez & J.A.McDonald
- Nowickea xolocotzii J.Martínez & J.A.McDonald
