= Microtea bahiensis =

Scientific classification
- Kingdom: Plantae
- Clade: Tracheophytes
- Clade: Angiosperms
- Clade: Eudicots
- Order: Caryophyllales
- Family: Microteaceae
- Genus: Microtea
- Species: M. bahiensis

Binomial name
- Microtea bahiensis Marchior. & J.C.Siqueira

Species of plant

Microtea bahiensis is a species of flowering plant in the family Microteaceae. It is native to Bahia, Brazil, grows primarily in the seasonally dry tropical biome, and is a perennial subshrub.
