= Microtea celosioides =

Scientific classification
- Kingdom: Plantae
- Clade: Tracheophytes
- Clade: Angiosperms
- Clade: Eudicots
- Order: Caryophyllales
- Family: Microteaceae
- Genus: Microtea
- Species: M. celosioides

Binomial name
- Microtea celosioides (Spreng.) Moq. ex Sennikov & Sukhor.

Species of plant

Microtea celosioides is a species of flowering plant in the family Microteaceae. Native to Central and Eastern Brazil, as well as Paraguay, this annual or biennial herb grows primarily in seasonally dry tropical biomes.

== Taxonomy ==
This species has 2 homotypic synonyms and 3 heterotypic synonyms.
