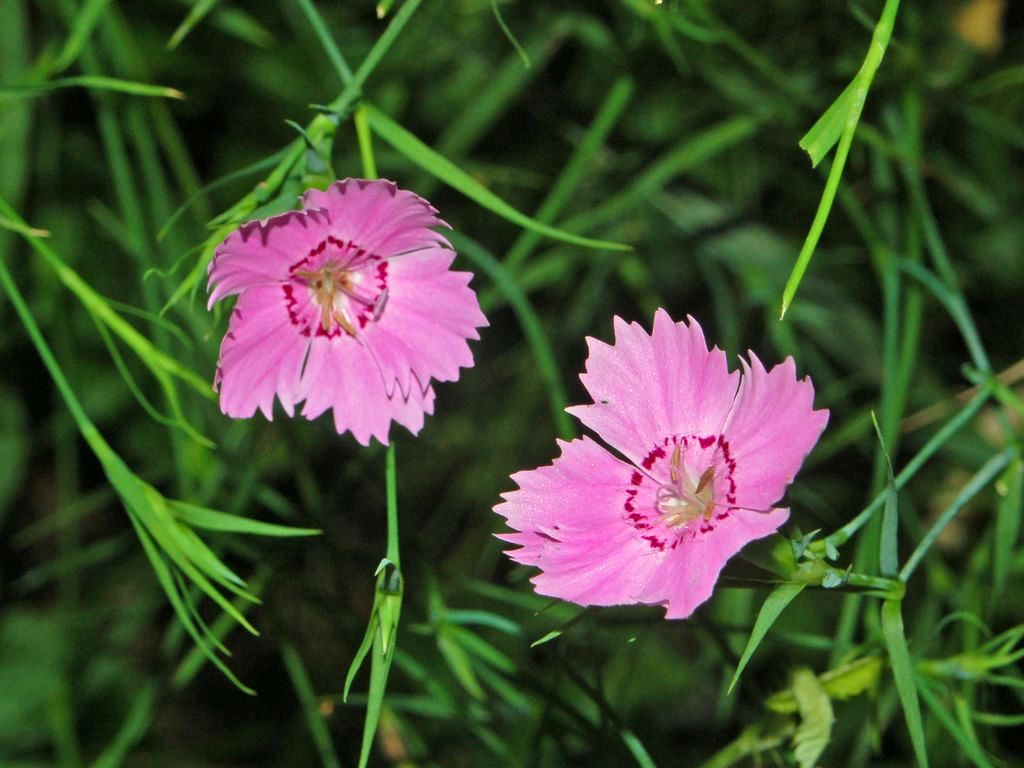
- Flowers of Dianthus seguieri

Scientific classification
- Kingdom: Plantae
- Clade: Tracheophytes
- Clade: Angiosperms
- Clade: Eudicots
- Order: Caryophyllales
- Family: Caryophyllaceae
- Genus: Dianthus
- Species: D. seguieri

Binomial name
- Dianthus seguieri Vill.

Synonyms
- Dianthus collinus Waldst. & Kit.; Dianthus seguieri subsp. italicus, Tutin

= Dianthus seguieri =

Species of flowering plant

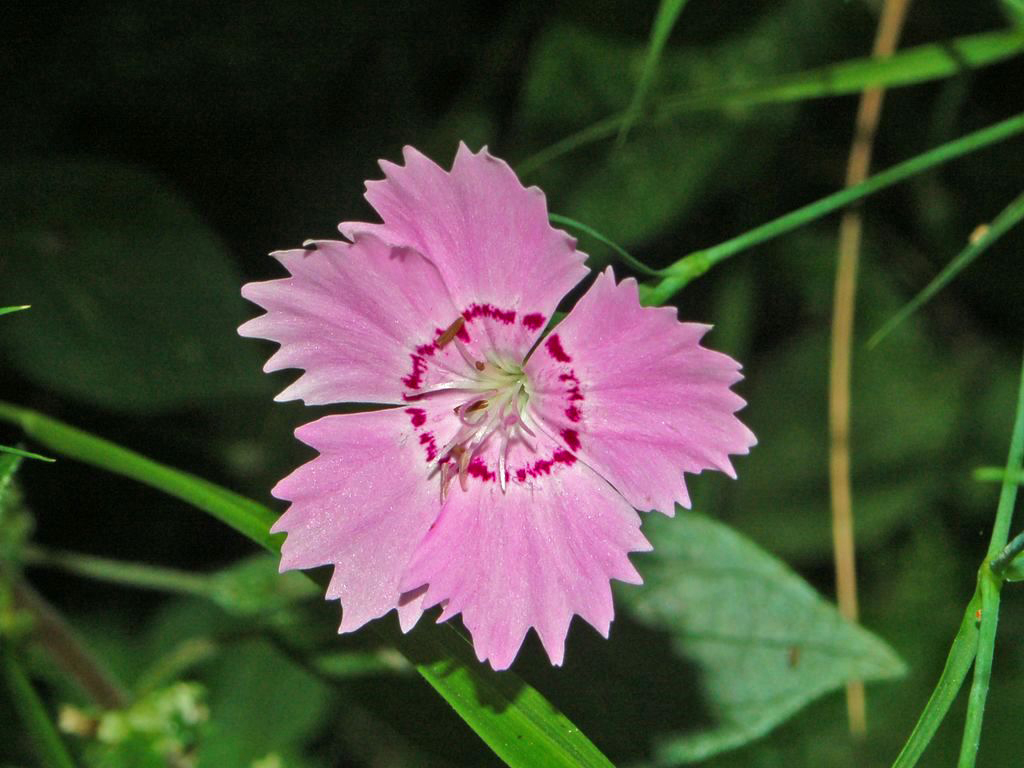
Close-up on a flower of Dianthus seguieri

Dianthus seguieri, common name Seguier's pink, is a herbaceous perennial plant of the genus Dianthus of the family Caryophyllaceae.

== Etymology ==
The genus name Dianthus derives from the Greek words Dios (meaning "from Zeus") and anthos ("flower"), while the species name seguieri honors the French botanist Jean-François Séguier (1733 – 1784).

== Description ==
Dianthus seguieri is a hemicryptophyte scapose plant reaching 25–60 centimetres (9.8–23.6 in) in height. This carnation has green lanceolate leaflets and pink flowers, with purple markings in the centre. The flowering period extends from June through September. The fruits are capsules with several brown seeds.

== Distribution ==
This species is present in southern and central Europe, mainly in Spain, France, Germany, Italy, Russia, and Switzerland.

== Habitat ==
Dianthus seguieri grows in dry meadows at an altitude of 100–1,000 metres (330–3,280 ft) above sea level.

== Gallery ==
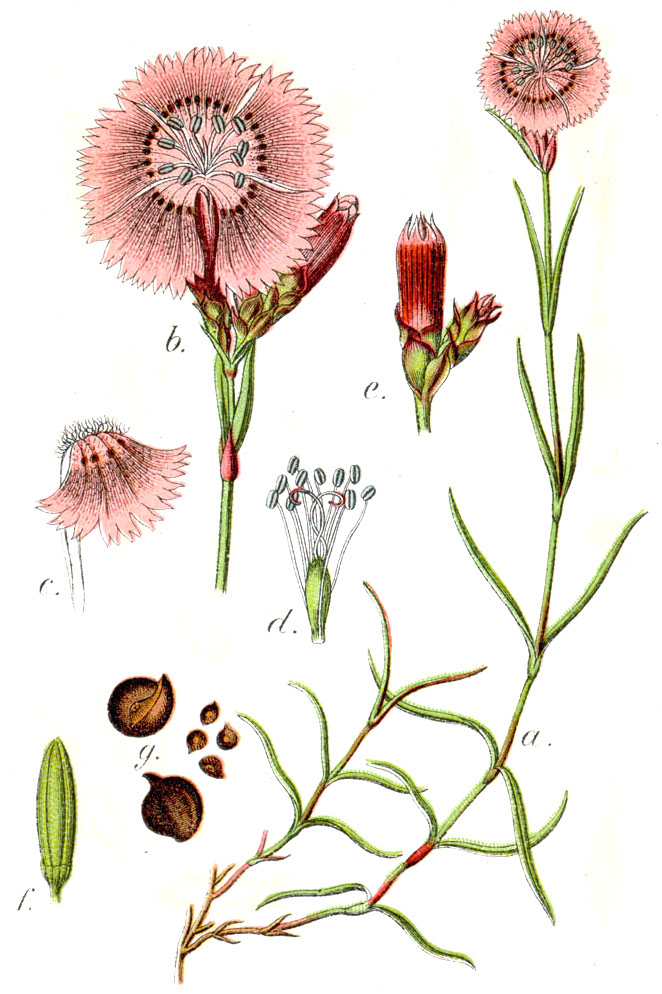
Figure from Deutschlands Flora in Abbildungen, 1796

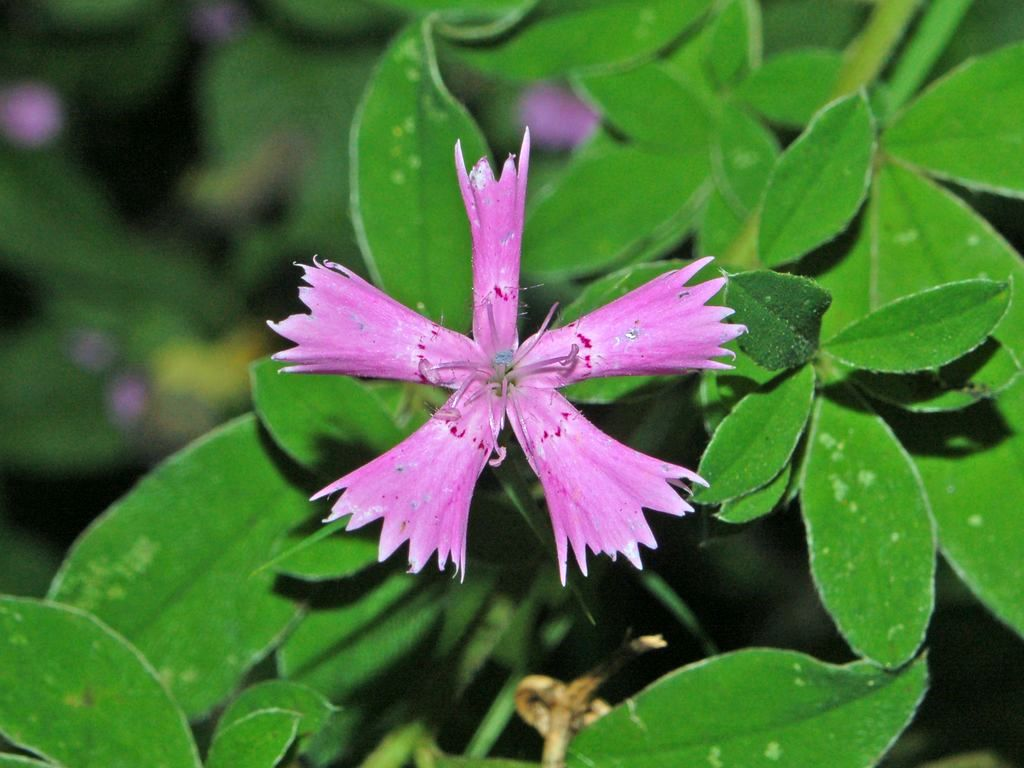
Flower of Dianthus seguieri

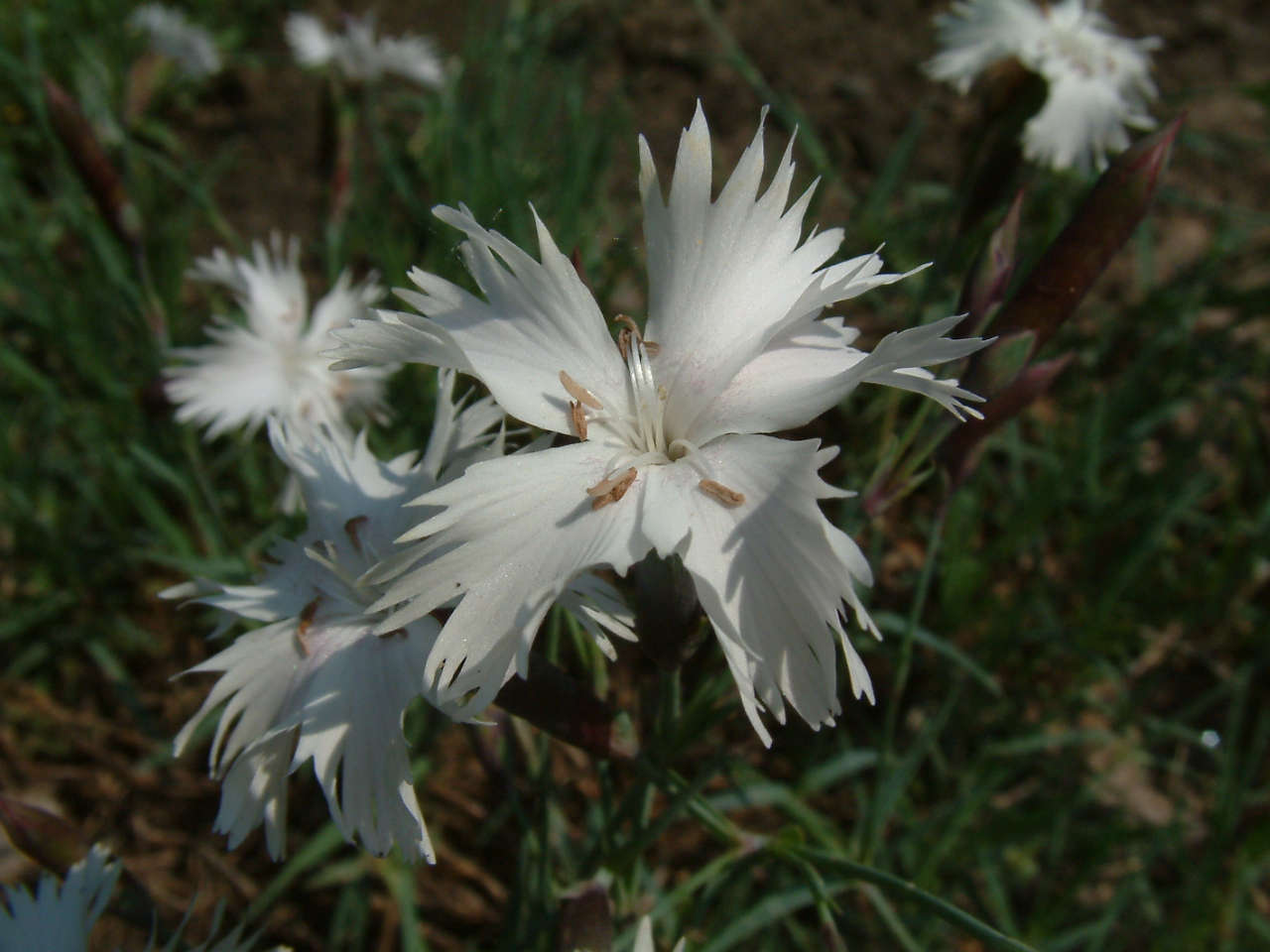
Flower of Dianthus seguieri subsp. glaber

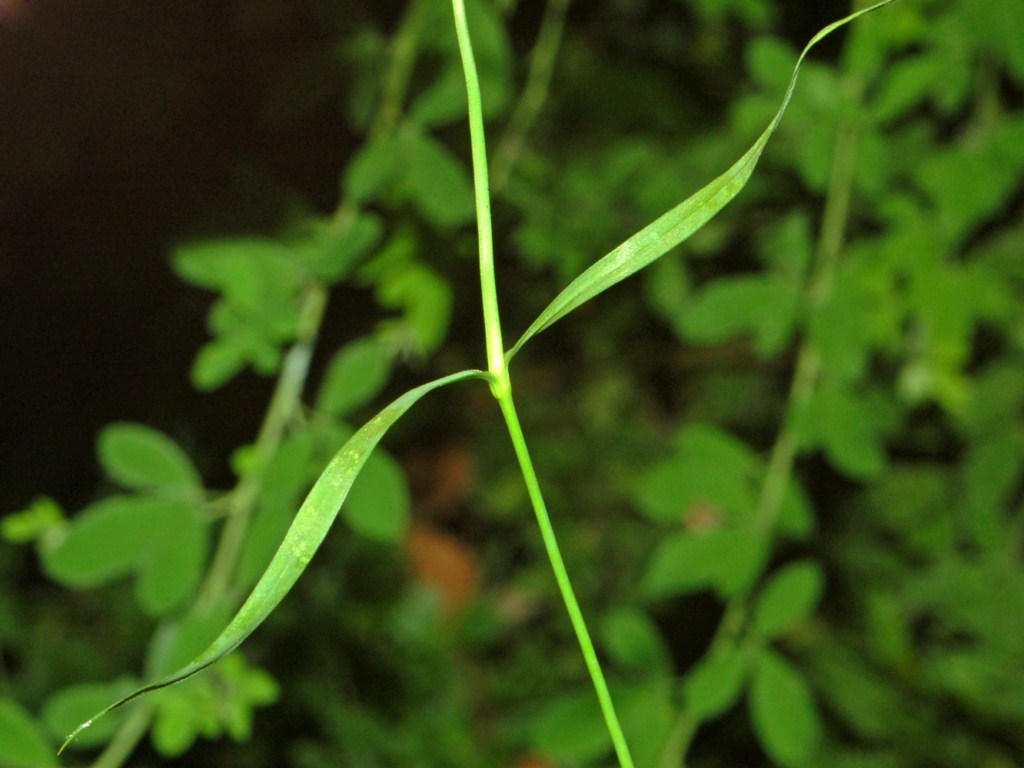
Leaves of Dianthus seguieri
