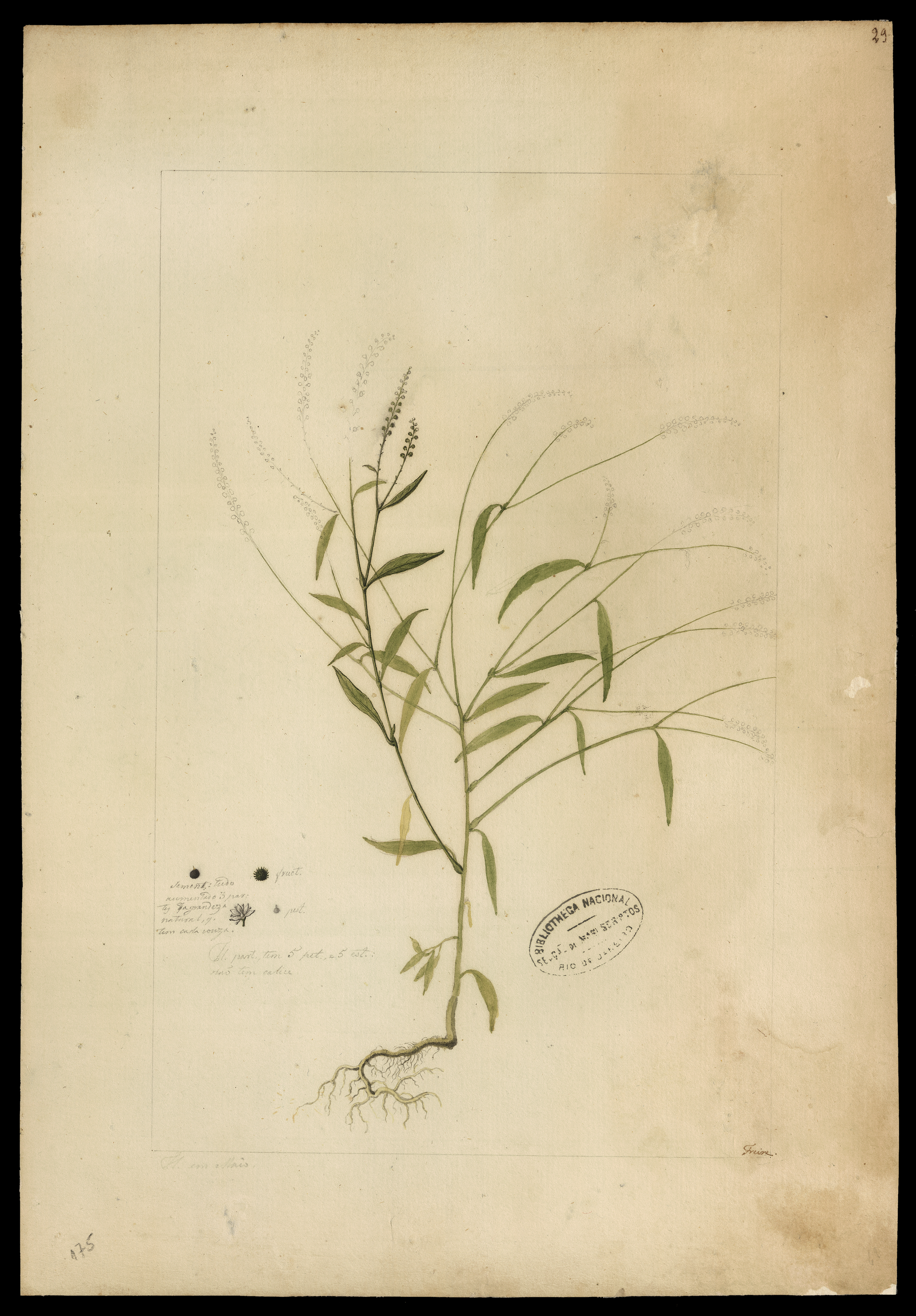
- Botanical illustration of Microtea glochidiata

Scientific classification
- Kingdom: Plantae
- Clade: Tracheophytes
- Clade: Angiosperms
- Clade: Eudicots
- Order: Caryophyllales
- Family: Microteaceae; Schäferhoff & Borsch
- Genus: Microtea; Sw.

Species
- 10; see text

Synonyms
- Ancistrocarpus Kunth (1817); Ceratococca Willd. (1820); Potamophila Schrank (1821); Schollera Rohr (1792), nom. illeg.

= Microtea =

Genus of flowering plants

Microtea, the jumby peppers, are a genus of flowering plants in the family Microteaceae, native to the Caribbean islands, Central America, and tropical South America.

== Species ==
Ten species are currently accepted.

- Microtea bahiensis Marchior. & J.C.Siqueira
- Microtea celosioides (Spreng.) Moq. ex Sennikov & Sukhor.
- Microtea debilis Sw. – weak jumby pepper
- Microtea glochidiata Moq.
- Microtea maypurensis (Kunth) G.Don
- Microtea papillosa Marchior. & J.C.Siqueira
- Microtea portoricensis Urb. – Puerto Rico jumby pepper
- Microtea scabrida Urb.
- Microtea sulcicaulis Chodat
- Microtea tenuifolia Moq.

Microtea was originally placed in the family Phytolaccaceae, but is now placed in its own family, the Microteaceae.
