= Gallesia =

Scientific classification
- Kingdom: Plantae
- Clade: Tracheophytes
- Clade: Angiosperms
- Clade: Eudicots
- Order: Caryophyllales
- Family: Petiveriaceae
- Genus: Gallesia; Casar.

Synonyms
- Crateva gorarema Vell.; Gallesia gorazema (Vell.) Moq.; Gallesia integrifolia var. ovata (O.C.Schmidt) Nowicke; Gallesia ovata O.C.Schmidt; Gallesia scorododendrum Casar.; Thouinia integrifolia Spreng.

Genus of plants

Gallesia is a monotypic genus of flowering plants belonging to the family Petiveriaceae. It only contains one species; Gallesia integrifolia (Spreng.) Harms

Its native range is western South America to Brazil. It is found in the countries of Bolivia, Brazil, Ecuador and Peru.

The genus name is in honour of Giorgio Gallesio (1772–1839), an Italian botanist and researcher, The specific epithet of 'integrifolia' is a portmanteaux word of 'integra' or 'integrum' meaning undivided or entire and also 'folia' meaning foliage. It was first described and published in Nov. Stirp. Bras. Vol.5 on page 43 in 1843.
