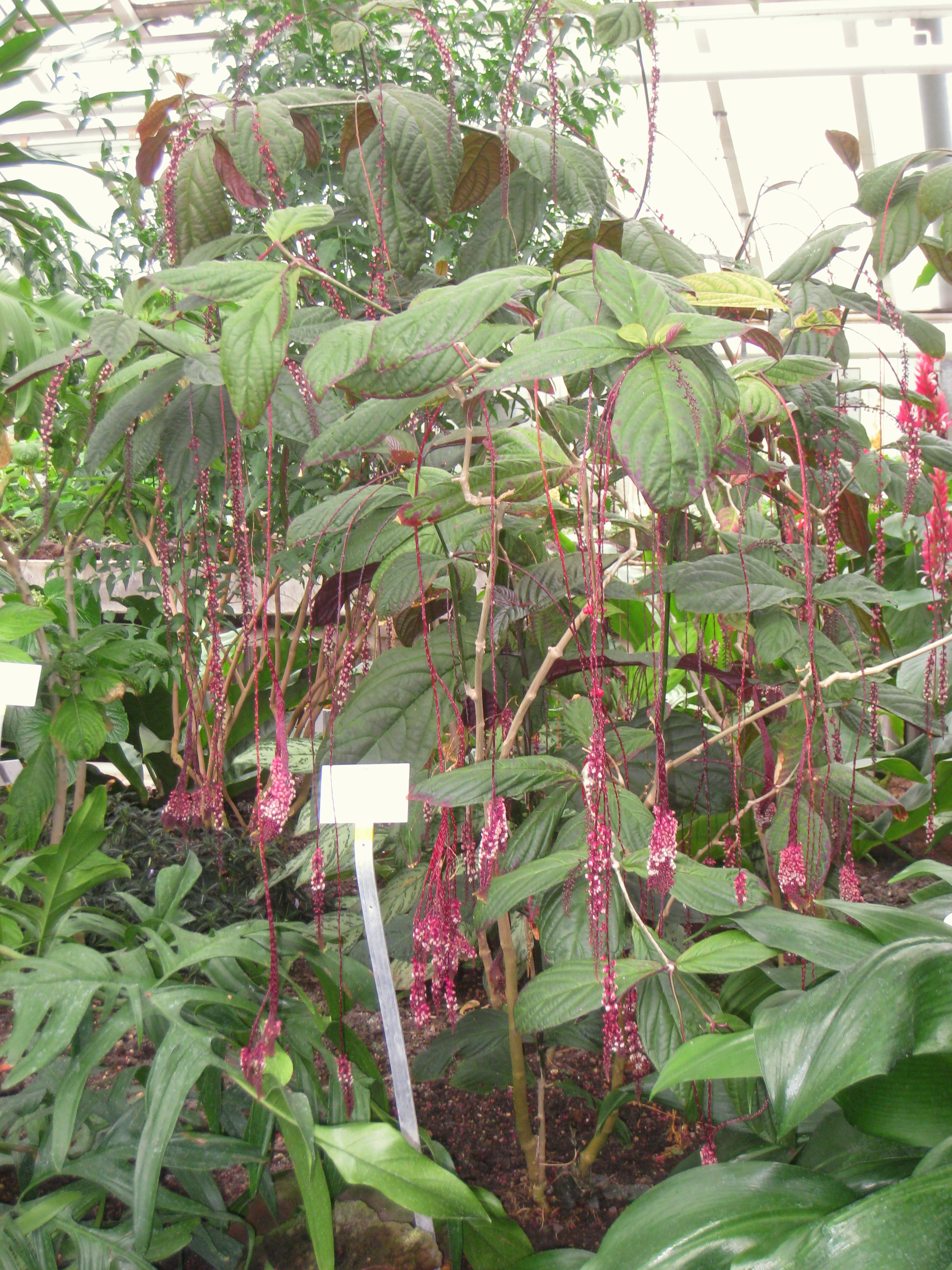
- Trichostigma peruvianum

Scientific classification
- Kingdom: Plantae
- Clade: Tracheophytes
- Clade: Angiosperms
- Clade: Eudicots
- Order: Caryophyllales
- Family: Petiveriaceae
- Genus: Trichostigma; A. Rich.

= Trichostigma =

Genus of flowering plants

Trichostigma is a genus of flowering plants in the family Petiveriaceae. It was formerly placed in the family Phytolaccaceae. It is native to the Caribbean islands, Central America, and South America. The genus consists of perennial shrubs or vines, with axillary or terminal racemes of 5-30 flowers.

== Species ==
- Trichostigma octandrum - Hoopvine
- Trichostigma peruvianum
- Trichostigma polyandrum
- Trichostigma rivinoides
