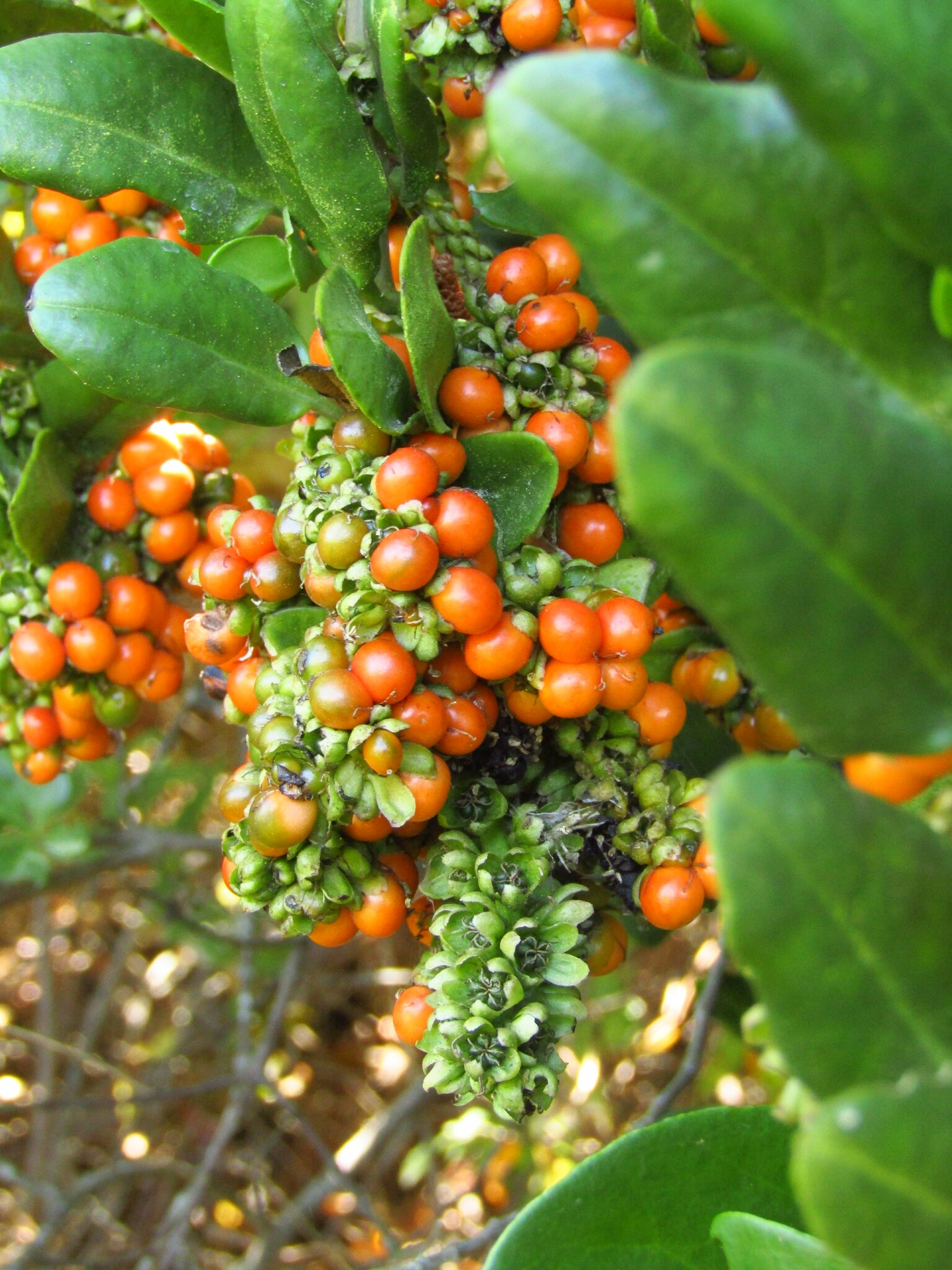
- Ercilla spicata

Scientific classification
- Kingdom: Plantae
- Clade: Embryophytes
- Clade: Tracheophytes
- Clade: Spermatophytes
- Clade: Angiosperms
- Clade: Eudicots
- Order: Caryophyllales
- Family: Phytolaccaceae
- Subfamily: Phytolaccoideae
- Genus: Ercilla; A.Juss

Type species
- Ercilla volubilis A.Juss

Synonyms
- Apodostachys Turcz.; Bridgesia Hook. & Arn.

= Ercilla (plant) =

Genus of flowering plants

Ercilla is a genus of plants in the pokeweed family Phytolaccaceae.

== Species ==
The genus Ercilla contains two species:

- Ercilla spicata (Vertero) Moq.
- Ercilla syncarpellata Nowicke
