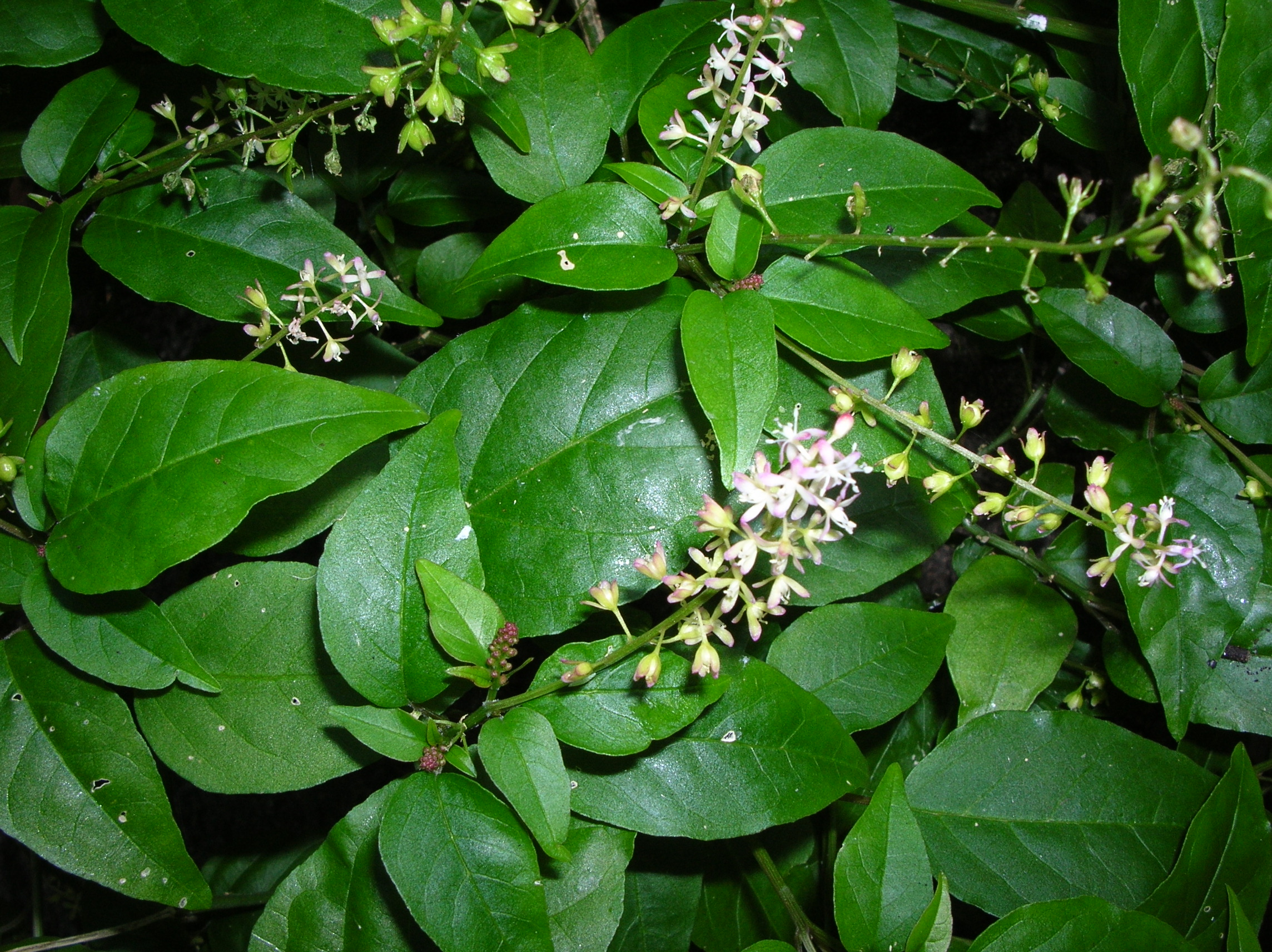
- Rivina humilis

Scientific classification
- Kingdom: Plantae
- Clade: Tracheophytes
- Clade: Angiosperms
- Clade: Eudicots
- Order: Caryophyllales
- Family: Petiveriaceae
- Genus: Rivina; L.

Type species
- Rivina humilis L.

Species
- See text

= Rivina =

Genus of flowering plants

Rivina is a genus of flowering plants in the family Petiveriaceae. The name honors German botanist Augustus Quirinus Rivinus (1652-1723).

== Selected species ==
- Rivina brasiliensis Nocca
- Rivina humilis L. – Pigeonberry (American tropics and subtropics)

=== Formerly placed here ===
- Trichostigma octandrum (L.) H.Walter (as R. octandra L.)
