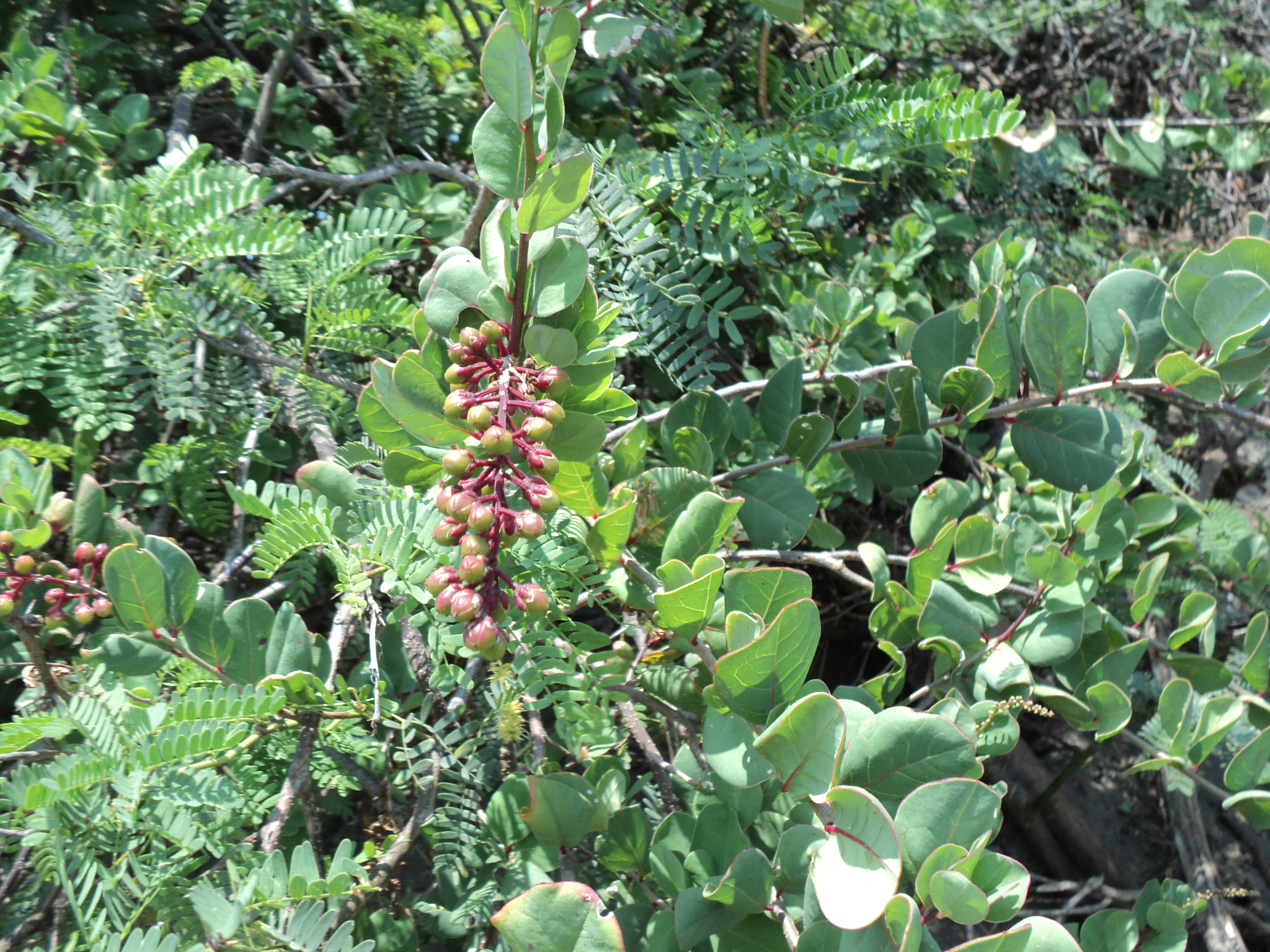
- Stegnosperma cubense

Scientific classification
- Kingdom: Plantae
- Clade: Tracheophytes
- Clade: Angiosperms
- Clade: Eudicots
- Order: Caryophyllales
- Family: Stegnospermataceae; Nakai
- Genus: Stegnosperma; Benth.

Species
- Stegnosperma cubense - Cuban tangle; Stegnosperma halimifolium; Stegnosperma sanchezii; Stegnosperma watsonii

= Stegnosperma =

Genus of flowering plants

Stegnosperma is a genus of flowering plants, consisting of three species of woody plants, native to the Caribbean, Central America, and the Sonoran Desert. These are shrubs or lianas, with anomalous secondary thickening in mature stems, by successive cambia.

== Characteristics ==
Leaves are alternate, entire, 2–5 cm in length, tapering at both ends. Flowers are small (5–8 mm), five-merous, with white petal-like sepals, and a superior ovary. They are arranged in short racemes, usually no more than 10 cm long, shorter in S. watsonii. The fruit is a capsule 5–8 mm in diameter: it contains small (2–3 mm) black seeds with a conspicuous reddish aril.

The genus has commonly been treated as belonging to the family Phytolaccaceae, but the APG system and APG II system, of 2003, regard it as the sole genus of its own family, the Stegnospermataceae and assign it to the order Caryophyllales in the clade core eudicots

Turner et al. suggest that S. halimifolium Bentham and S. watsonii D.J. Rogers are actually the same species, observing that specimens from the gulf coast of Sonora have intermediate characteristics. Whether one species or two, they are locally common all along the Gulf of California, where they are found on the coastal strand and some inland washes, always at low elevations (less than 600 m).

== Anatomy ==
Stem and root anatomy was originally thought to be normal, but this was due to the small diameter of herbarium specimens examined by early researchers. Anomalous secondary thickening by successive cambia has been described in detail within mature stems and roots.

== Uses ==
In traditional medicine, curanderas use an extract of the root as a part of the treatment for rabies due to its emetic properties. Jiménez-Estrada et al. list Stegnosperma extract for treatment of headache, snakebite, and rabies. They provide an analysis of the antioxidant and antiproliferative activity of S. halimifolium.
