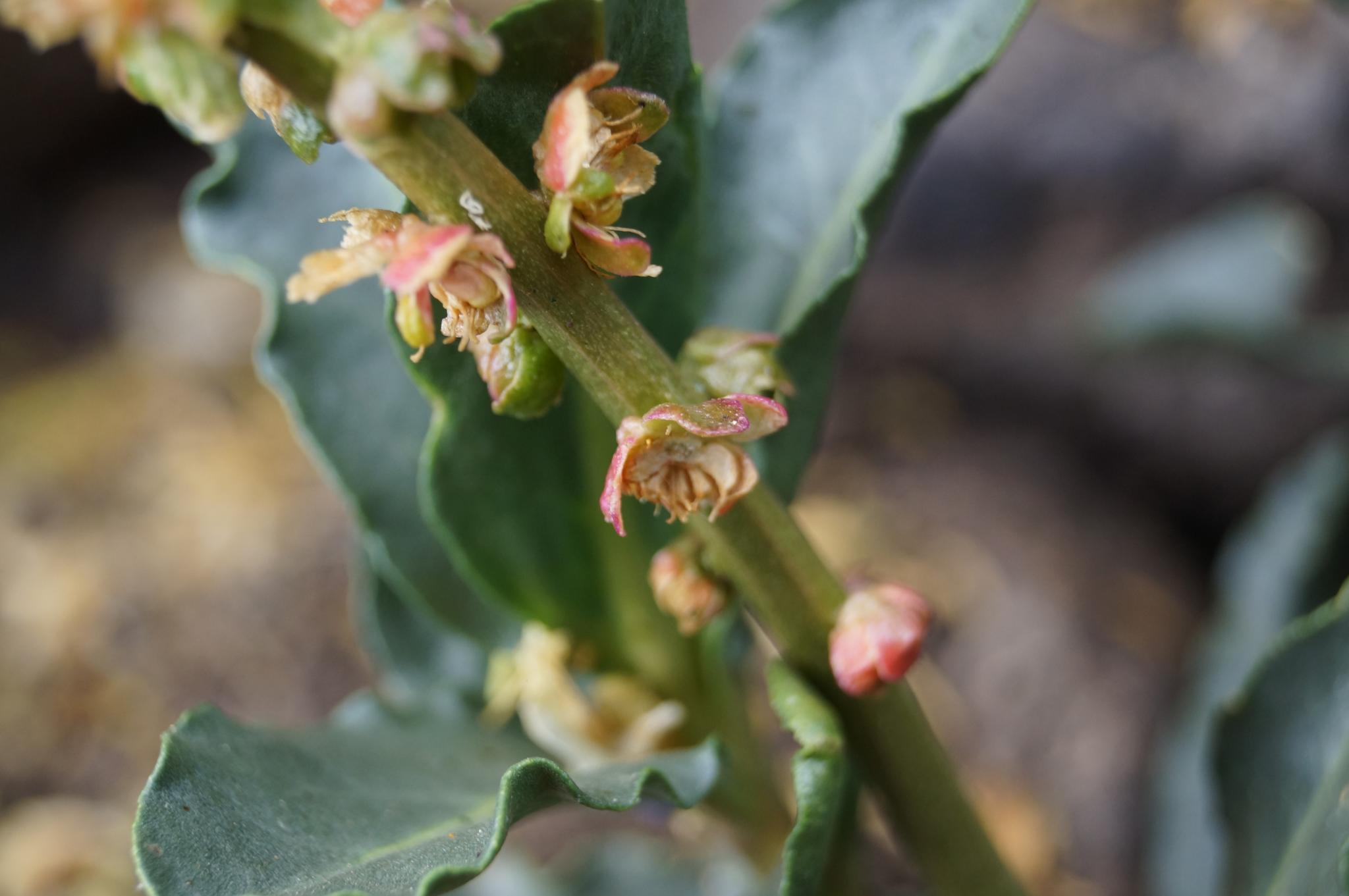
- Anisomeria coriacea

Scientific classification
- Kingdom: Plantae
- Clade: Embryophytes
- Clade: Tracheophytes
- Clade: Spermatophytes
- Clade: Angiosperms
- Clade: Eudicots
- Order: Caryophyllales
- Family: Phytolaccaceae
- Subfamily: Phytolaccoideae
- Genus: Anisomeria; D.Don

Type species
- Anisomeria coriacea D.Don

Species
- Anisomeria bistrata; Anisomeria coriacea; Anisomeria littoralis

= Anisomeria (plant) =

Genus of flowering plants

Anisomeria is a genus of plants in Phytolaccaceae containing three species, Anisomeria bistrata, Anisomeria coriacea, and Anisomeria littoralis.
