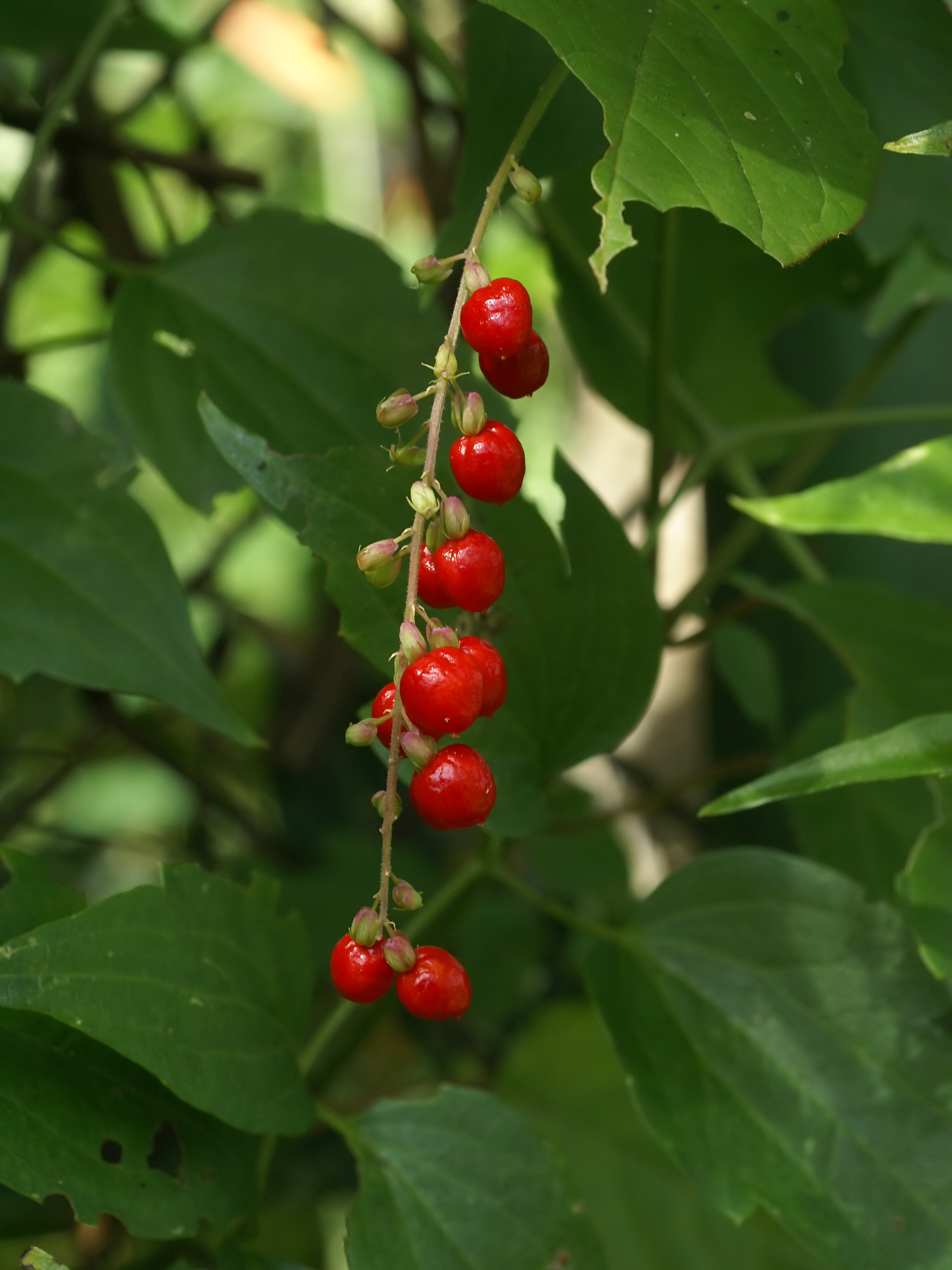

Scientific classification
- Kingdom: Plantae
- Clade: Tracheophytes
- Clade: Angiosperms
- Clade: Eudicots
- Order: Caryophyllales
- Family: Petiveriaceae
- Genus: Rivina
- Species: R. humilis

Binomial name
- Rivina humilis L.

Synonyms
- Rivina laevis L.

= Rivina humilis =

Species of flowering plant

Rivina humilis is a species of flowering plant in the family Petiveriaceae. It was formerly placed in the pokeweed family, Phytolaccaceae. It can be found in the southern United States, the Caribbean, Central America, and tropical South America. Common names include dogblood, pigeonberry, rougeplant, baby peppers, bloodberry, and coralito. The specific epithet means "dwarfish" or "lowly" in Latin, referring to the plant's short stature.

== Description ==
Pigeonberry is an erect, vine-like herb, reaching a height of 0.4–2 m (1.3–6.6 ft). The leaves of this evergreen perennial are up to 15 cm (5.9 in) long and 9 cm (3.5 in) wide, with a petiole 1–11 cm (0.39–4.33 in) in length. Flowers are on racemes 4–15 cm (1.6–5.9 in) long with a peduncle 1–5 cm (0.39–1.97 in) in length and pedicels 2–8 mm (0.079–0.315 in) long. Sepals are 1.5–3.5 mm (0.059–0.138 in) in length and white or green to pink or purplish. The fruit is a glossy, bright red berry 2.5–5 mm (0.098–0.197 in) in diameter.

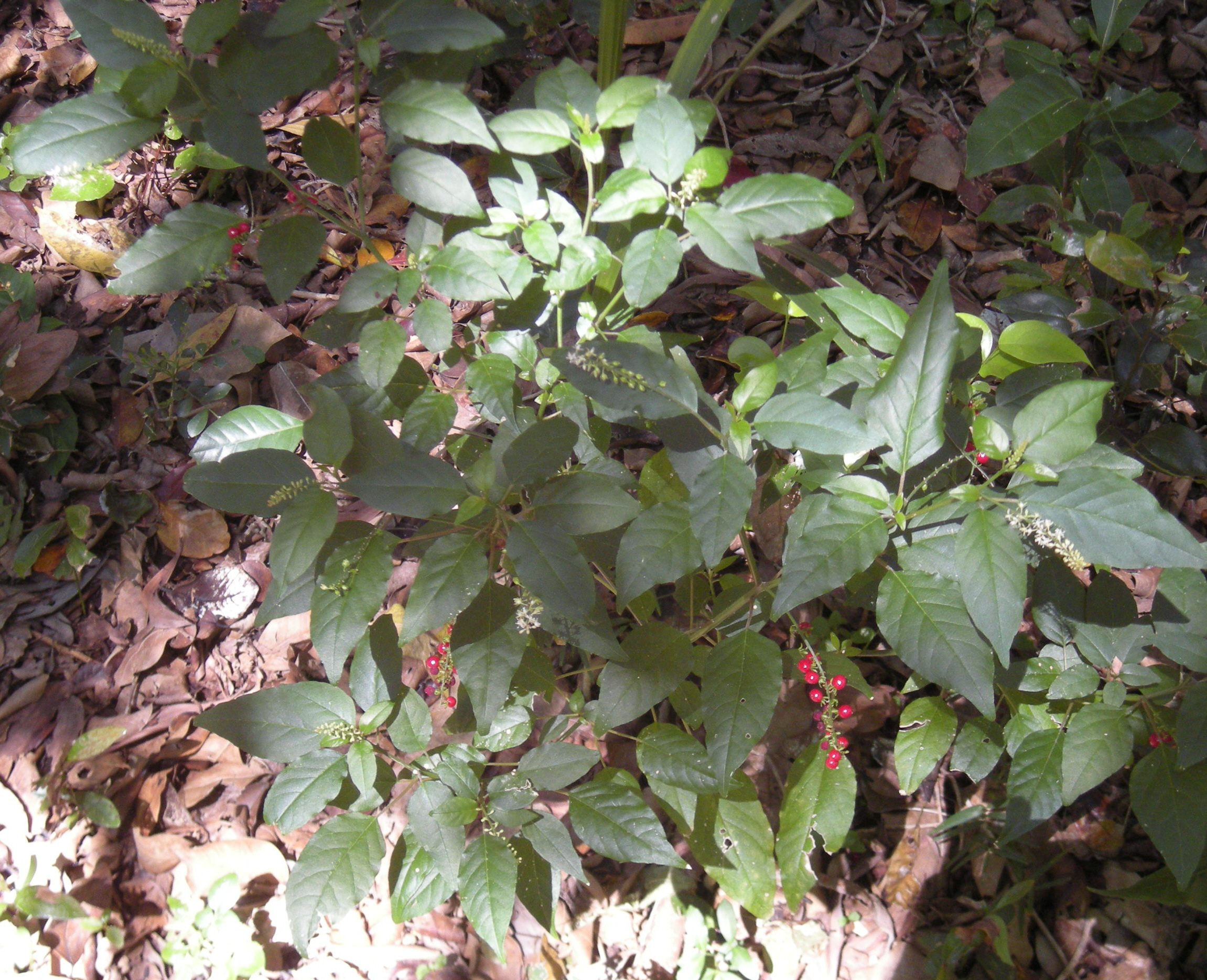
Rivina humilis plant with fruit and flowers.

== Habitat ==
Rivina humilis can be found in forests, thickets, shell middens, hammocks, roadsides, and disturbed areas at elevations from sea level to 1,700 m (5,600 ft). It requires less than partial sun and is tolerant of full shade. It is also tolerant of salt spray and saline soils.

It is considered invasive in New Caledonia, where it was likely introduced in 1900. It is considered a weed in Queensland, Australia where it has naturalised, and is also naturalised on Cocos Islands, Réunion, Norfolk Island, Fiji, Tonga, French Polynesia, Hawaii, India and the Galapagos Islands.

== Uses ==
Pigeonberry is cultivated as an ornamental in warm regions throughout the world and is valued as a shade-tolerant groundcover. It is also grown as a houseplant and in greenhouses.

The juice made from the berries was used as a dye and ink at one time. The berries contain a pigment known as rivianin or rivinianin, which has the IUPAC name 5-O-β-D-Glucopyranoside, 3-sulfate, CAS number 58115-21-2, and molecular formula C_{24}H_{26}N_{2}O_{16}S. It is very similar to betanin, the pigment found in beets. The fruit also contains the betaxanthin humilixanthin.

The juice of the berries have been tested in male rats and are reported to be safe to consume.

== Ecology ==
R. humilis is a host plant for the caterpillars of Goodson's greenstreak (Cyanophrys goodsoni)
