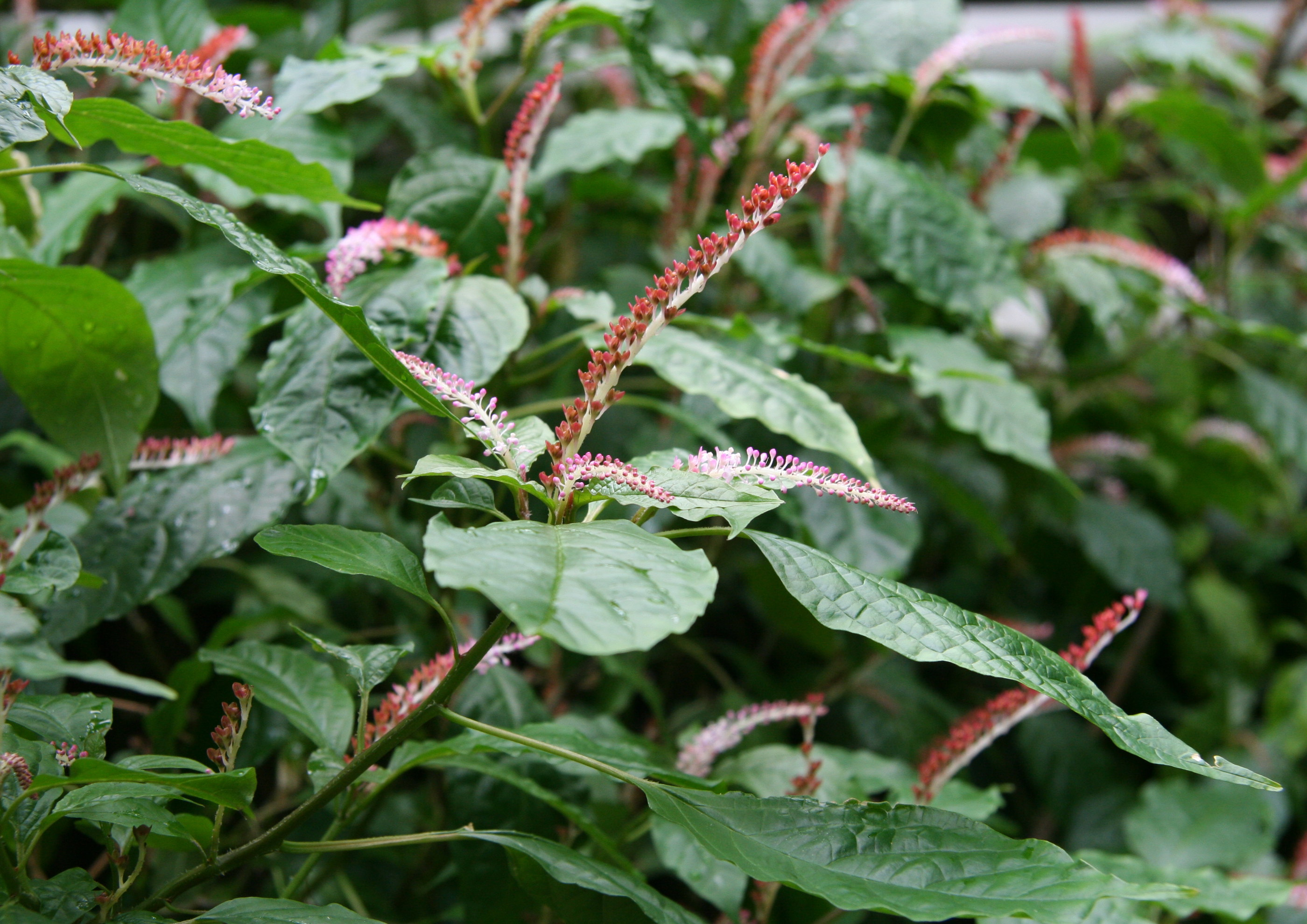
- Hilleria latifolia

Scientific classification
- Kingdom: Plantae
- Clade: Embryophytes
- Clade: Tracheophytes
- Clade: Spermatophytes
- Clade: Angiosperms
- Clade: Eudicots
- Order: Caryophyllales
- Family: Petiveriaceae
- Genus: Hilleria; Vell.

Synonyms
- Mancoa Raf.; Mohlana Mart.

= Hilleria =

Genus of plants

Hilleria is a genus of flowering plants belonging to the family Petiveriaceae.

Its native range is southern tropical America. It is found in the countries of Argentina, Bolivia, Brazil, Colombia, Ecuador, Paraguay, Peru and Venezuela. It has been introduced to large parts of Africa including; Angola, Benin, Burundi, Cameroon, Central African Republic, Ethiopia, Gabon, Ghana, Ivory Coast, Kenya, KwaZulu-Natal (region of South Africa), Liberia, Madagascar, Mauritius, Mozambique, Nigeria, Rwanda, Réunion, Sri Lanka, Sudan, Tanzania, Togo, Uganda and Zaire.

The genus name of Hilleria is in honour of Matthaeus Hiller (1646–1725), a German clergyman, professor and linguist in Tübingen, Holland. It was first described and published in Fl. Flumin. on page 47 in 1829.

Known species, according to Kew:

- Hilleria latifolia (Lam.) H.Walter
- Hilleria longifolia Heimerl
- Hilleria secunda (Ruiz & Pav.) Kuntze
