= Seguieria =

Scientific classification
- Kingdom: Plantae
- Clade: Tracheophytes
- Clade: Angiosperms
- Clade: Eudicots
- Order: Caryophyllales
- Family: Petiveriaceae
- Genus: Seguieria; Loefl.

Synonyms
- Albertokuntzea Kuntze

Genus of flowering plants

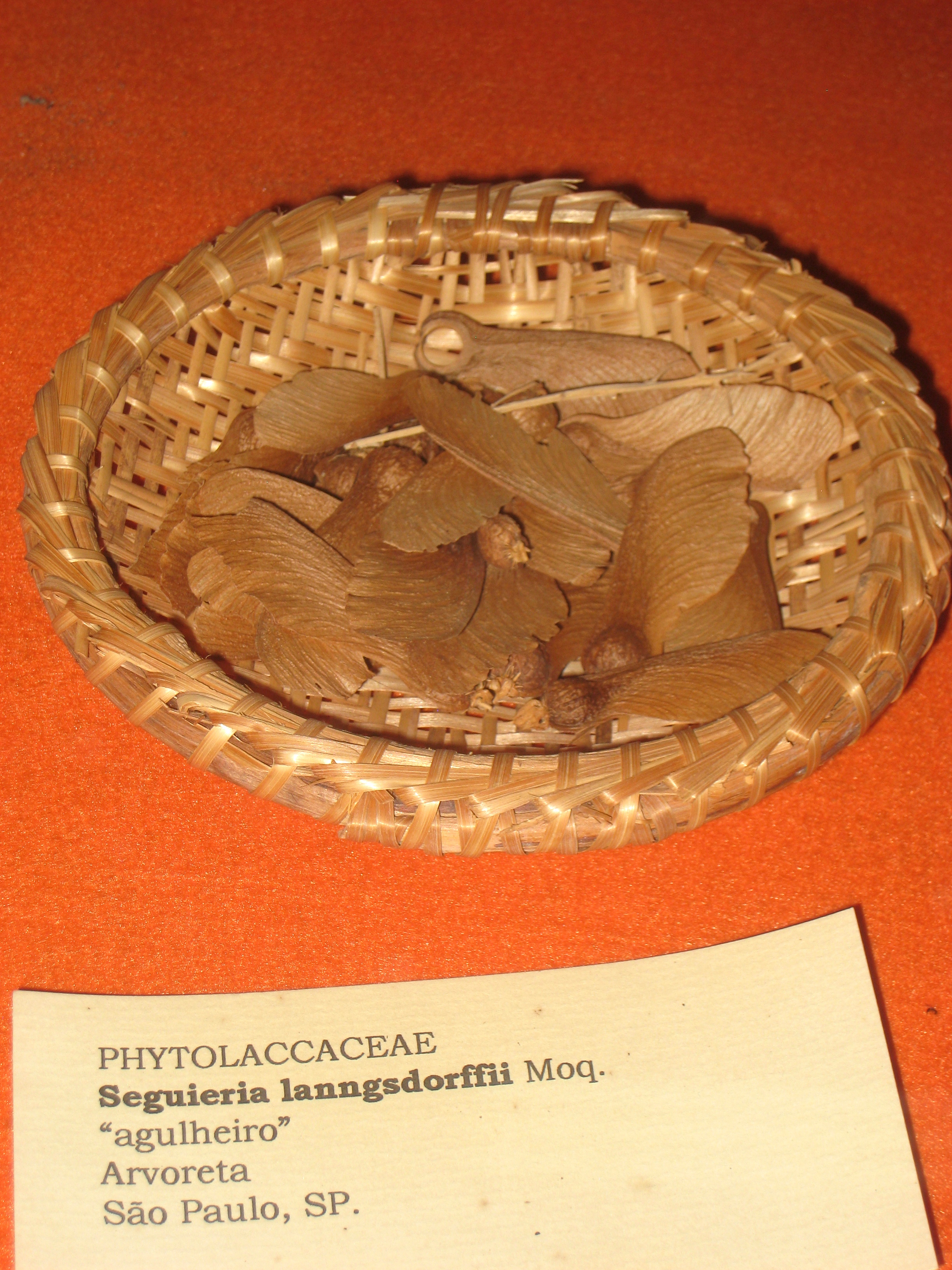
Seguieria langsdorffii specimen

Seguieria is a genus of flowering plants belonging to the family Petiveriaceae.

Its native range is southern America. It is found in Argentina, Bolivia, Brazil (northern, north-east, southern, south-east and west-central), Colombia, Costa Rica, Ecuador, French Guiana, Guyana, Panamá, Paraguay, Peru, Suriname, Trinidad, Tobago and Venezuela.

The genus name of Seguieria is in honour of Jean-François Séguier (1703–1784), a French archaeologist, epigraphist, astronomer and botanist from Nîmes. It was first described and published in Iter Hispan. on page 191 in 1758.

== Known species ==
According to Kew:

- Seguieria aculeata Jacq.
- Seguieria americana L.
- Seguieria brevithyrsa H.Walter
- Seguieria langsdorffii Moq.
- Seguieria macrophylla Benth.
- Seguieria paraguayensis Morong
