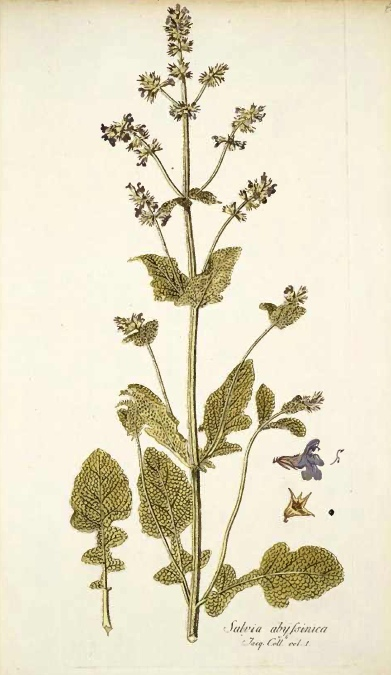

Scientific classification
- Kingdom: Plantae
- Clade: Tracheophytes
- Clade: Angiosperms
- Clade: Eudicots
- Clade: Asterids
- Order: Lamiales
- Family: Lamiaceae
- Genus: Salvia
- Species: S. nilotica

Binomial name
- Salvia nilotica Jacq.

= Salvia nilotica =

Species of shrub

Salvia nilotica is a perennial shrub growing in the eastern African highlands from Ethiopia to Zimbabwe, between 900 and 3,600 m (3,000 and 11,800 ft) elevation. It has many creeping rhizomes and stems about 60–90 cm (24–35 in) tall. The small flowers, in whorls of 6–8, range from purple to rose to white.
