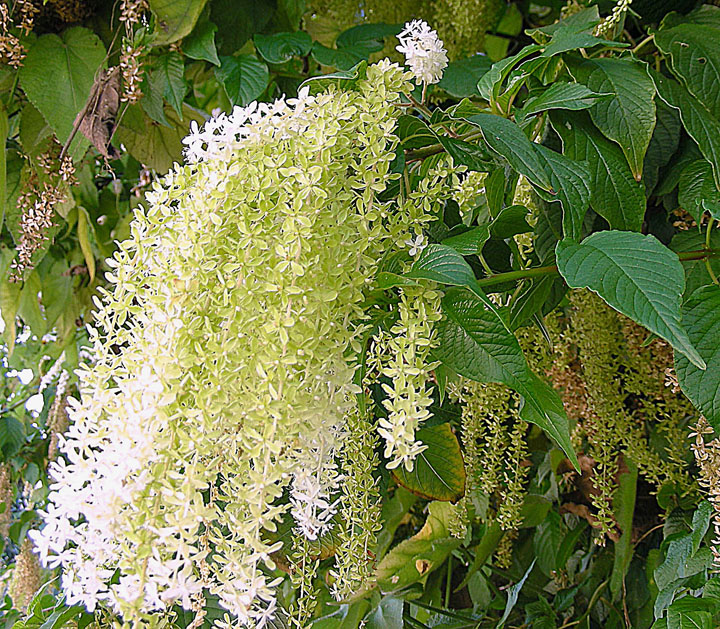

Scientific classification
- Kingdom: Plantae
- Clade: Tracheophytes
- Clade: Angiosperms
- Clade: Eudicots
- Order: Caryophyllales
- Family: Petiveriaceae
- Genus: Ledenbergia; Klotzsch ex Moq.

Synonyms
- Flueckigera Kuntze

= Ledenbergia =

Genus of flowering plant

Ledenbergia is a genus of flowering plants belonging to the family Petiveriaceae.

Its native range is Mexico to southern Tropical America. It is found in Colombia, Costa Rica, Ecuador, El Salvador, Guatemala, Mexico, Nicaragua, Peru and Venezuela.

The genus name of Ledenbergia is in honour of Johann Philipp von Ladenberg (1769–1847), a Prussian lawyer who founded an educational institute for the sons of underprivileged forest officials. It was first described and published in A.P.de Candolle, Prodr. Vol.13 (Series 2) on page 14 in 1849.

== Known species ==
According to Kew:

- Ledenbergia macrantha Standl.
- Ledenbergia peruviana O.C.Schmidt
- Ledenbergia seguierioides Klotzsch ex Moq.
