= Monococcus =

Scientific classification
- Kingdom: Plantae
- Clade: Embryophytes
- Clade: Tracheophytes
- Clade: Spermatophytes
- Clade: Angiosperms
- Clade: Eudicots
- Order: Caryophyllales
- Family: Petiveriaceae
- Genus: Monococcus; F.Muell.
- Species: M. echinophorus

Binomial name
- Monococcus echinophorus F.Muell.

Genus of plants

Monococcus is a monotypic genus of flowering plants belonging to the family Petiveriaceae. The only species is Monococcus echinophorus.

Its native range is Eastern Australia (Queensland and New South Wales) to the Southwestern Pacific (New Caledonia and Vanuatu).
