= Joan W. Nowicke =

American botanist

- Born: 1938
- Occupation: Botanist, photographer, palynologist, botanical collector
- Employer: Smithsonian Institution

Joan W. Nowicke (born 1938) is an American botanist from St. Louis, Missouri. She worked 27 years for the Smithsonian Institution, between 1972 and 1999, in the Department of Botany, from the National Museum of Natural History. Nowicke is a global reference as a palynologist, mainly due to her specialization in pollen morphology and its relationship with systematics, in addition to her extensive work in the area of Caryophyllales palynotaxonomy. She co-authored a 1984 paper entitled, "Yellow rain - a palynological analysis". At the time, yellow rain was thought to be a form of toxin warfare by the Soviet Union. Her paper stated that the yellow rain of South-East Asia contained a large amount of pollen leading her to gain international recognition.

In 1989, botanists J.Martínez & J.A.McDonald published Nowickea, a genus of flowering plants from Mexico, belonging to the family Phytolaccaceae and named in her honour.

The standard author abbreviation Nowicke is used to indicate this person as the author when citing a botanical name.

== See also ==
- Timeline of women in science
