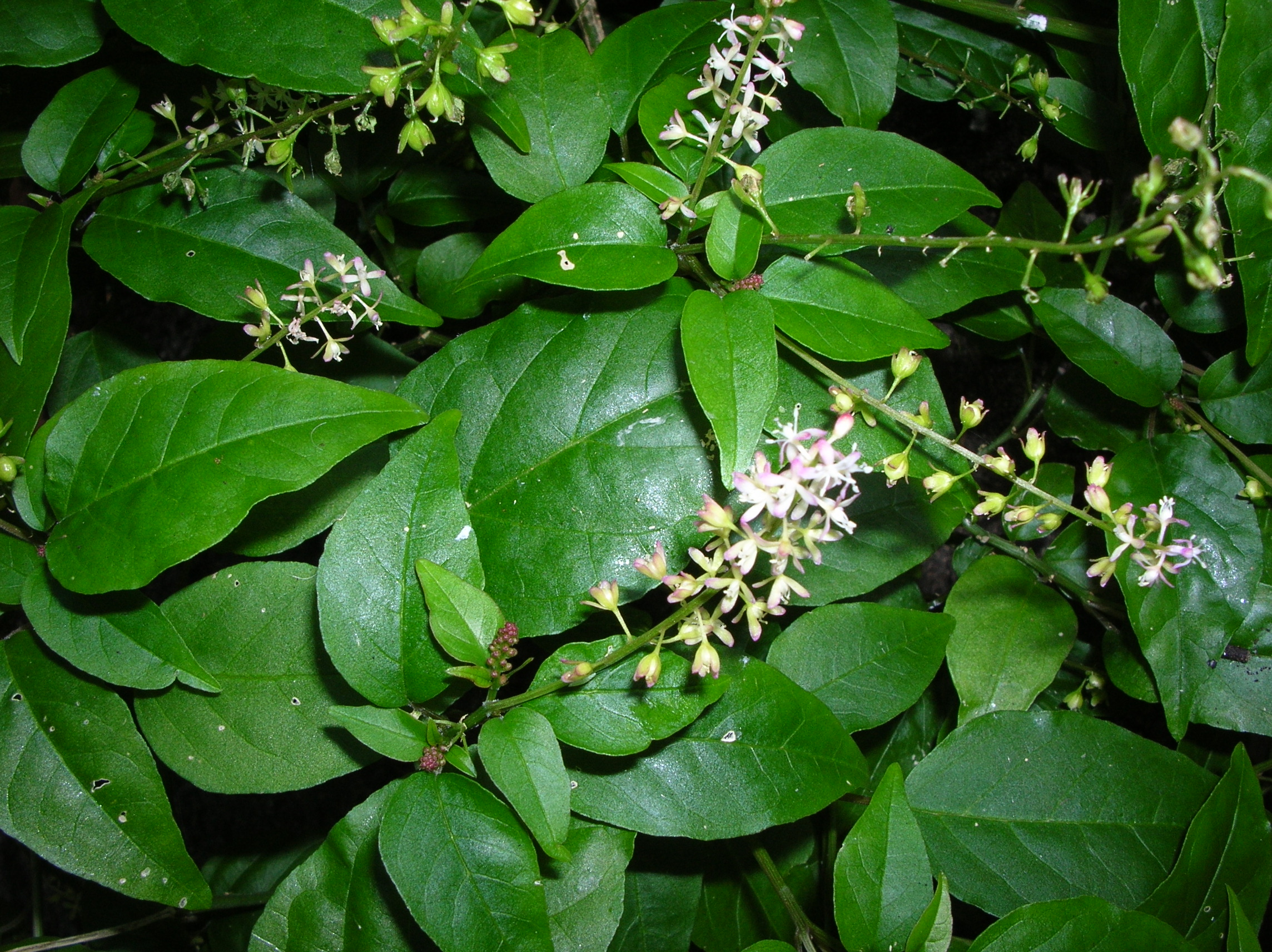
- Rivina humilis

Scientific classification
- Kingdom: Plantae
- Clade: Tracheophytes
- Clade: Angiosperms
- Clade: Eudicots
- Order: Caryophyllales
- Family: Petiveriaceae; C.Agardh

Genera
- Gallesia; Hilleria; Ledenbergia; Monococcus; Petiveria; Rivina; Schindleria; Seguieria; Trichostigma

Synonyms
- Hilleriaceae; Rivinaceae

= Petiveriaceae =

Family of flowering plants

Petiveriaceae is a family of flowering plants formerly included as subfamily Rivinoideae in Phytolaccaceae. The family comprises nine genera, with about 20 known species.

== Genera ==
Petiveriaceae includes the following genera:

- Gallesia Casar.
- Hilleria Vell.
- Ledenbergia Klotzsch ex Moq.
- Monococcus F.Muell.
- Petiveria L.
- Rivina L.
- Schindleria H.Walter
- Seguieria Loefl.
- Trichostigma A.Rich.
