= List of basal superasterid families =

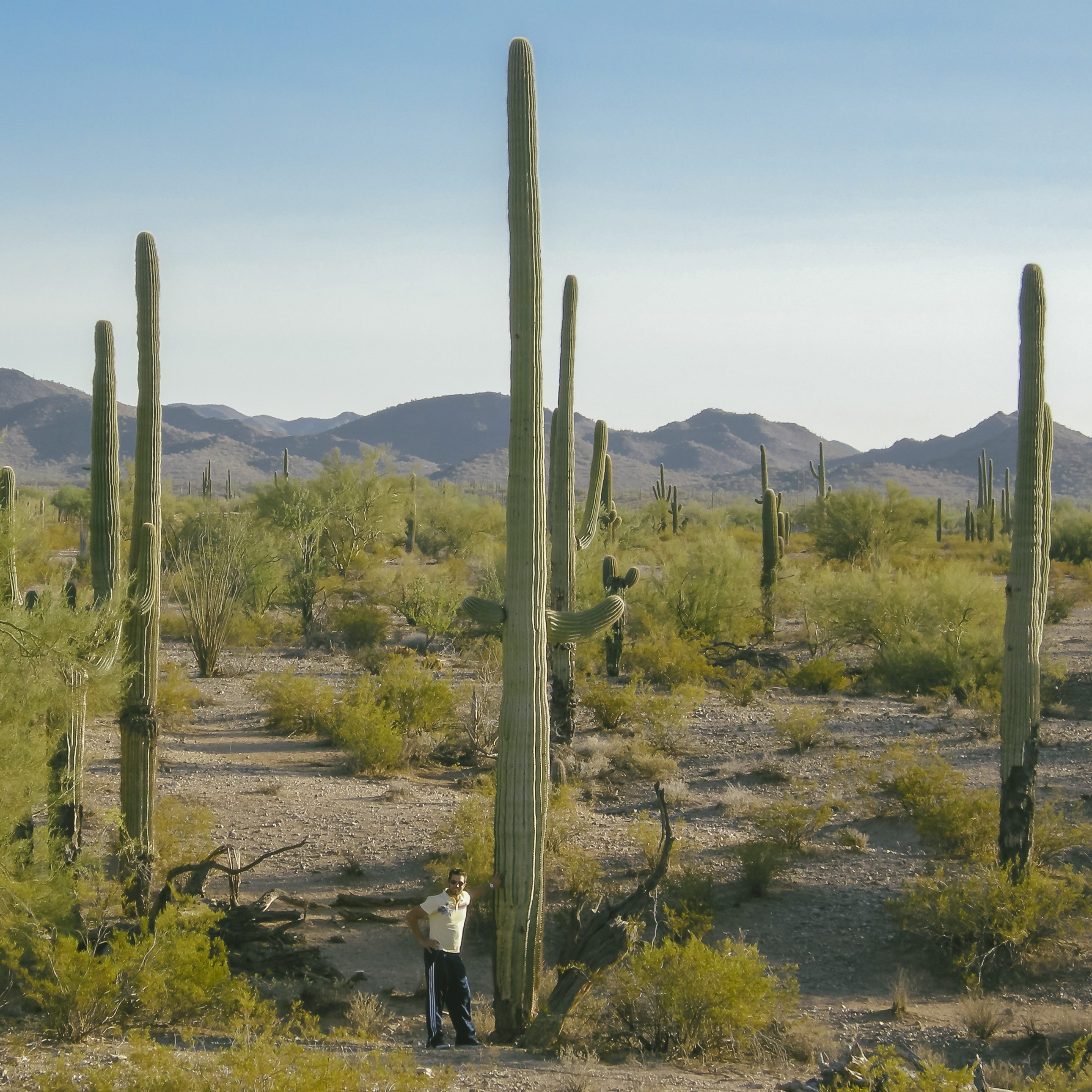
A man leaning on a Saguaro cactus near Tucson, Arizona, US

The basal superasterids are three orders of flowering plants – Caryophyllales, Santalales and Berberidopsidales – that belong to the superasterids. (Note: The taxonomy (classification) in this list follows Plants of the World (2017) and the fourth Angiosperm Phylogeny Group system. Total counts of genera for each family come from Plants of the World Online (POWO). (See the POWO license.) Extinct taxa are not included.) They include 47 families of woody and non-woody plants, cactuses and other succulents, and plants that grow in soil, in water and on other plants.

The spinach family includes sugar beets, which account for a fifth of the world's sugar consumption. Opuntia ficus-indica, a prickly pear species, is the most common food crop of the cactuses. Carnations are cultivated for their oils and for the cut-flower trade. Sundews, Venus flytraps and the aquatic Aldrovanda all have leaves that surround, trap and digest insects and other small animals. Nepenthes catches its prey with slippery pitchers of water and digestive juices. The garden ornamental Lewisia can survive two-year droughts. Jojoba oil, widely used in cosmetics and pharmaceuticals, is similar to the oils produced by human skin glands.

== Glossary ==
From the glossary of botanical terms:

- annual: a plant species that completes its life cycle within a single year or growing season
- basal: attached close to the base (of a plant or an evolutionary tree diagram)
- climber: a vine that leans on, twines around or clings to other plants for vertical support
- herbaceous: not woody; usually green and soft in texture
- perennial: not an annual or biennial
- scale: a reduced leaf or a flattened outgrowth
- succulent (adjective): juicy or fleshy
- unisexual: of one sex; bearing only male or only female reproductive organs
- woody: hard and lignified; not herbaceous

The APG IV system is the fourth in a series of plant taxonomies from the Angiosperm Phylogeny Group. In this system, the superasterids (named for the asters) account for more than a third of all flowering plant species. Caryophyllales, Santalales and Berberidopsidales are basal within the superasterids. Caryophyllales species characteristically have perisperm (a source of nutrition for the embryo), campylotropous (rotated) ovules, and roots that lack symbiotic fungal relationships. The small order Berberidopsidales (just four species) may be the earliest-diverging superasterid order. In Santalales, an order of parasitic plants, the relationships between the families are not completely understood.

== Families ==
Families
Family and a common name (Note: Each family's formal name ends in the Latin suffix -aceae and is derived from the name of a genus that is or once was part of the family.)	Type genus and etymology (Note: Some plants were named for naturalists (unless otherwise noted).)	Total genera; global distribution	Description and uses	Order	Type genus images
Achatocarpaceae (snake-eyes family)	Achatocarpus, from Greek for "agate fruit"	2 genera, from southern North America to Argentina	Small trees and shrubs, many with unisexual flowers and pointed branchlets and some with thorns	Caryophyllales	Three Achatocarpus species
Aextoxicaceae (olivillo family)	Aextoxicon, from Greek for "goat poison"	1 genus, in Chile and Argentina	Unisexual trees with scaly rust-tinted flowers, leaves and branches	Berberidopsidales	Aextoxicon punctatum
Aizoaceae (dewplant family)	Aizoon, from Greek for "always living" or "hardy"	120 genera, in the drier tropics and subtropics	Shrubs and herbaceous succulents. New Zealand spinach and Sesuvium portulacastrum are cultivated as leaf vegetables. Living stones and some species with leaf windows are popular ornamentals.	Caryophyllales	Aizoon canariense
Amaranthaceae (spinach family)	Amaranthus, from Greek for "unfading"	183 genera, mostly tropical, with some warm temperate species	Shrubs and herbaceous plants, with a few vines and trees. The family includes spinach, quinoa, sugar beets and other foods, along with many common garden ornamentals, such as Amaranthus and Gomphrena.	Caryophyllales	Amaranthus caudatus
Anacampserotaceae (love-plant family)	Anacampseros, from a Greek plant name	3 genera, scattered in the Americas, Africa, Yemen and Australia	Succulent herbaceous perennials, some woody at the base	Caryophyllales	Anacampseros telephiastrum
Ancistrocladaceae (kardal family)	Ancistrocladus, from Greek for "fish-hooked branches"	1 genus, in tropical Africa and Asia	Woody vines and climbing shrubs. The genus's antimicrobial properties are under investigation.	Caryophyllales	Ancistrocladus heyneanus
Asteropeiaceae (manoko family)	Asteropeia, for Asteropeia, daughter of the mythological king Pelias	1 genus, in Madagascar	Shrubs and trees	Caryophyllales	Asteropeia labatii
Balanophoraceae (snake-mushroom family)	Balanophora, from Greek for "acorn-bearing" (for the shape of the male flower heads)	16 genera, scattered in the tropics, East Asia, South Africa and New Zealand	Herbaceous succulents without chlorophyll that are parasitic on roots and rhizomes	Santalales	Balanophora fungosa
Barbeuiaceae (liane-barbeu family)	Barbeuia, for Jacques Barbeu-Dubourg (1709–1779)	1 genus, in Madagascar	Woody vines with leaves arranged in spirals	Caryophyllales	Barbeuia madagascariensis
Basellaceae (Malabar-spinach family)	Basella, from a Malabar plant name	4 genera, mostly in the Andes and the tropics of the Americas	Succulent herbaceous perennials and vines, frequently with thick roots or tubers. Ulluco tubers were an important food crop in pre-Columbian Ecuador and Peru, and still are. Malabar spinach is a popular subtropical and tropical vegetable.	Caryophyllales	Basella alba
Berberidopsidaceae (coral-vine family)	Berberidopsis, from Greek for "like Berberis"	2 genera, in eastern Australia and southern Chile	Three species of woody vines, all with leaves that grow in a spiral pattern	Berberidopsidales	Berberidopsis corallina
Cactaceae (cactus family)	Mammillaria. Cactus, an earlier synonym, is from a Greek plant name.	150 genera, almost entirely in the Americas	Perennial evergreen shrubs, trees and vines, usually leafless with fat green succulent stems. Many species are houseplants or arid-climate ornamentals.	Caryophyllales	Mammillaria magnimamma
Caryophyllaceae (carnation family)	Dianthus. Caryophyllus, an earlier synonym, is from Greek for "nut (scented) leaves".	101 genera, mostly in the Northern Hemisphere	Mostly herbaceous plants, with some shrubs and small trees, rarely unisexual. Many genera, including Gypsophila (baby's breath), are grown as ornamentals. Carnations have been grown for at least two thousand years.	Caryophyllales	Dianthus caryophyllus
Didiereaceae (octopus-tree family)	Didierea, for Alfred Grandidier (1836–1921)	6 genera, all in Madagascar	Arid-climate shrubs and trees, sometimes vines. Some species are ornamentals.	Caryophyllales	Didierea madagascariensis
Dioncophyllaceae (hookleaf-vine family)	Dioncophyllum, from Greek for "two-hooked leaves"	3 genera, in West Africa and the Congo Basin	Woody vines and climbing shrubs. Triphyophyllum peltatum, which sometimes traps and digests insects, produces useful antimalarial compounds.	Caryophyllales	Triphyophyllum peltatum (type genus not shown)
Droseraceae (sundew family)	Drosera, from Greek for "dewy" (secretions)	3 genera, widespread, generally in areas with poor soil	Herbaceous plants. The popularity of the Venus flytrap, with jaw-like leaves that pin its prey, is endangering the species in the wild.	Caryophyllales	Drosera rotundifolia
Drosophyllaceae (dew-pine family)	Drosophyllum, from Greek for "dewy leaves"	1 genus, in southwestern Iberia and northern Morocco	Herbaceous plants with woody roots. Sticky leaf glands trap and digest insects and other small animals.	Caryophyllales	Drosophyllum lusitanicum
Frankeniaceae (sea-heath family)	Frankenia, for Johann Francke (1590–1661), a Swedish botanist	1 genus, widespread in drier, warmer zones	Salt-tolerant shrubs and herbaceous plants	Caryophyllales	Frankenia laevis
Gisekiaceae (stork's-henna family)	Gisekia, for Paul Dietrich Giseke (1741–1796)	1 genus, in Africa and southern Asia	Herbaceous plants, usually ground-hugging, with many-branched stems	Caryophyllales	Gisekia pharnacioides
Halophytaceae (verdolaga family)	Halophytum, from Greek for "salt plant"	1 genus, in Argentina	Succulent herbaceous annuals	Caryophyllales	Halophytum ameghinoi
Kewaceae (suring family)	Kewa, for Kew, London, England (site of Kew Gardens)	1 genus, in eastern and southern Africa	Herbaceous plants, some with wood at the base	Caryophyllales	Kewa angrae-pequenae
Limeaceae (lizard-foot family)	Limeum, from Latin for "path" (where some grow)	1 genus, in Africa, Arabia and India	Herbaceous plants with stems that grow along the soil surface, often with a woody base	Caryophyllales	Limeum africanum
Lophiocarpaceae (sandaarbossie family)	Lophiocarpus, from Greek for "small-crested fruit"	2 genera, in Africa, southern Arabia and western India	Herbaceous plants, some with wood at the base	Caryophyllales	Corbichonia decumbens (type genus not shown)
Loranthaceae (showy-mistletoe family)	Loranthus, from Latin for "strap" and Greek for "flowers"	78 genera, widespread	Parasitic evergreen vines, trees and shrubs	Santalales	Loranthus europaeus
Macarthuriaceae (Macarthuria family)	Macarthuria, for William Macarthur (1800–1882)	1 genus, in Australia	Stiff, rush-like herbaceous perennials with green (photosynthetic) stems	Caryophyllales	Macarthuria australis
Microteaceae (jumby-pepper family)	Microtea, from Greek for "small size", probably	1 genus, in the tropics of the Americas	Herbaceous annuals, sometimes woody at the base	Caryophyllales	Microtea debilis
Misodendraceae (feathery-mistletoe family)	Misodendrum, from Greek for "hating trees"	1 genus, in Argentina and Chile	Parasitic evergreen unisexual shrubs	Santalales	Misodendrum punctulatum
Molluginaceae (carpetweed family)	Mollugo, from Greek for "soft"	11 genera, mostly in the subtropics and tropics	Herbaceous plants (many with wood at the base) and cushion plants or subshrubs. Some Glinus and Mollugo species are used for seasoning.	Caryophyllales	Mollugo verticillata
Montiaceae (blinks family)	Montia, for Giuseppe Monti (1682–1760)	16 genera, mostly in the Northern Hemisphere	Mostly herbaceous plants, frequently with swollen roots. One species, bitterroot, was a staple food for some Native Americans.	Caryophyllales	Montia fontana
Nepenthaceae (Asian-pitcherplant family)	Nepenthes, from Greek for "antidepressant"	1 genus, mostly in tropical Southeast and East Asia	Unisexual shrubs and vines, some growing on other plants. The tips of some leaves develop into pitchers that trap and digest insects and other small animals. Many species and hybrids are popular ornamentals.	Caryophyllales	Nepenthes distillatoria
Nyctaginaceae (four-o'clocks family)	Mirabilis. Nyctago, an earlier synonym, is from Greek for "night" (flowering).	32 genera, mostly in the subtropics and tropics of the Americas	Trees, shrubs, herbaceous plants and spine-covered vines. Stem nodes are frequently swollen, and some have spines. Mirabilis expansa has been a food crop since prehistoric times. Mirabilis and Bougainvillea have ornamental species.	Caryophyllales	Mirabilis jalapa
Olacaceae (tallow-wood family)	Olax, from Latin for "scented" (wood)	28 genera, in the tropics, and in the subtropics of the Americas	Mostly evergreen trees, shrubs and vines, some with scented wood	Santalales	Olax scandens
Opiliaceae (bally-coma family)	Opilia (derivation unknown)	11 genera, in the tropics and temperate Oceania	Parasitic evergreen shrubs and trees, and a few woody vines	Santalales	Opilia amentacea
Petiveriaceae (henwood family)	Petiveria, for James Petiver (c. 1660 – 1718)	9 genera, almost entirely in the tropics of the Americas	Shrubs, trees, vines and herbs, some with spines	Caryophyllales	Petiveria alliacea
Physenaceae (balloonfruit family)	Physena, from Greek for "inflated" (fruit)	1 genus, in eastern Madagascar	Trees and shrubs	Caryophyllales	—
Phytolaccaceae (pokeweed family)	Phytolacca, from Greek for "plant" and modern Latin for "lac", a red dye	5 genera, mostly in the tropics and subtropics, with a wider range for Phytolacca	Trees, shrubs, woody and semi-woody vines and herbaceous perennials. Indian pokeweed is a leaf vegetable in Asia.	Caryophyllales	Phytolacca americana
Plumbaginaceae (thrift family)	Plumbago, from a Latin plant name	22 genera, worldwide	Shrubs, vines and herbaceous perennials. Armeria, Ceratostigma, Limonium and Plumbago are cultivated as ornamentals.	Caryophyllales	Plumbago europaea
Polygonaceae (knotweed family)	Polygonum, from a Greek plant name	56 genera, worldwide	Shrubs, trees, vines and herbaceous plants, some with hollow stems. Buckwheat (not closely related to wheat) is an ingredient in some pancakes and noodles. Leaf stalks of rhubarb are used to make jams and desserts. Edible tubers of coral vine are cultivated in Mexico.	Caryophyllales	Polygonum aviculare
Portulacaceae (purslane family)	Portulaca, from a Latin plant name	1 genus, mostly in warmer climates	Herbaceous succulents, frequently producing tubers. Purslane (from several Portulaca species) is a popular spongey-textured vegetable in many countries.	Caryophyllales	Portulaca oleracea
Rhabdodendraceae (clubfruit-tree family)	Rhabdodendron, from Greek for "rod tree"	1 genus, in northeastern South America	Shrubs and small trees	Caryophyllales	Rhabdodendron macrophyllum
Santalaceae (sandalwood family)	Santalum, from a Greek plant name	43 genera, widespread	Parasitic plants, including shrubs, trees and vines	Santalales	Santalum album
Sarcobataceae (greasewood family)	Sarcobatus, from Greek for "fleshy thorn bush"	1 genus, in western North America	Shrubs with succulent leaves, woody stems, and many thorns	Caryophyllales	Sarcobatus vermiculatus
Schoepfiaceae (whitewood family)	Schoepfia, for Johann David Schoepff (1752–1800)	3 genera, in South America, tropical North America, and East Asia	Parasitic green shrubs, trees and herbaceous perennials	Santalales	Schoepfia arenaria
Simmondsiaceae (jojoba family)	Simmondsia, for Thomas William Simmonds (1767–1804), an English doctor and naturalist	1 genus, in southwestern North America	Just one species of unisexual evergreen shrubs. Jojoba oil is widely used in cosmetics and pharmaceuticals.	Caryophyllales	Simmondsia chinensis
Stegnospermataceae (Cuban-tangle family)	Stegnosperma, from Greek for "dry seeds"	1 genus, from Mexico to Nicaragua and in the Caribbean	Small trees and shrubs	Caryophyllales	Stegnosperma cubense
Talinaceae (fameflower family)	Talinum, from Greek for "blooming lavishly", possibly	2 genera, in the tropics and subtropics of the Americas and Africa	More or less herbaceous plants, frequently with root tubers. Some Talinum species are grown as vegetables, and fameflower is an ornamental.	Caryophyllales	Talinum fruticosum
Tamaricaceae (salt-cedar family)	Tamarix, from a Latin plant name	4 genera, in dry and arid zones, scattered worldwide (since its introduction to the Americas)	Trees and shrubs with photosynthetic branchlets. The salt-tolerant Tamarix is used to control erosion of beaches and very dry soil.	Caryophyllales	Tamarix gallica

== See also ==
- List of plant family names with etymologies
