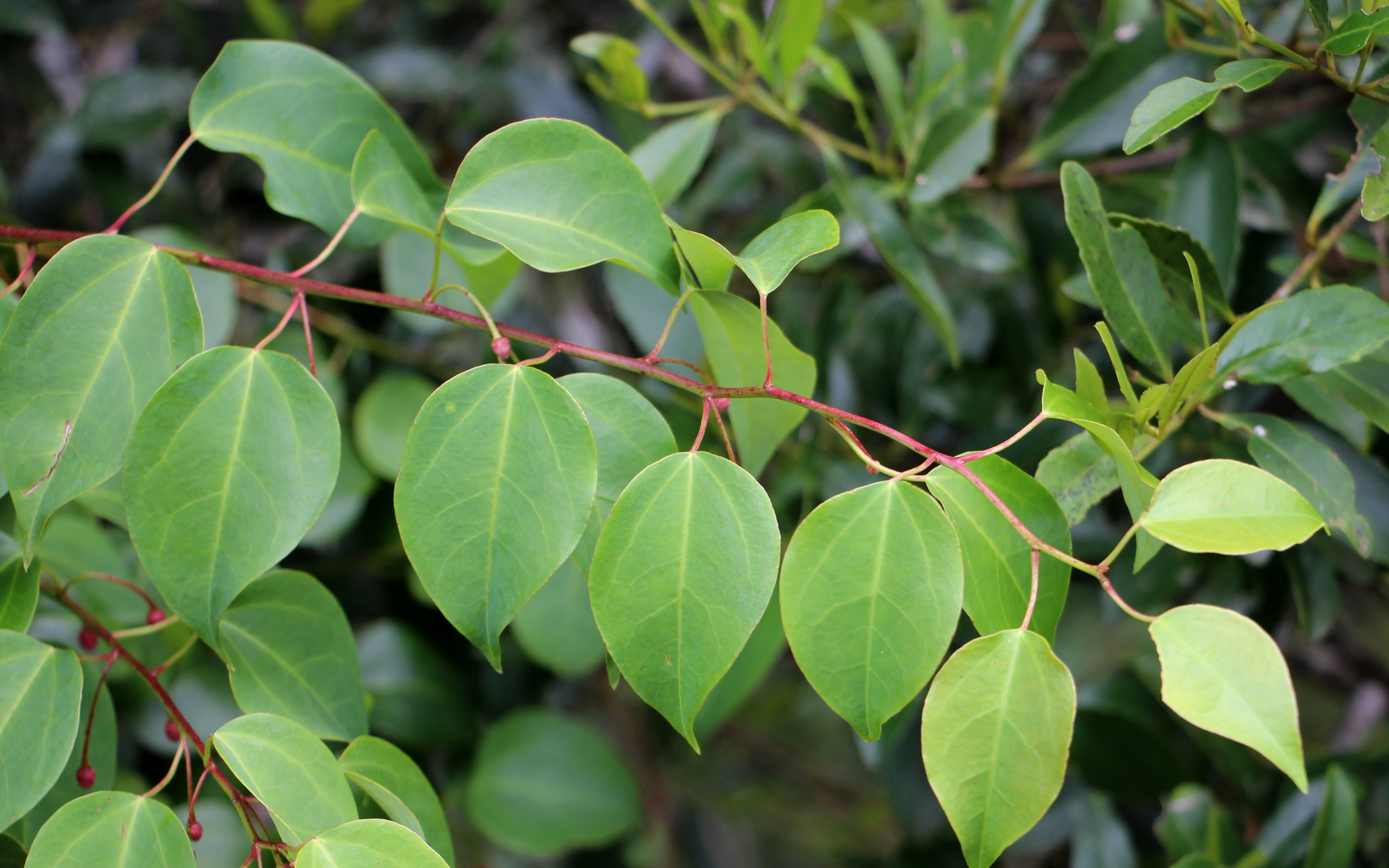
- Dorrigo National Park, Australia

Scientific classification
- Kingdom: Plantae
- Clade: Embryophytes
- Clade: Tracheophytes
- Clade: Spermatophytes
- Clade: Angiosperms
- Clade: Eudicots
- Order: Berberidopsidales
- Family: Berberidopsidaceae
- Genus: Berberidopsis
- Species: B. beckleri

Binomial name
- Berberidopsis beckleri (F.Muell.) Veldkamp

Synonyms
- Streptothamnus beckleri

= Berberidopsis beckleri =

Species of flowering plant

Berberidopsis beckleri is a species of climbing plant found in cool rainforests in eastern Australia. Its common name is the montane tape vine. Ferdinand von Mueller described the plant as Streptothamnus beckleri from collections at the Clarence River.

== Description ==
The Berberidopsis beckleri belongs to one of the three species of the family Berberidopsidaceae. The family Berberidopsidaceae belongs with the monotypic Aextoxicaceae to the order Berberidopsidales. This plant, is unusual for the core eudicots because they have been placed in the same order to the divergence of Asterids, Caryophyllales, and Santalales.

Was originally described as Streptothamnus beckleri by Von Mueller, in 1862. However, in 1984, Veldkamp moved the species to Berberidopsis on the basis of strong similarities in seed anatomy, pollen and wood, which are clearly different in Streptothamnus moorei.

== Morphology ==
Berberidopsis beckleri is a vine growing. New shoots are produced every year which contribute to the developing of flowers in the axils of leaves before it turns vegetative and producing twining stems.

=== Flowers ===
The flowers of Berberidopsis have a spiral phyllotaxis. They do not have a clear way to distinguish the bracts, sepals and petals. The flowers appear separate from anything else and dependent on long pedicels in the axil of an ovate leaf. They contain a progressive loss of red pigmentation from the outside towards the inner perianth parts.

Flowers display a spirally arranged perianth, which increase in size from the bracts to the inner tepals.

=== Petals ===
The petals are the number of perianth parts including bracts that varies between 13 and 16. They have a truncate apex.

=== Inner petaloid tepals ===
The inner petaloid tepals are larger in size than the outer tepal. This tepal creates an urceolate structure which enclose the sexual organs from the plants.

=== Stamens ===
The stamens are arranged in a single sequence with filaments which supports the anther. Stamen number varies between 11 and 13. Stamens are surrounded by a crenelated disc nectary.

=== Ovary ===
The ovary is the female organ, contains ovule which develops into seeds. Ovary is elliptical, with a massive style and green stigma lobes.

=== Leaves ===
The leaves are simple, ovate to broad–ovate, alternate, palmately veined. They are usually 3 cm to 6 cm long. Leaves are soft and thin, with a hairy look-like structure in the midvein and lowest veins.

=== Fruits ===
The fruits develop into berries surrounded by a persistent disc of style and stigma. Their colour is red to black. They usually produce between 100 and 200 seeds.

== Distribution ==
Berberidopsis beckleri is found in cooler rainforest in Australia, north from the Barrington Tops area in New South Wales to the Queensland border area. With the Australian monotypic genus Streptothamnus, Berberidopsis makes up the family Berberidopsidaceae.
