= A. densifolia =

A. densifolia may refer to:

- Acacia densifolia, a shrub endemic to south-eastern Australia
- Acmadenia densifolia, a flowering plant
- Antennaria densifolia, a perennial plant
- Appendicula densifolia, a flowering plant
- Arundinaria densifolia, a bamboo native to eastern North America
- Asteropeia densifolia, a plant endemic to Madagascar
