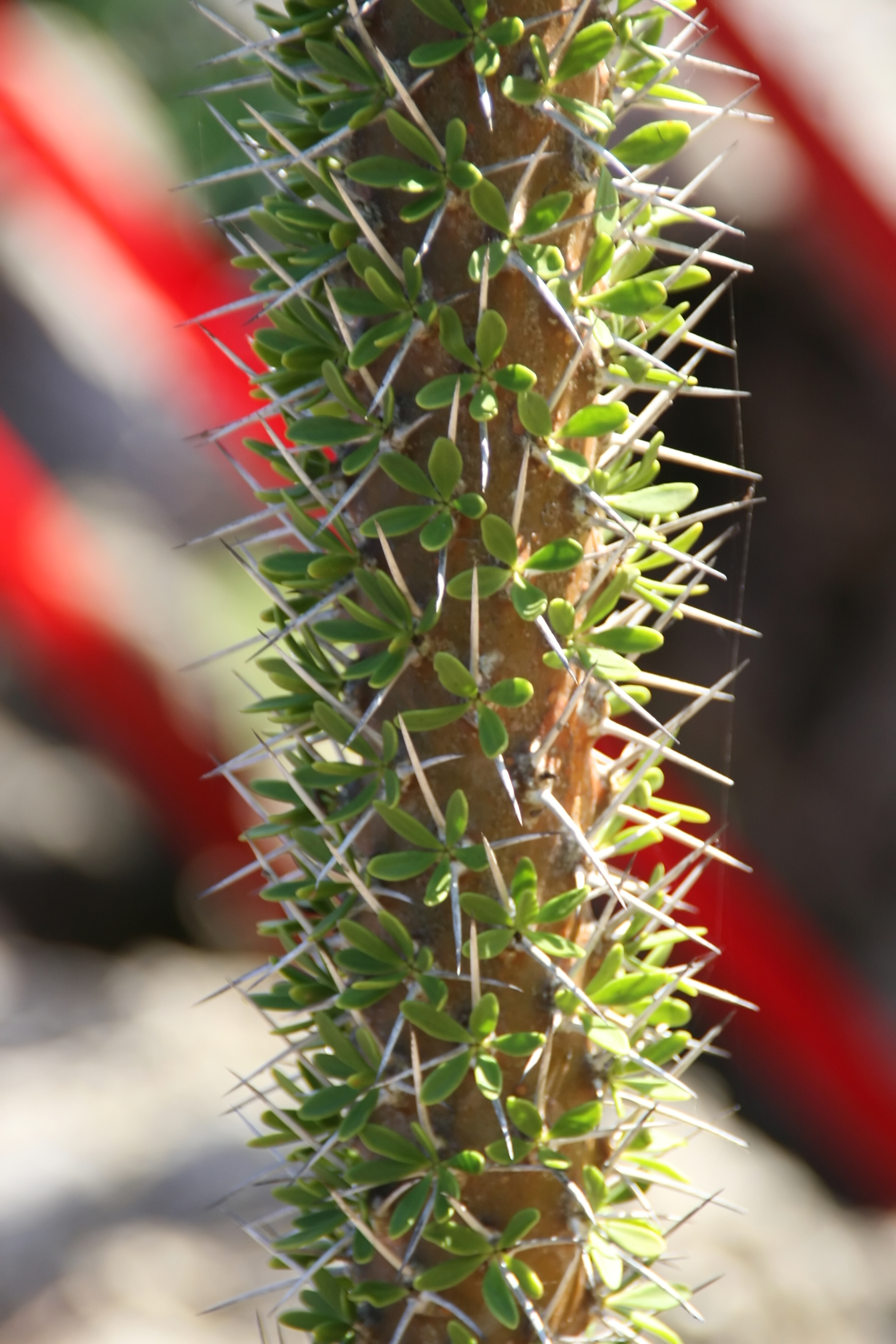

Conservation status
- Vulnerable (IUCN 3.1)

Scientific classification
- Kingdom: Plantae
- Clade: Tracheophytes
- Clade: Angiosperms
- Clade: Eudicots
- Order: Caryophyllales
- Family: Didiereaceae
- Genus: Didierea
- Species: D. trollii

Binomial name
- Didierea trollii Capuron & Rauh

= Didierea trollii =

Species of plant

Didierea trollii is a species of Didierea native to Madagascar Spiny Forests in the province first described in 1961. It is one of the two species of the Didierea, with the other being Didierea madagascariensis.

== Description ==
Didierea trollii is a plant that will grow steps in a shrub fashion. 3 spines per areoule the thorns tipped with a black point, with 3 typically, but sometimes 2 or 4 equally spaced fleshy succulent like leaves on each aeroule. Can grow up to 15 feet tall, and will branch rapidly.

== Flowers ==
This plant will produce greenish white flowers in clumps on the end of the branches. Pink stamens.
