= Asteropeia rhopaloides =

Conservation status
- Least Concern (IUCN 3.1)

Scientific classification
- Kingdom: Plantae
- Clade: Tracheophytes
- Clade: Angiosperms
- Clade: Eudicots
- Order: Caryophyllales
- Family: Asteropeiaceae
- Genus: Asteropeia
- Species: A. rhopaloides

Binomial name
- Asteropeia rhopaloides (Baker) Baill.

Synonyms
- Rhodoclada rhopaloides Baker

Species of plant

Asteropeia rhopaloides is a species of flowering plant in the Asteropeiaceae family. It is a shrub or tree endemic to Madagascar. It is native to eastern Madagascar from Loky Manambato to Tsitongambarika and Fort-Dauphin, and to the northeastern Sambirano region including Manongarivo Special Reserve, where it grows low and mid-elevation humid and subhumid forests from 400 to 1,650 meters elevation.
