= Asteropeia multiflora =

Conservation status
- Least Concern (IUCN 3.1)

Scientific classification
- Kingdom: Plantae
- Clade: Tracheophytes
- Clade: Angiosperms
- Clade: Eudicots
- Order: Caryophyllales
- Family: Asteropeiaceae
- Genus: Asteropeia
- Species: A. multiflora

Binomial name
- Asteropeia multiflora Thouars ex Tul.

Species of flowering plant

Asteropeia multiflora is a plant species in the Asteropeiaceae family. It is endemic to Madagascar. Its natural habitat is sandy shores.
