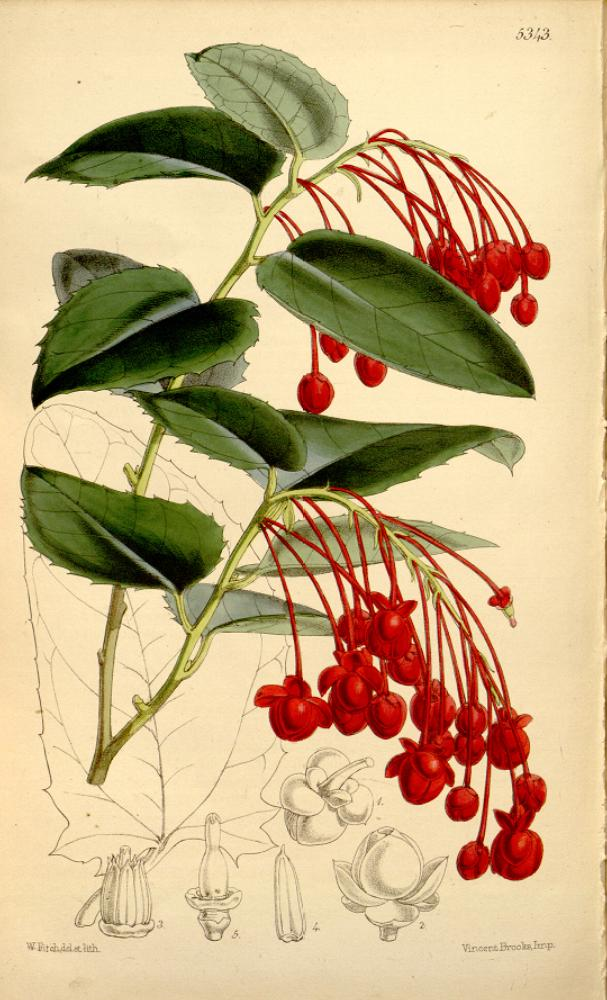
- Illustration

Scientific classification
- Kingdom: Plantae
- Clade: Tracheophytes
- Clade: Angiosperms
- Clade: Eudicots
- Order: Berberidopsidales
- Family: Berberidopsidaceae
- Genus: Berberidopsis
- Species: B. corallina

Binomial name
- Berberidopsis corallina Hook.f.

= Berberidopsis corallina =

Species of flowering plant

Berberidopsis corallina is a species of ornamental plant and is native to Chile. It is claimed to be restricted to the forests behind the port of Coronel in Arauco province and may perhaps be extinct there; brought by Richard Pearce in 1862.

== Description ==
Berberidopsis corallina is an evergreen, scandent shrub. The leaves are dark green, alternating, ovate or heart-shaped, and rigid in texture, with spiny teeth on the apex and margins, and range in length from 1.5 to 4 in.

Flowers are produced in the axils of the topmost leaves and in a terminal raceme, resulting in a dense cluster of dangling blooms. Each flower is borne on a slender stalk that resembles a crimson color, much like the flower itself, and measures 1.5 to 2 in long.

The flower is spherical, with a diameter of 0.5 in, composed of nine to fifteen petal-like segments, the outer ones of which are small and spreading, the inner ones larger and concave, all of which are the deep crimson color. It blooms in July and remains beautiful for two or three months.

== Cultivation ==
It is not completely resilient or easy to maintain. It may be planted on trees or left to roam among shrubs in western gardens in the UK, but it requires the shelter of a wall and must be thoughtfully sited elsewhere. A deep, moist soil is ideal, as is a location that is protected from drying winds and direct sunlight.

Berberidopsis corallina prefers fertile acidic soil, such as loam and sand and may withstand slightly alkaline soil if peat soil is added, but it is not preferable to chalky soil. Young plants can be grown from cuttings or layers. When first planted, a little peaty soil should be placed around the roots, but once established, they will grow aggressively.
