= Asteropeia matrambody =

Conservation status
- Vulnerable (IUCN 3.1)

Scientific classification
- Kingdom: Plantae
- Clade: Tracheophytes
- Clade: Angiosperms
- Clade: Eudicots
- Order: Caryophyllales
- Family: Asteropeiaceae
- Genus: Asteropeia
- Species: A. matrambody

Binomial name
- Asteropeia matrambody (Capuron) G.E.Schatz, Lowry & A.-E.Wolf

Synonyms
- Asteropeia amblyocarpa var. matrambody Capuron

Species of flowering plant

Asteropeia matrambody is a species of flowering plant in the Asteropeiaceae family. It is a shrub or tree endemic to northeastern and central-eastern Madagascar. Its natural habitat is moist lowland forest. It is threatened by habitat loss.
