= Habropetalum =

Conservation status
- Endangered (IUCN 3.1)

Scientific classification
- Kingdom: Plantae
- Clade: Tracheophytes
- Clade: Angiosperms
- Clade: Eudicots
- Order: Caryophyllales
- Family: Dioncophyllaceae
- Genus: Habropetalum; Airy Shaw (1951 publ. 1952)
- Species: H. dawei

Binomial name
- Habropetalum dawei (Hutch. & Dalziel) Airy Shaw (1951 publ. 1952)

Synonyms
- Dioncophyllum dawei Hutch. & Dalziel (1927)

Genus of plants

Habropetalum dawei is a species of flowering plant belonging to the family Dioncophyllaceae. It is the sole species in genus Habropetalum.

It is a scrambling shrub endemic to Sierra Leone in tropical West Africa. Its most noteworthy feature is its seed which develops outside of the fruit and is shaped like a spiral galaxy. Including the circular wing, it is up to four inches (ten centimeters) wide.
