= Asteropeia amblyocarpa =

Conservation status
- Least Concern (IUCN 3.1)

Scientific classification
- Kingdom: Plantae
- Clade: Tracheophytes
- Clade: Angiosperms
- Clade: Eudicots
- Order: Caryophyllales
- Family: Asteropeiaceae
- Genus: Asteropeia
- Species: A. amblyocarpa

Binomial name
- Asteropeia amblyocarpa Tul.

Synonyms
- Asteropeia amblyocarpa var. longifolia H.Perrier

Species of flowering plant

Asteropeia amblyocarpa is a species of plant in the Asteropeiaceae family. It is a shrub or tree which grows up to 15 meters tall which is endemic to Madagascar. It is native to northern northwestern, northeastern, southeastern, and the south-central highlands of Madagascar, where it grows in dry deciduous forests and moist lowland and montane forests from sea level to 1,700 meters elevation. It is present in several national parks.
