= Asteropeia micraster =

Conservation status
- Vulnerable (IUCN 3.1)

Scientific classification
- Kingdom: Plantae
- Clade: Tracheophytes
- Clade: Angiosperms
- Clade: Eudicots
- Order: Caryophyllales
- Family: Asteropeiaceae
- Genus: Asteropeia
- Species: A. micraster

Binomial name
- Asteropeia micraster Hallier f.

Species of flowering plant

Asteropeia micraster is a species of plant in the Asteropeiaceae family. It is endemic to Madagascar. The plant's natural habitat is sandy shores.
