= Asteropeia mcphersonii =

Conservation status
- Vulnerable (IUCN 3.1)

Scientific classification
- Kingdom: Plantae
- Clade: Tracheophytes
- Clade: Angiosperms
- Clade: Eudicots
- Order: Caryophyllales
- Family: Asteropeiaceae
- Genus: Asteropeia
- Species: A. mcphersonii

Binomial name
- Asteropeia mcphersonii G.E.Schatz, Lowry & A.-E. Wolf

Species of flowering plant

Asteropeia mcphersonii, a species of plant in the Asteropeiaceae family, is a shrub to large tree, up to 25 meters tall. Its oval leaves are about twice as long as they are wide and have a leathery texture. It is endemic to Madagascar, distributed in mid-elevation lowland rain forest in a narrow band from Ambatovy to Zahamena RNI. It is threatened by habitat loss, with an estimated total population of 1000–2,500 mature individuals.
