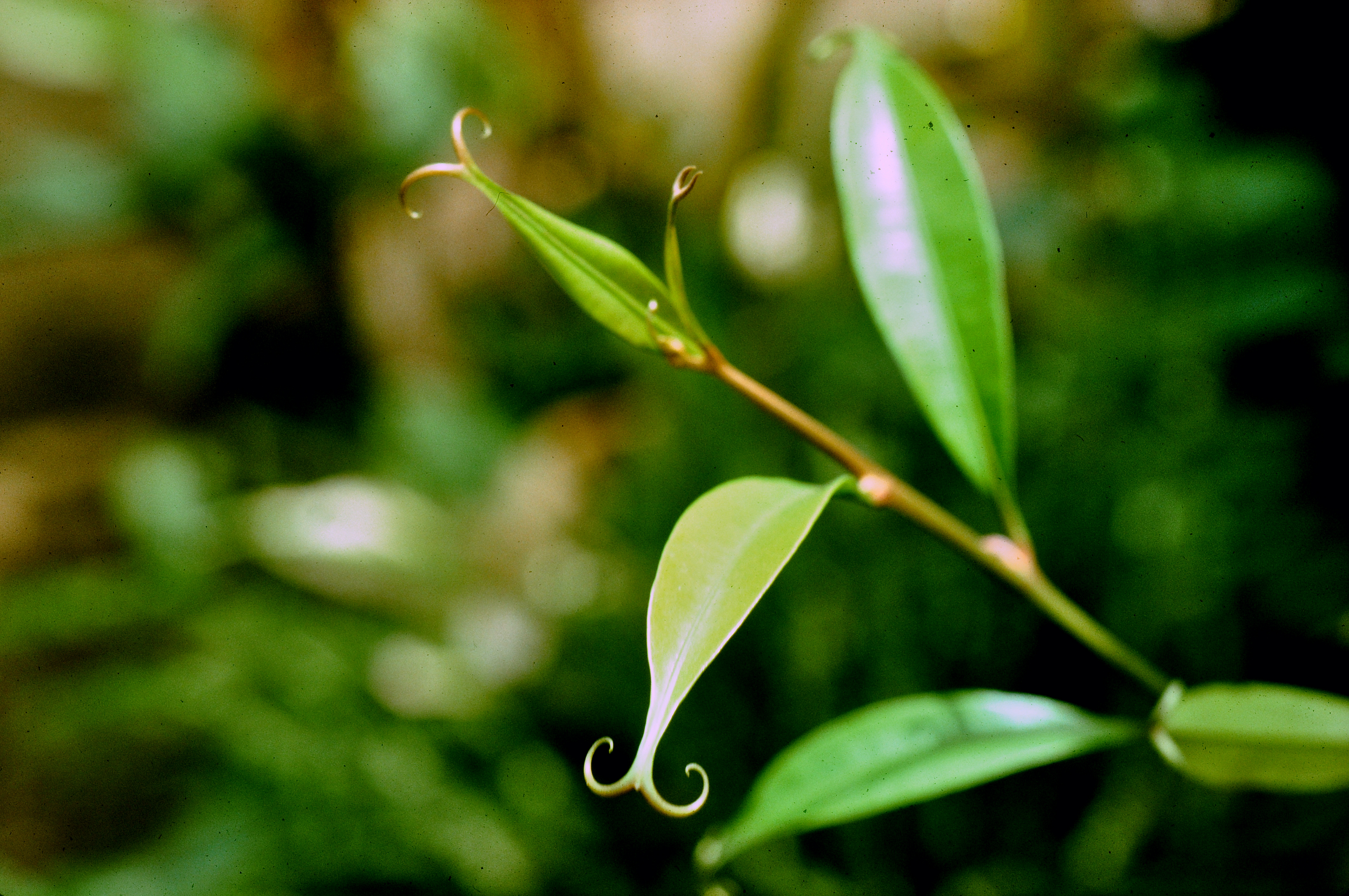
- Climbing adult Triphyophyllum with hooked leaves

Conservation status
- Near Threatened (IUCN 3.1)

Scientific classification
- Kingdom: Plantae
- Clade: Embryophytes
- Clade: Tracheophytes
- Clade: Angiosperms
- Clade: Eudicots
- Order: Caryophyllales
- Family: Dioncophyllaceae
- Genus: Triphyophyllum; Airy Shaw
- Species: T. peltatum

Binomial name
- Triphyophyllum peltatum (Hutch. & Dalziel) Airy Shaw
- Triphyophyllum is native to Guinea, Ivory Coast, Liberia, and Sierra Leone

Synonyms
- Dioncophyllum peltatum Hutch. & Dalziel

= Triphyophyllum =

Genus of carnivorous plants

Triphyophyllum peltatum is a facultatively carnivorous, up to 60 m (200 ft) tall vine in the monotypic genus Triphyophyllum /ˌtrɪfioʊˈfɪləm/ in the family Dioncophyllaceae native to tropical western Africa, in Guinea, Ivory Coast, Liberia, and Sierra Leone where it grows in tropical rainforest.

== Description ==
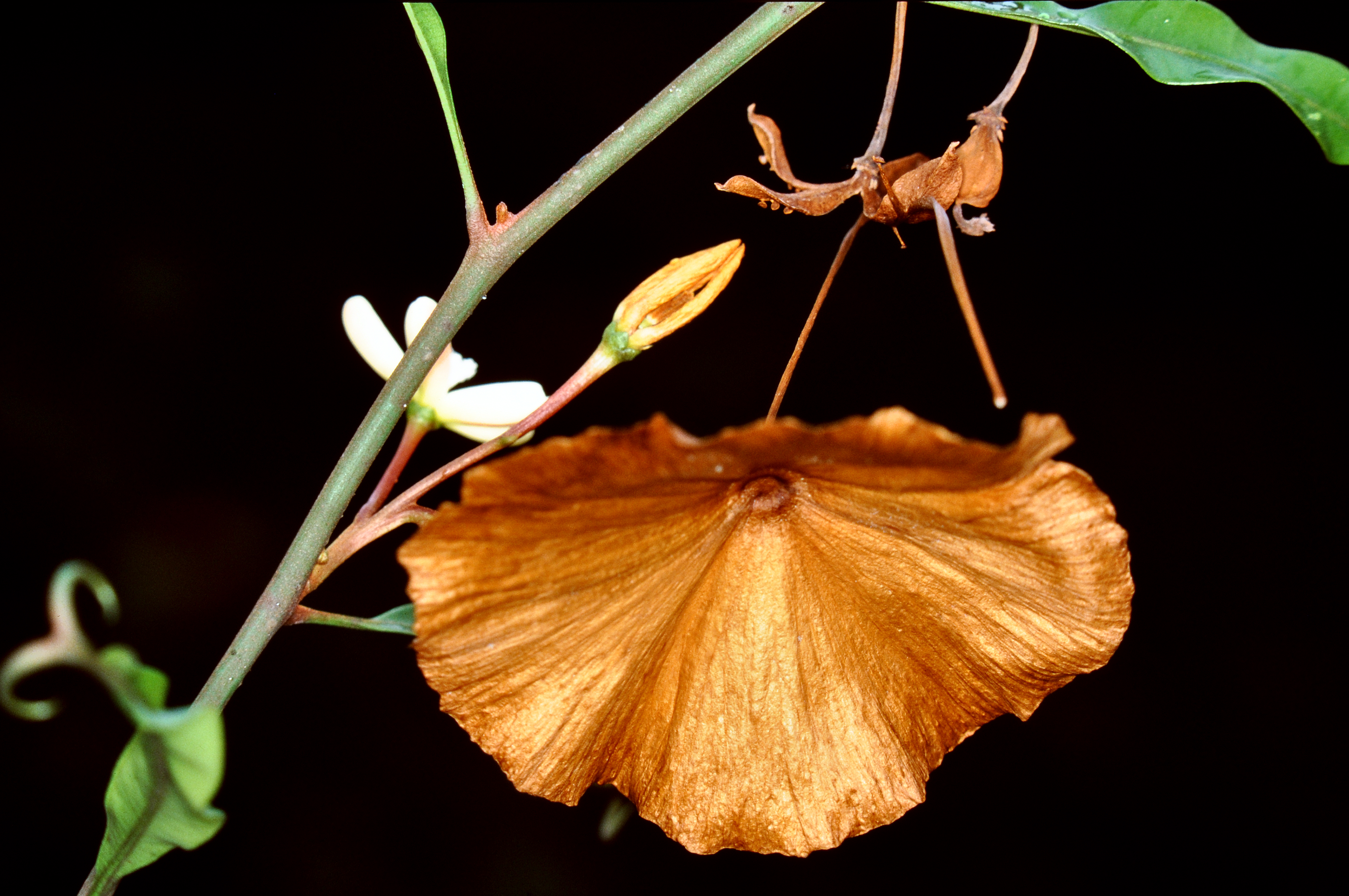
Flower, fruit and ripe seed of the adult plant

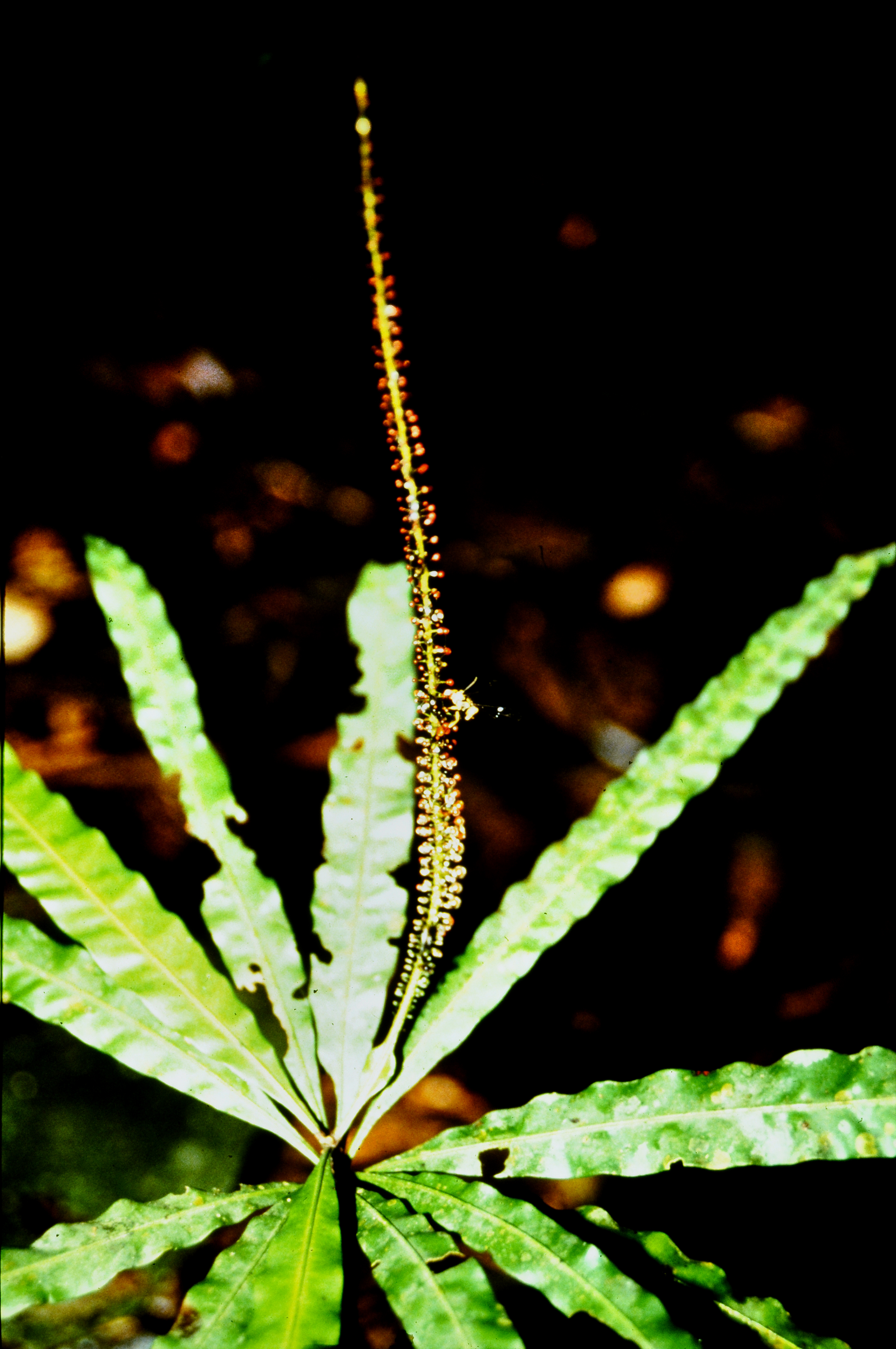
Juvenile non climbing insectivorous stage of Triphyophyllum with entire leaves and a single glandular insectivorous leaf resembling those of Drosophyllum

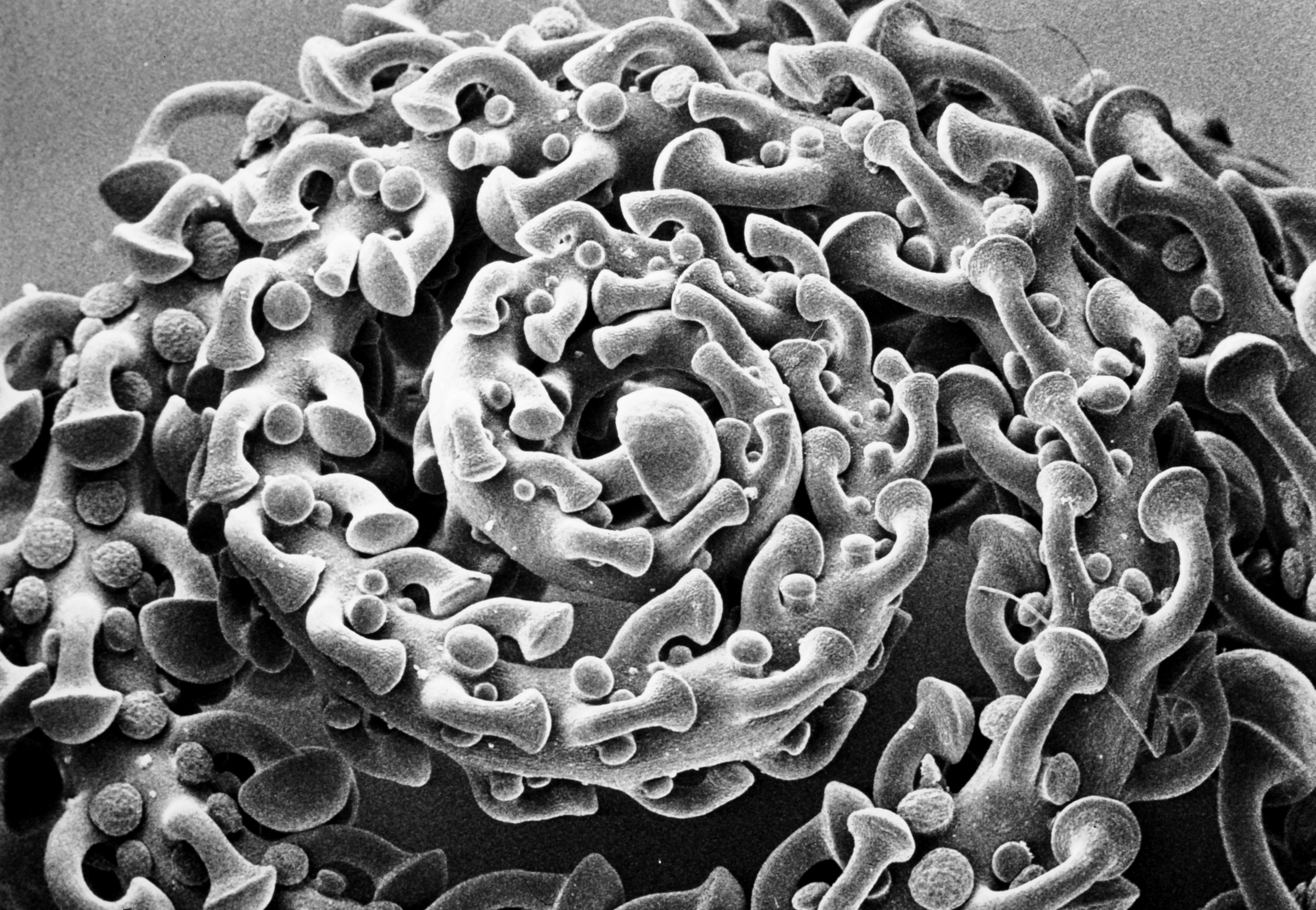
Unfurling tip of a juvenile insectivorous leaf with stalked glands in the SEM

=== Vegetative characteristics ===
It is a facultatively carnivorous, heterophyllous, up to 60 m (200 ft) tall vine with glabrous, terete stems. It has a three-stage lifecycle, each with a different shaped leaf, as indicated by its Greek name. In the first stage, T. peltatum forms a rosette of simple lanceolate Dracaena-like leaves about 18 cm (7.1 in) in length with undulate margins. At times when there is insufficient phosphorus in the soil it develops long, slender, glandular, circinate leaves up to 35 cm (14 in) in length and bearing two sorts of glands, and resembling those of the related Drosophyllum, which capture insects; there being one to three of these leaves in each rosette. In the plant's adult liana form it has short non-carnivorous leaves bearing a pair of "grappling hooks" at their tips on a long twining stem which can become 50 metres (160 ft) in length and 10 centimetres (3.9 in) thick. T. peltatum is the largest of all confirmed carnivorous plants in the world, but its carnivorous nature did not become known until 1979, over 50 years after the plant's scientific description.

=== Generative characteristics ===
The axillary, branched, cymose, few-flowered or many-flowered inflorescence bears up to 80 small, ephemeral, fragrant, white to pink, bisexual, actinomorphic, pedicellate flowers. The pedicel is up to 3 cm (1.2 in) long. The flower has 5 triangular, 2 mm long sepals, and 5 obovate, 13 mm (0.51 in)-long petals. The androecium consists of 10 stamens. The style is very short. The up to 4 cm (1.6 in)-wide, 1-seeded, 4–5-valved capsule fruit bears discoid, papery, flat, winged, circular, pink to red, 5–8 seeds up to 10 cm (3.9 in) wide. with an up to 5.5 cm (2.2 in) long funiculus extending beyond the fruit. Most of the seed's development occurs outside the fruit. The seeds are wind-dispersed.

=== Cytology ===
The chromosome count is 2n = 24, 36.

== Taxonomy ==
Triphyophyllum peltatum was first described as Dioncophyllum peltatum Hutch. & Dalziel by John Hutchinson and John McEwan Dalziel in 1927. It was moved to a new monotypic genus Triphyophyllum Airy Shaw as Triphyophyllum peltatum (Hutch. & Dalziel) Airy Shaw by Herbert Kenneth Airy Shaw in 1952.

=== Etymology ===
The generic name Triphyophyllum is derived from triphyes meaning of threefold form, and phyllum meaning leaf. It refers to the three growth stages of the plant with three different types of leaves. The specific epithet peltatum means shield-like and refers to the discoid seeds, which have a long stalk that extends the seed beyond the capsule fruit.

== Distribution and habitat ==
Triphyophyllum is found in Guinea, Ivory Coast, Liberia, and Sierra Leone, where it occurs in primary and old secondary dry evergreen rainforests. The habitat has a 6–7 month dry season. The acid, nutrient-poor soil is shallow.

== Conservation ==
It is a rare and endangered species, classified as Near Threatened on the IUCN Red List. Its population is declining, primarily due to habitat destruction from logging and mining.

== Cultivation ==
Triphyophylum peltatum is difficult to cultivate. It is cultivated in several botanical gardens: Würzburg, Hannover, Abidjan, Bonn, Cambridge University and is exceedingly rare in private collections.

== Uses ==
Triphyophyllum compounds; top left: R = -H: Habropetalin A; R = -OH: Dioncophyllin A.; bottom left: Dioncophyllin; bottom right: Dioncophyllin C.

Triphyophyllum peltatum is traditionally used in folk medicine in the treatment of elephantiasis and malaria. It produces many pharmaceutically active secondary metabolites, some of which have been found to have strong antiplasmodial activity. Some metabolites were found to have antitumoral and anti-multiple myeloma activity. The stems are used as tying material.
