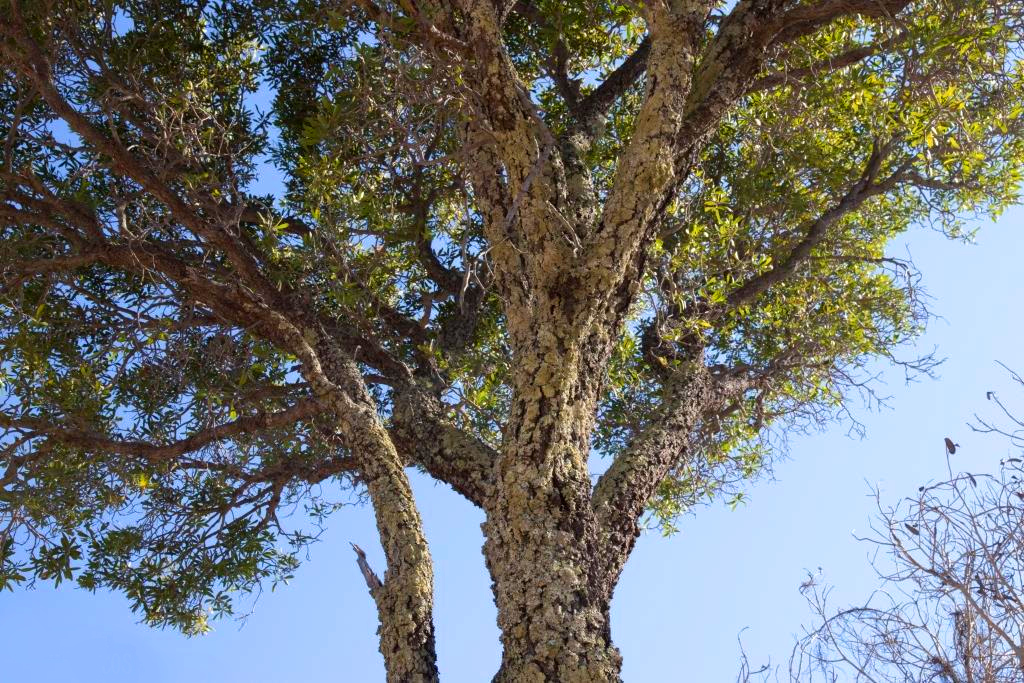

Conservation status
- Vulnerable (IUCN 3.1)

Scientific classification
- Kingdom: Plantae
- Clade: Tracheophytes
- Clade: Angiosperms
- Clade: Eudicots
- Order: Caryophyllales
- Family: Asteropeiaceae
- Genus: Asteropeia
- Species: A. labatii

Binomial name
- Asteropeia labatii G.E.Schatz, Lowry & A.-E.Wolf

= Asteropeia labatii =

Species of flowering plant

Asteropeia labatii is a species of plant in the Asteropeiaceae family. It is endemic to Madagascar. Its natural habitat is subtropical or tropical high-altitude shrubland. It is threatened by habitat loss.
