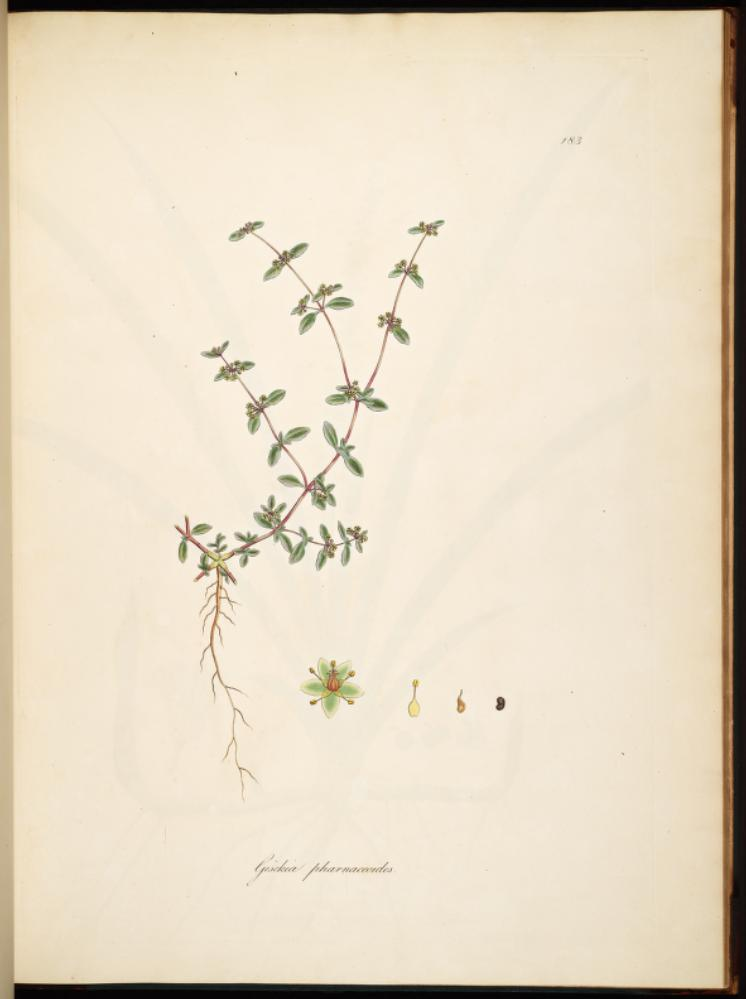
- Gisekia pharnacioides

Scientific classification
- Kingdom: Plantae
- Clade: Tracheophytes
- Clade: Angiosperms
- Clade: Eudicots
- Order: Caryophyllales
- Family: Gisekiaceae; Nakai
- Genus: Gisekia; L.

Species
- See text.

= Gisekia =

Genus of flowering plants

Gisekia is a genus of flowering plants. It is the only genus in the family Gisekiaceae and has seven species. The family was recognized in the APG II system (2003) and assigned to the order Caryophyllales in the clade core eudicots. This represents a change from the APG system (1998), which did not recognize this family.

The AP-Website accepts this family with one genus.

The genus was named by Carl Linnaeus after Paul Dietrich Giseke (1741-1796), a German botanist who studied under him, and who later published his notes on Linnaeus' lectures under the title Praelectiones in Ordines Naturales Plantarum (1792).

== Species ==
As of March 2026, Plants of the World Online accepted the following species:

- Gisekia africana (Lour.) Kuntze
- Gisekia diffusa M.G.Gilbert
- Gisekia haudica M.G.Gilbert
- Gisekia paniculata Hauman
- Gisekia pharnaceoides L.
- Gisekia polylopha M.G.Gilbert
- Gisekia scabridula M.G.Gilbert
