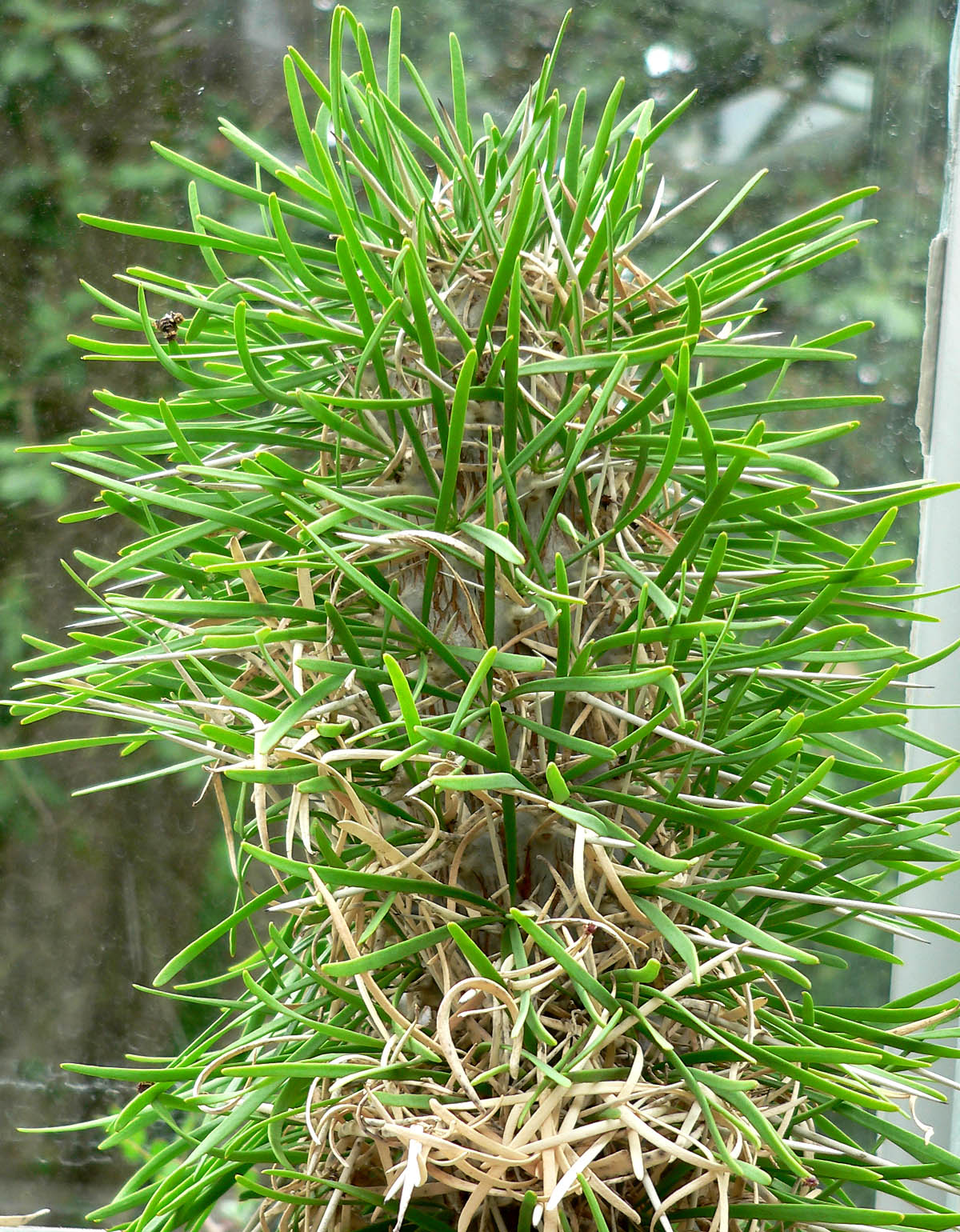
- Didierea madagascariensis
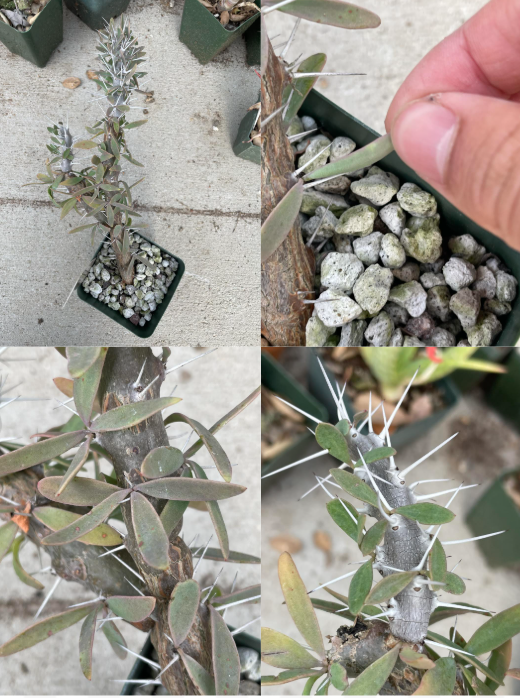
- Didierea trollii, the only other species in the genus Didierea

Scientific classification
- Kingdom: Plantae
- Clade: Tracheophytes
- Clade: Angiosperms
- Clade: Eudicots
- Order: Caryophyllales
- Family: Didiereaceae
- Subfamily: Didiereoideae
- Genus: Didierea; Baill.

Species
- Didierea madagascariensis Baill.; Didierea trollii Capuron & Rauh

= Didierea =

Genus of flowering plants

Didierea is a genus of succulent flowering plants in the family Didiereaceae. It is dedicated to naturalist Alfred Grandidier (1836-1921).

Species of Didierea are dioecious, with male and female flowers on separate plants. The two accepted and known species are endemic to Madagascar, though there are some species which are no longer considered part of this genus, where they are found in the spiny forest–thicket ecosystem. They are listed in CITES appendix II, which means that their trade is restricted to protect natural populations.

== Species ==
Image	Scientific name	Distribution
	Didierea madagascariensis	Madagascar
	Didierea trollii	Madagascar.
