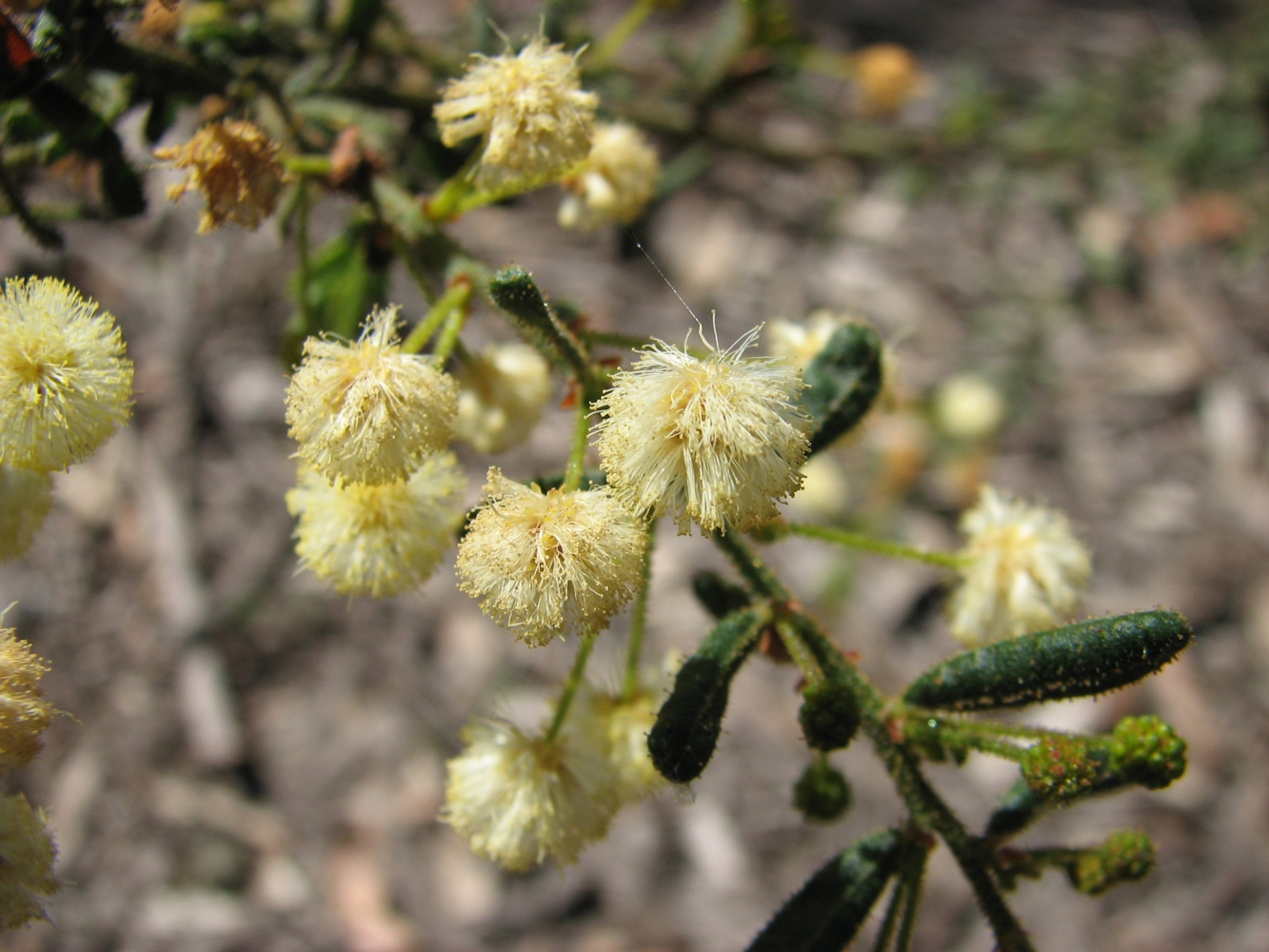
- Acacia aspera subsp. parviceps in Brisbane Ranges National Park, Victoria

Scientific classification
- Kingdom: Plantae
- Clade: Tracheophytes
- Clade: Angiosperms
- Clade: Eudicots
- Clade: Rosids
- Order: Fabales
- Family: Fabaceae
- Subfamily: Caesalpinioideae
- Clade: Mimosoid clade
- Genus: Acacia
- Species: A. aspera

Binomial name
- Acacia aspera Lindl.

Synonyms
- List: Acacia aspera var. densifolia (Benth.) Benth.; Acacia densifolia Benth.; Acacia erythrocephala A.Cunn. ex Benth.; Acacia strigosa Lindl. nom. illeg.; Racosperma asperum (Lindl.) Pedley

= Acacia aspera =

Rough wattle

Species of legume

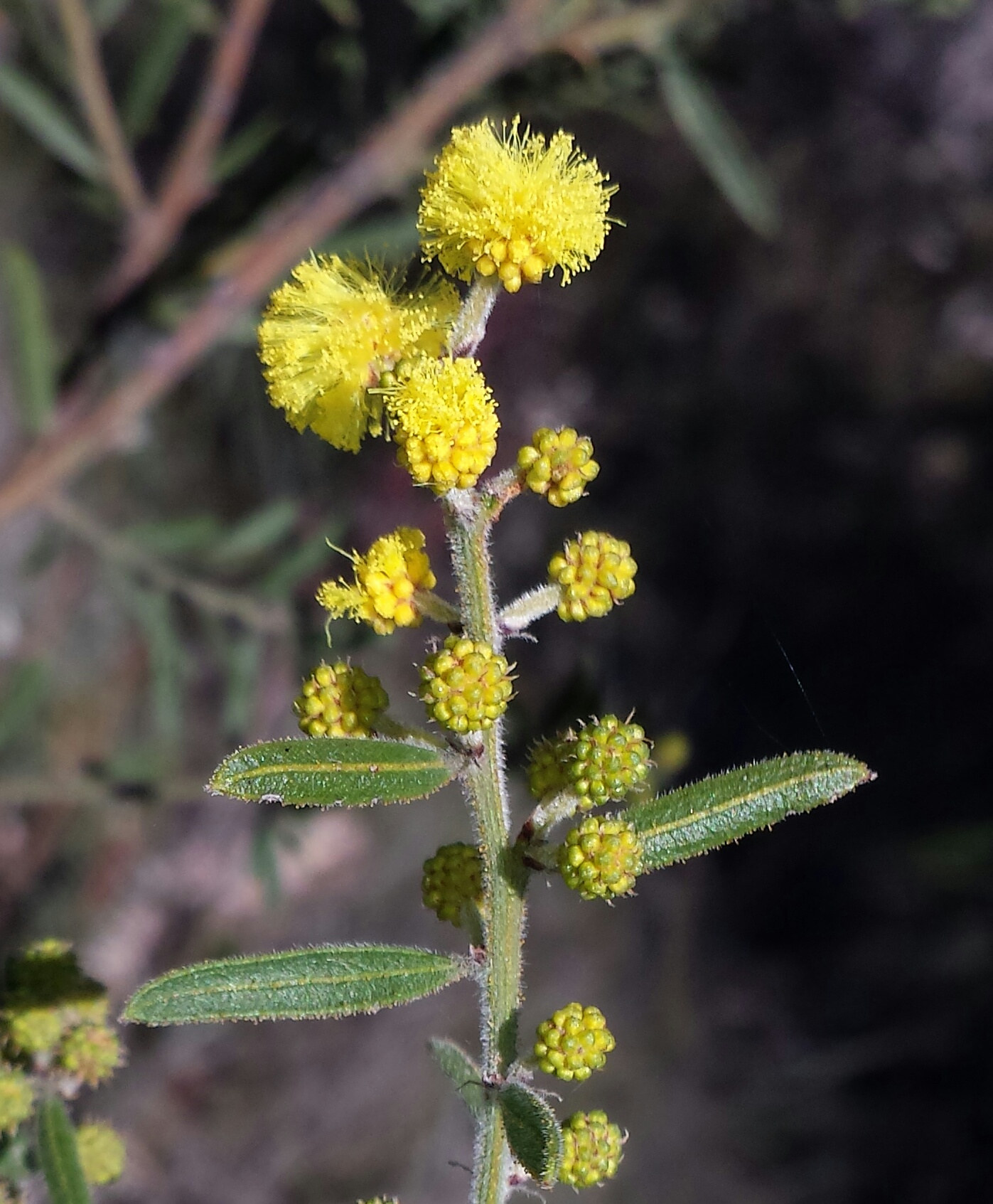
Subspecies aspera in Castlemaine Diggings National Heritage Park

Acacia aspera, commonly known as rough wattle, is a species of flowering plant in the family Fabaceae and is endemic to the south-east of continental Australia. It is an erect or spreading shrub with oblong to narrowly oblong or elliptic phyllodes, one or two spherical heads of cream-coloured to golden-yellow flowers and narrowly oblong pods up to 60 mm (2.4 in) long.

== Description ==
Acacia aspera is a spreading shrub that typically grows to a height of 0.5–2 m (1 ft 8 in – 6 ft 7 in) and has branchlets that are hairy and ribbed. Its phyllodes are oblong to narrowly oblong or elliptic, 6–30 mm (0.24–1.18 in) long and mostly 2–4 mm (0.079–0.157 in) wide with a prominent midrib. The flowers are borne in one or two spherical heads 4–9 mm (0.16–0.35 in) in diameter on peduncles 2–16 mm (0.079–0.630 in) long, each head with 24 to 50 cream-coloured to golden flowers. Flowering occurs from August to October and the pods are narrowly oblong to linear, papery to thinly leathery, 20–60 mm (0.79–2.36 in) long and 3–6 mm (0.12–0.24 in) wide, containing shiny dark brown seeds 4–5 mm (0.16–0.20 in) long with an aril on the end.

== Taxonomy ==
Acacia aspera was first formally described in 1838 by English botanist John Lindley in Thomas Mitchell's journal Three Expeditions into the interior of Eastern Australia, based on a collection made near present-day Swan Hill in Victoria during Thomas Mitchell's 1836 expedition.

In 2004, Neville Grant Walsh described subspecies parviceps in the journal Muelleria, and that name, and the name of the autonym are accepted by the Australian Plant Census:

- Acacia aspera Lindl. subsp. aspera (the autonym) has stout peduncles up to 10 mm (0.39 in) long and bright, golden-yellow heads 6–9 mm (0.24–0.35 in) long.
- Acacia aspera subsp. parviceps N.G.Walsh has peduncles 9–16 mm (0.35–0.63 in) long and pale lemon-coloured heads with 24–35 flowers in smaller heads. The subspecies epithet (parviceps) means 'small-headed'.

Putative hybrids between Acacia aspera and Acacia montana have been recorded in the Bendigo Whipstick region.

== Distribution and habitat ==
The species occurs in ranges from the Grampians eastward to the Warby Ranges in Victoria and from Yass northward to Peak Hill in New South Wales. It is found on sandy or gravelly soils in open forest or mallee communities.

Subspecies parviceps is restricted to Victoria, mainly from sites west of Melbourne, where it grows in open forest. Plants from the Bacchus Marsh area are intermediate between the two subspecies.

== Conservation status ==
Acacia aspera subsp. parviceps is listed as "endangered" under the Victorian Government Flora and Fauna Guarantee Act 1988.
