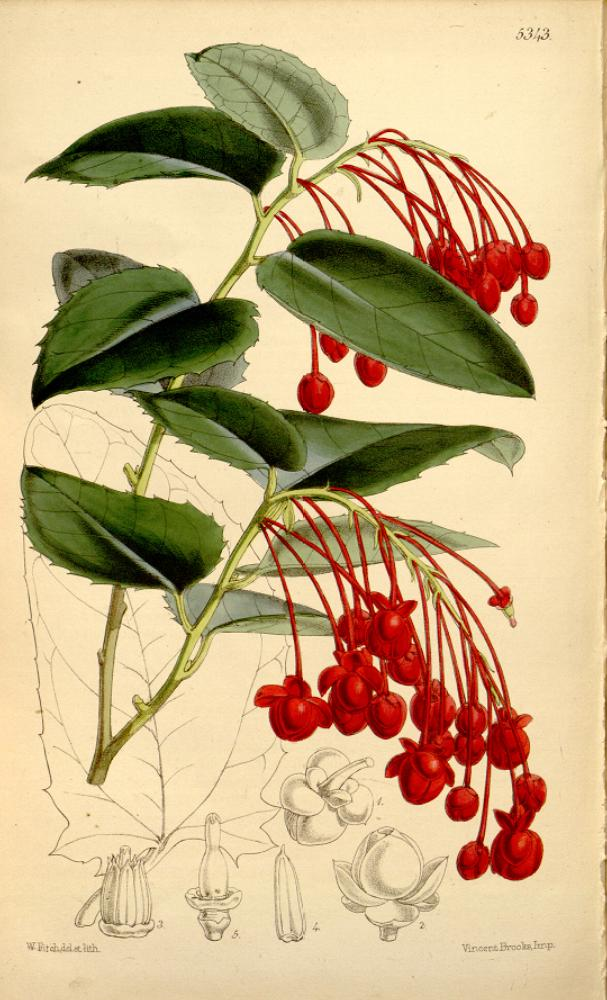
- Berberidopsis corallina, illustration

Scientific classification
- Kingdom: Plantae
- Clade: Tracheophytes
- Clade: Angiosperms
- Clade: Eudicots
- Order: Berberidopsidales
- Family: Berberidopsidaceae
- Genus: Berberidopsis; Hook.f.

Species
- See text.

= Berberidopsis =

Genus of flowering plants

Berberidopsis is a genus of flowering plants in the small family Berberidopsidaceae.

== Species ==
As of April 2023, Plants of the World Online accepted the following species:

- Berberidopsis beckleri – montane tape vine, of Australia.
- Berberidopsis corallina – coral plant of Chile, a threatened woody vine, locally known as voqui fuco. Its stems are used in traditional basketry by southern Mapuche people.
