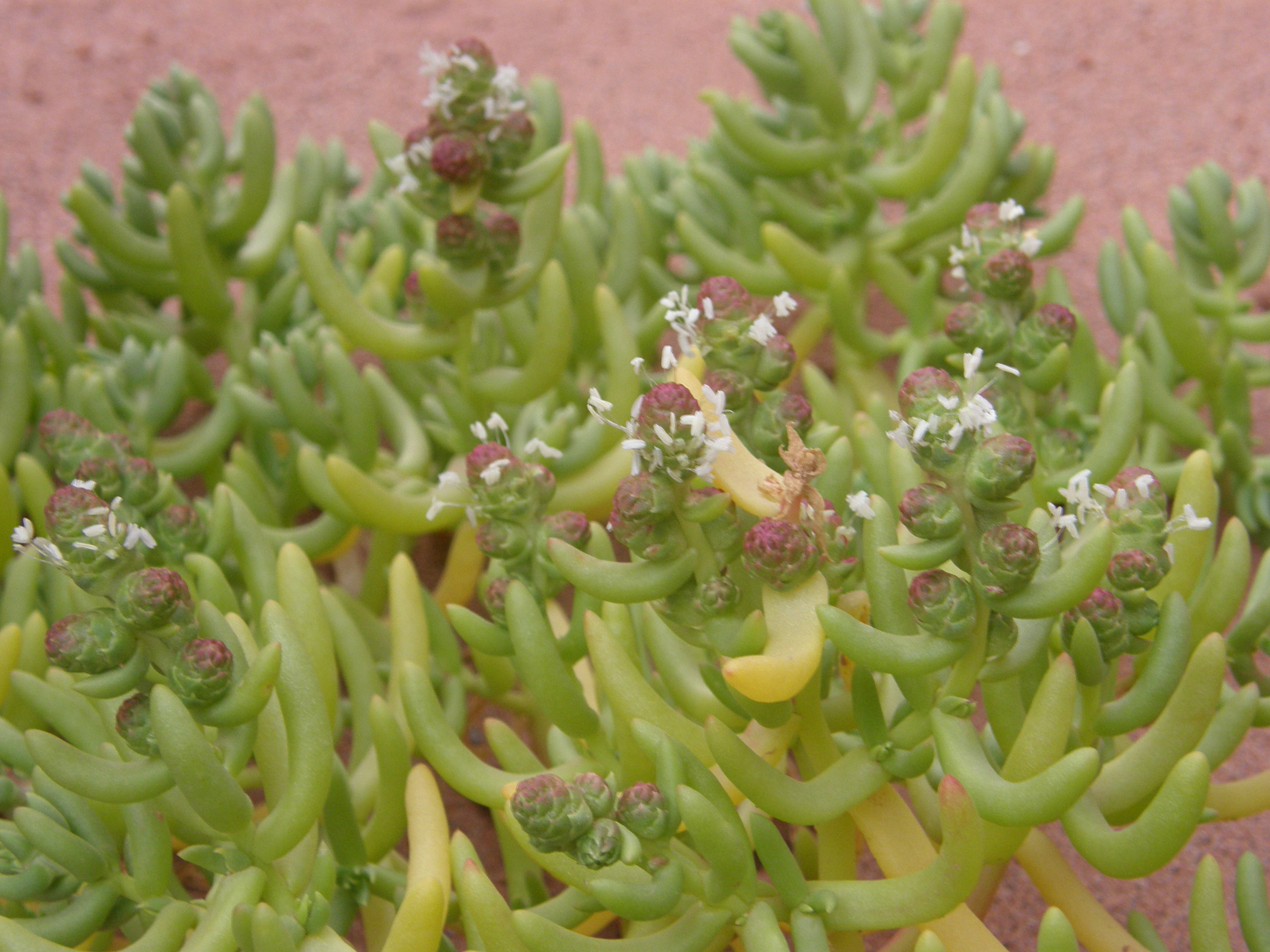

Scientific classification
- Kingdom: Plantae
- Clade: Tracheophytes
- Clade: Angiosperms
- Clade: Eudicots
- Order: Caryophyllales
- Family: Halophytaceae; A.Soriano
- Genus: Halophytum; Speg.
- Species: H. ameghinoi

Binomial name
- Halophytum ameghinoi (Speg.) Speg.

= Halophytum =

Genus of flowering plants

Halophytum ameghinoi is a species of herbaceous plant endemic to Patagonia. It is the only species in the genus Halophytum. It is a succulent annual plant, with simple, fleshy, alternate leaves. The plants are monoecious, with solitary female flowers and inflorescences of male flowers on the same plant .

Halophytum has sometimes been placed in its own family, Halophytaceae. For instance, the 2009 APG III system and the 2003 APG II system recognise the family and assign it to the order Caryophyllales in the clade core eudicots, although the 1998 APG system did not recognise such a family, placing its members in the family Chenopodiaceae instead.
