= Asteropeia densiflora =

Conservation status
- Vulnerable (IUCN 3.1)

Scientific classification
- Kingdom: Plantae
- Clade: Tracheophytes
- Clade: Angiosperms
- Clade: Eudicots
- Order: Caryophyllales
- Family: Asteropeiaceae
- Genus: Asteropeia
- Species: A. densiflora

Binomial name
- Asteropeia densiflora Baker

Synonyms
- Asteropeia rhopaloides var. angustata H.Perrier; Asteropeia sphaerocarpa Baker

Species of flowering plant

Asteropeia densiflora is a species of flowering plant in the Asteropeiaceae family. It is a shrub or tree endemic to central Madagascar. Its natural habitat is high-elevation shrubland. It is threatened by habitat loss.
