= Fort Dauphin =

Fort Dauphin may refer to:

Canada

- Fort Dauphin (Manitoba), in Manitoba
- Fort Dauphin (Nova Scotia), in Nova Scotia

Haiti

- Fort-Liberté in Haiti

Madagascar

- Fort Dauphin (Madagascar)
