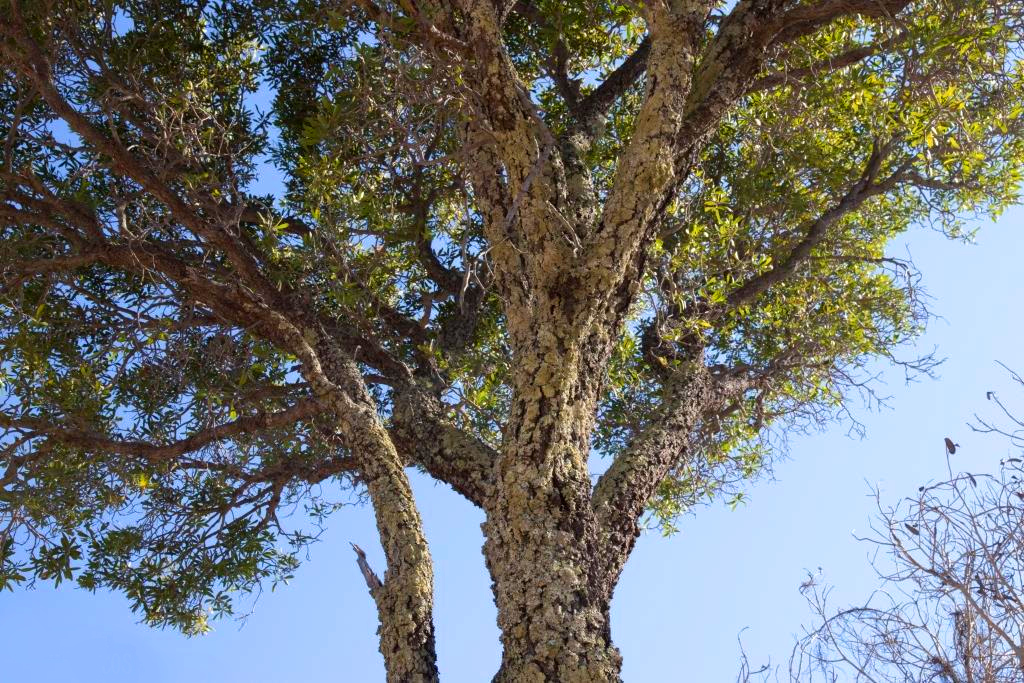
- Asteropeia labatii

Scientific classification
- Kingdom: Plantae
- Clade: Tracheophytes
- Clade: Angiosperms
- Clade: Eudicots
- Order: Caryophyllales
- Family: Asteropeiaceae; Takht. ex Reveal & Hoogland
- Genus: Asteropeia; Thouars

Species
- Asteropeia amblyocarpa Tul.; Asteropeia densiflora Baker; Asteropeia labatii G.E.Schatz, Lowry & A.-E.Wolf; Asteropeia matrambody (Capuron) G.E.Schatz, Lowry & A.-E.Wolf; Asteropeia mcphersonii G.E.Schatz, Lowry & A.-E.Wolf; Asteropeia micraster Hallier f.; Asteropeia multiflora Thouars; Asteropeia rhopaloides (Baker) Baill.

Synonyms
- Rhodoclada Baker

= Asteropeia =

Genus of flowering plants

"Asteropeia" may also refer to a figure in Greek mythology, see Antinoe

Asteropeia is a genus of flowering plants. The genus contains 8 known species of shrubs and small trees, all endemic to Madagascar. It is the sole genus in family Asteropeiaceae. Members of the family are evergreen trees or shrubs.

Members of the family were separated from the Theaceae based on wood anatomy by the APG system of 1998, and assigned to the order Caryophyllales in the clade core eudicots. The family consists of a single genus, Asteropeia, native to Madagascar.

According to the AP-Website it forms a clade together with the family Physenaceae (also of Madagascar).
