= Paul Dietrich Giseke =

Paul Dietrich Giseke (8 December 1741 – 26 April 1796) was a German botanist, physician, teacher and librarian.

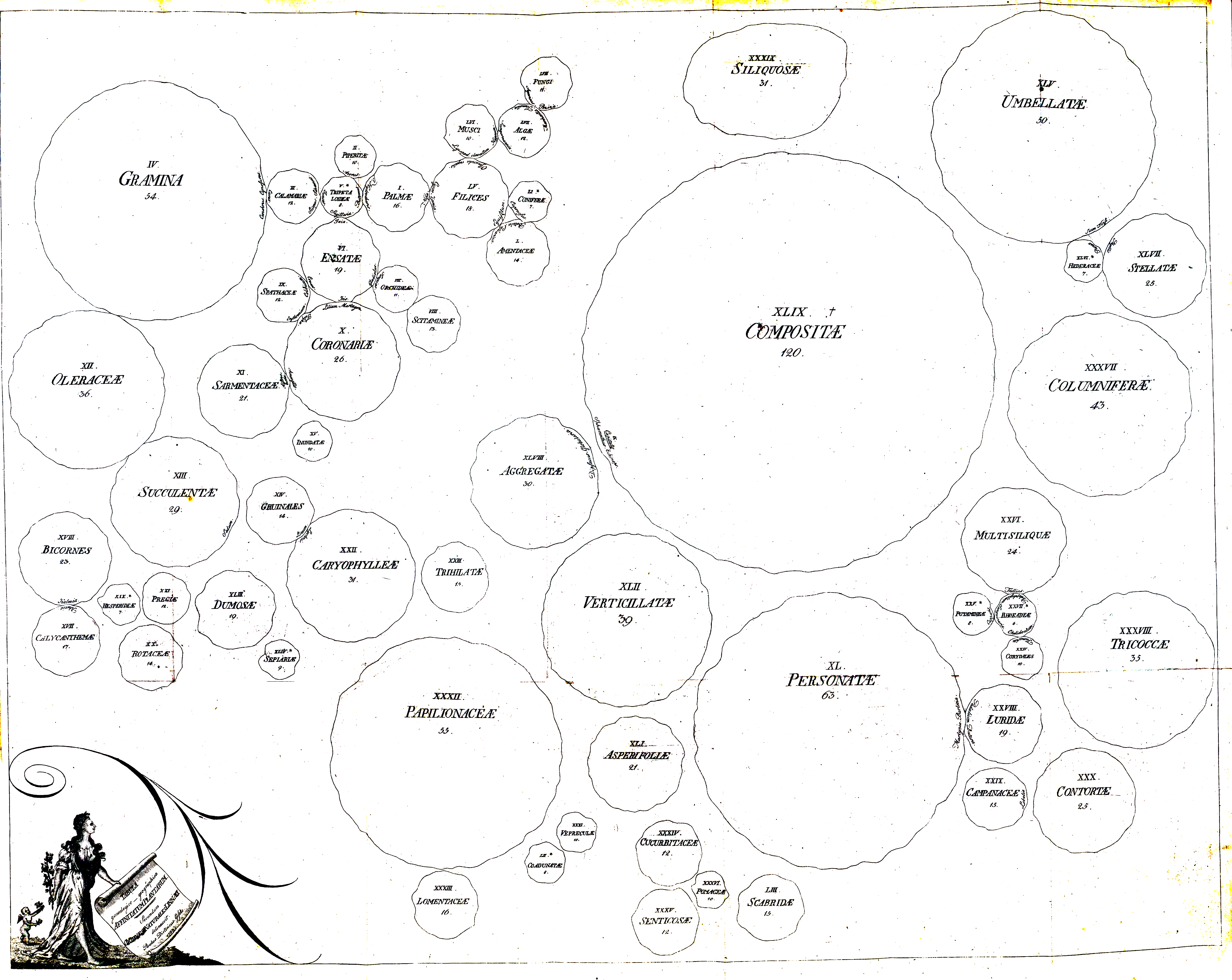
Giseke's map of the plant families

He was born in Hamburg, Germany. Giseke was the son of a Hamburg merchant. He started his studies at the Academic Gymnasium in Hamburg. He joined the University of Göttingen in 1764 and graduated in medicine in 1767. He then went on an extended trip through France and Sweden and met Linnaeus, becoming his student and a lifelong friend - Linnaeus named the genus Gisekia, now in family Gisekiaceae, after him. Giseke made notes of Linnaeus' lectures and published them in 1792 as Praelectiones in Ordines Naturales Plantarum. The book included an illustration "Tabula genealogico-geographica affinitatum plantarum secundum ordines naturales Linnaei" which showed the affinities of the families in a form similar to a geographical map. It included circles for families with the size indicating the number of genera contained. Back from his travels, he settled in Hamburg and started practice as a physician, but in December 1771 started teaching as Professor of Physics and Discourse at the Academic Gymnasium in Hamburg. He became a librarian at Hamburg from 1784. He was admitted to the Leopoldina academy posthumously.
