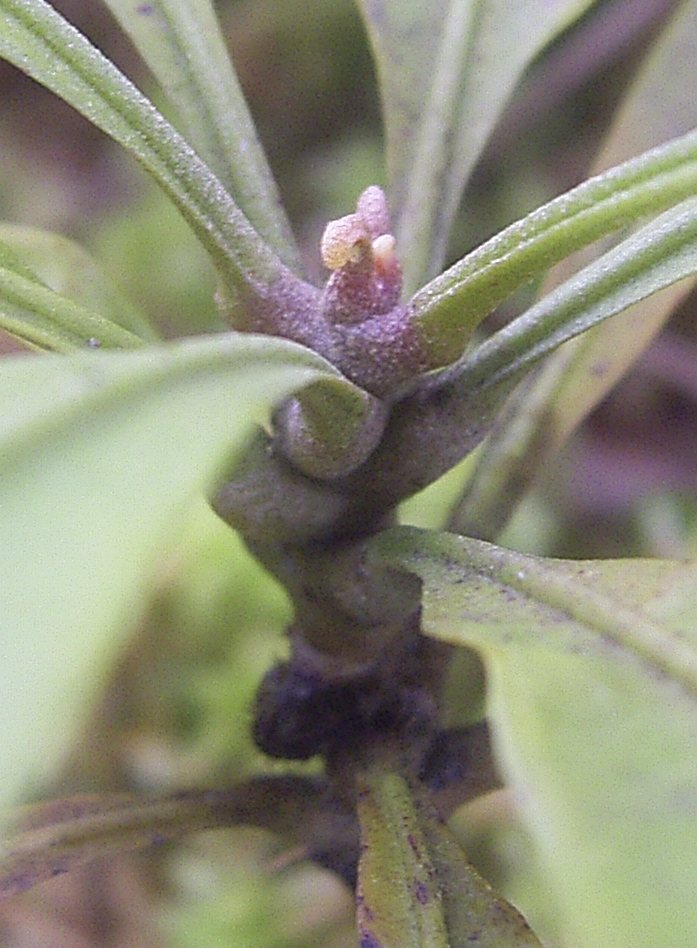
- Triphyophyllum peltatum

Scientific classification
- Kingdom: Plantae
- Clade: Tracheophytes
- Clade: Angiosperms
- Clade: Eudicots
- Order: Caryophyllales
- Family: Dioncophyllaceae; Airy Shaw

Genera
- Dioncophyllum Baill.; Triphyophyllum Airy Shaw; Habropetalum Airy Shaw

= Dioncophyllaceae =

Family of flowering plants

The Dioncophyllaceae are a family of flowering plants consisting of three species of lianas native to the rainforests of western Africa.

Their closest relatives are Ancistrocladaceae. Both families lie within a clade of mostly carnivorous plants which, since 1998 or so, have been moved to the order Caryophyllales. This clade also includes the families Droseraceae (sundews and Venus' flytrap) and Nepenthaceae (an Old World genus of pitcher plants), as well as Drosophyllaceae.

All species in the family are lianas at some point in their lifecycles, and climb by the use of pairs of hooks or tendrils formed by the end of the leaf midribs. The best-known member is the carnivorous Triphyophyllum peltatum, although the family contains two other species: Habropetalum dawei and Dioncophyllum thollonii.

== History of classification ==
The Cronquist system (1981) had placed the family in order Violales.

The APG II system, of 2003 (unchanged from the APG system, of 1998), does recognize this family and assigns it to the order Caryophyllales in the clade core eudicots.
