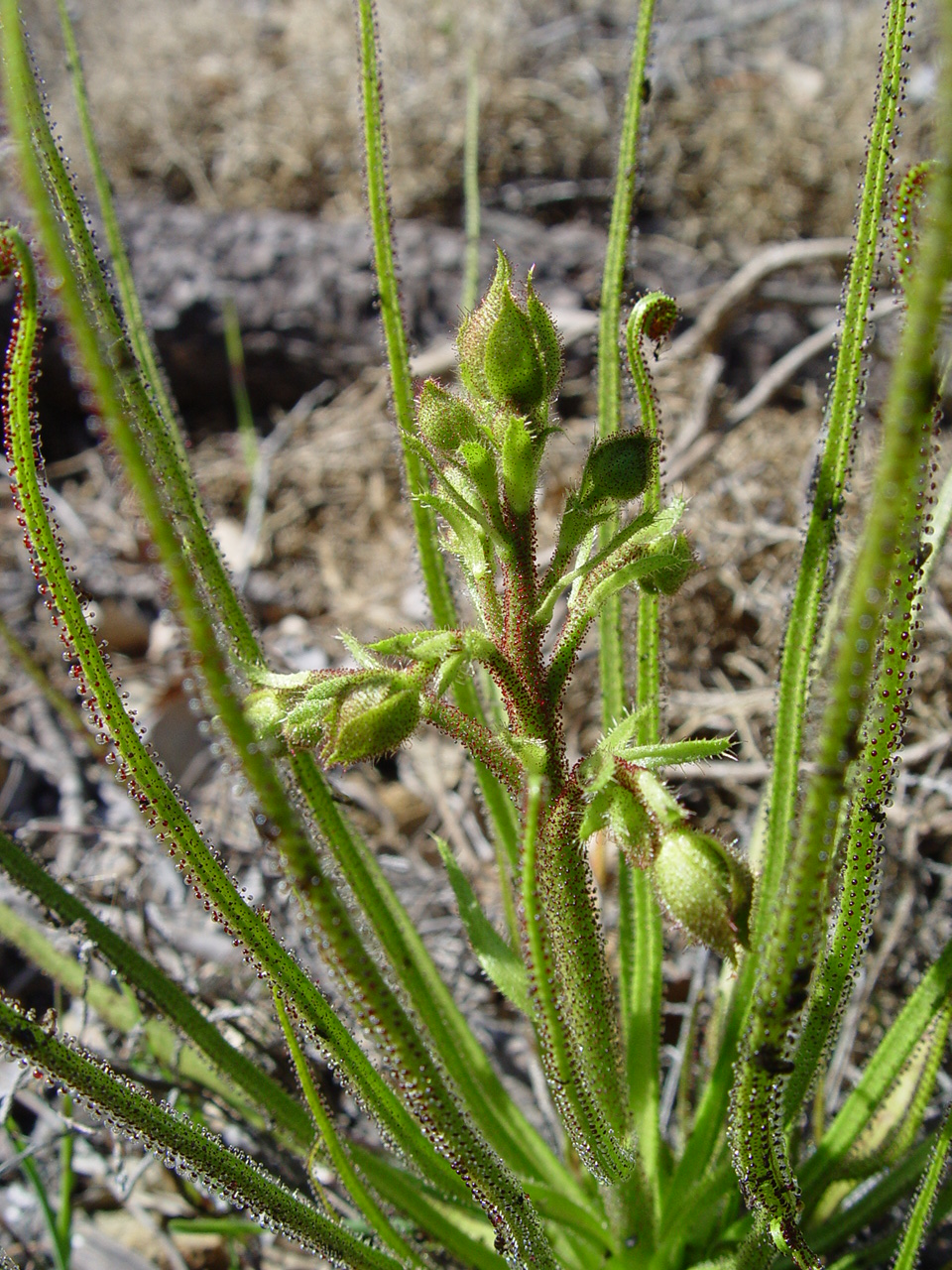
- Drosophyllum lusitanicum in the wild

Scientific classification
- Kingdom: Plantae
- Clade: Tracheophytes
- Clade: Angiosperms
- Clade: Eudicots
- Order: Caryophyllales
- Family: Drosophyllaceae; Chrtek, Slaviková & Studnička
- Genus: Drosophyllum; Link
- Species: D. lusitanicum

Binomial name
- Drosophyllum lusitanicum (L.) Link
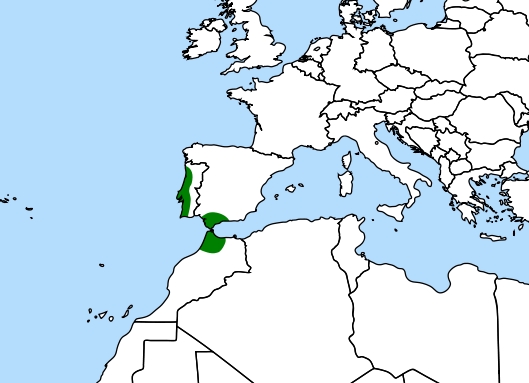
- Drosophyllum distribution

Synonyms
- Drosera lusitanica L.; Drosophyllum pedatum Dutailly nom.nud.; Rorella lusitanica (L.) Raf.; Spergulus droseroides Brot. ex Steud. nom.illeg.

= Drosophyllum =

Genus of carnivorous plants

Drosophyllum (/ˌdrɒsoʊˈfɪləm/ DROSS-oh-FIL-əm, rarely /drəˈsɒfɪləm/ drə-SOF-il-əm) is a genus of carnivorous plants containing the single species Drosophyllum lusitanicum, commonly known as Portuguese sundew or dewy pine. In appearance, it is similar to the related genus Drosera (the sundews), and to the much more distantly related Byblis (the rainbow plants).

== Description ==
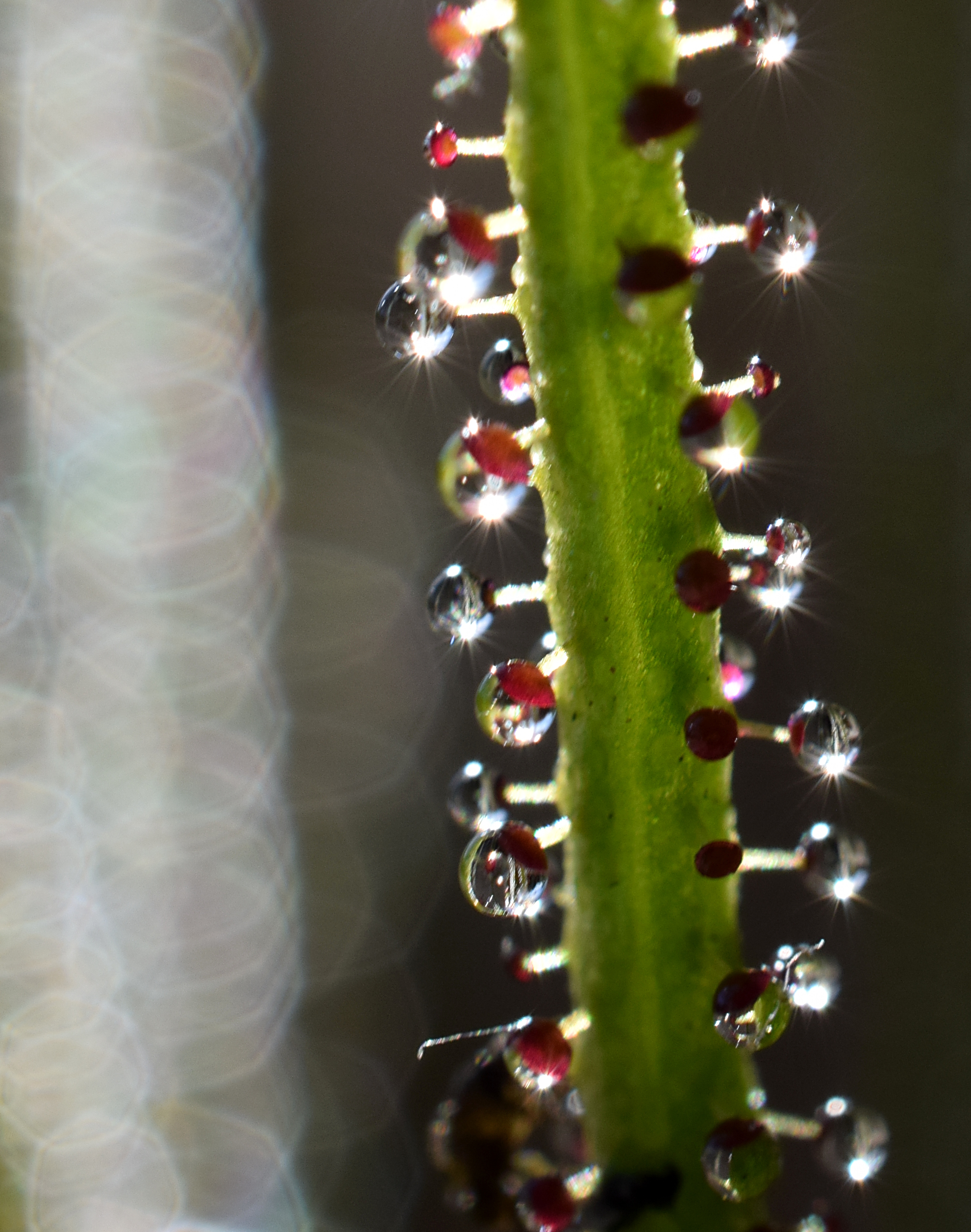
The mucilaginous glands of the plant

Drosophyllum lusitanicum is a perennial carnivorous plant with woody stems at the base, short, simple or rarely branched, tortuous or erect. Leaves are basal in a dense rosette, sessile, linear, sheathed, circinate, covered with sessile and pedunculated glands. The caulines are sessile, alternate, the upper bracteiform. Flowers are on top, racemiform or corymbiform and bear five 20–30 mm (0.79–1.18 in) yellow petals. The flower calyx has five lobes and is late deciduous. The plant has ten stamens and introrsal anthers. Gynoecium has five carpels. It has five styles, simple; capitate stigma. Fruit is in a unilocular capsule, and is partially divided into five locules, with irregular dehiscence by 3-5 teeth. Seeds are pear-shaped and rough, 2.5–3.0 mm (0.098–0.118 in) in diameter.

The 10–20 cm (3.9–7.9 in) glandular leaves, which uncoil from a central rosette, lack the power of movement common to most sundews, but have the unusual characteristic of coiling 'outward' when immature (outward circinate vernation). Seed germination may be aided by scarification.

== Distribution and habitat ==
Drosophyllum lusitanicum is native to the western Mediterranean region, through Portugal, southwest Spain and northern Morocco), and is one of the few carnivorous plants to grow in dry soil. It grows mainly in clearings of scrub (mainly heather), pine forests, evergreen forests (e.g. open cork oak) and sunny heaths. In dry places and silicon, gravel or shale substrates, somewhat disturbed. It is a strictly calcific species, from sea level up to 1,200 m (3,900 ft) in altitude.

== Ecology ==
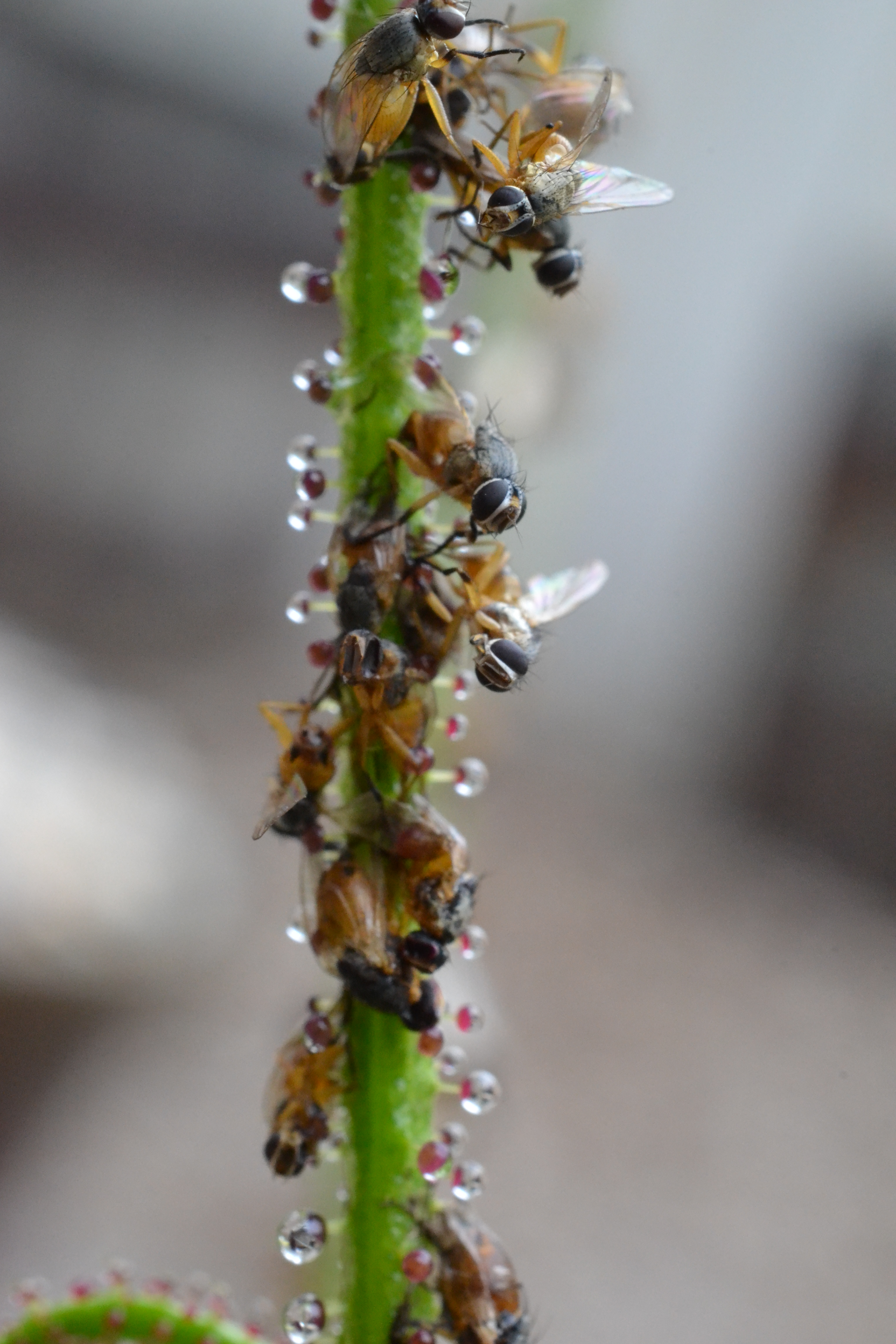
Insect prey stuck on the mucilaginous glands

The plant has a distinct sweet aroma, which attracts the insects upon which it preys. When insects land on the leaves, they find themselves stuck to the mucilage secreted by the stalked glands on the leaves. The more the insects struggle, the more ensnared they become, ultimately dying of suffocation or exhaustion. The plant then secretes enzymes which dissolve the insects and release the nutrients, which are then absorbed by the plant. The plant uses these nutrients to supplement the nutrient-poor soil in which it grows.

The genus had always been assumed to be closely allied to Drosera, and was previously placed in the Droseraceae. Recent molecular and biochemical studies, however, place it in the monotypic Drosophyllaceae, as recommended by the Angiosperm Phylogeny Group, and allied with the Dioncophyllaceae (Triphyophyllum) and Ancistrocladaceae.

== Classification ==
The APG system (1998) and APG II system (2003) assign Drosophyllaceae to the order Caryophyllales in the clade core eudicots. D. lusitanicum had previously always been included in the family Droseraceae, as it catches insects with a method reminiscent of that used by many plants in that family.

Recent molecular and biochemical evidence (see the AP-Website) suggests the carnivorous taxa in the order Caryophyllales (the families Droseraceae, Drosophyllaceae, Nepenthaceae, and the species Triphyophyllum peltatum) all belong to the same clade, which does not consist only of carnivorous plants, but also includes some noncarnivorous plants, such as those in the family Ancistrocladaceae.

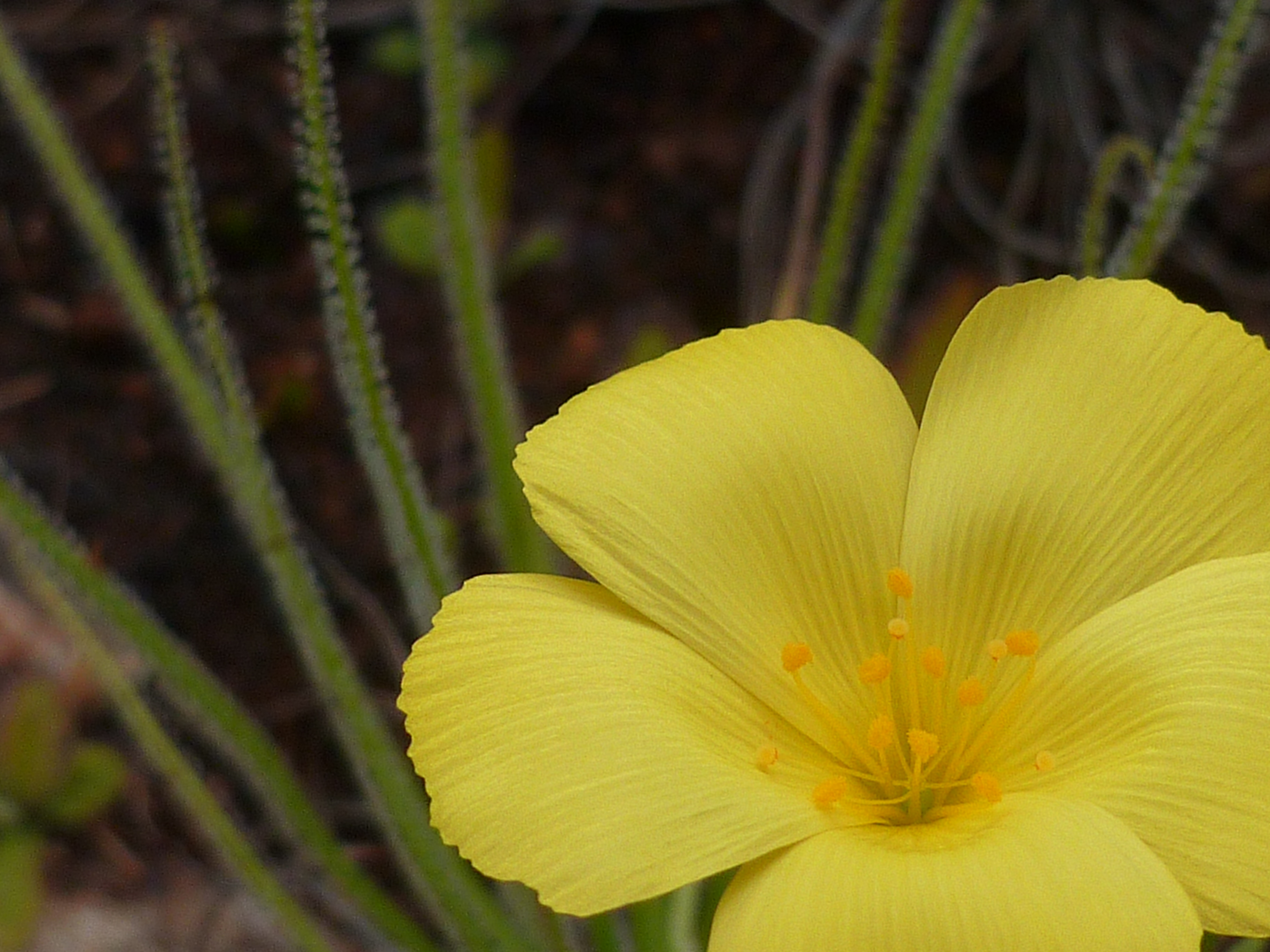
Drosophyllum lusitanicum flower

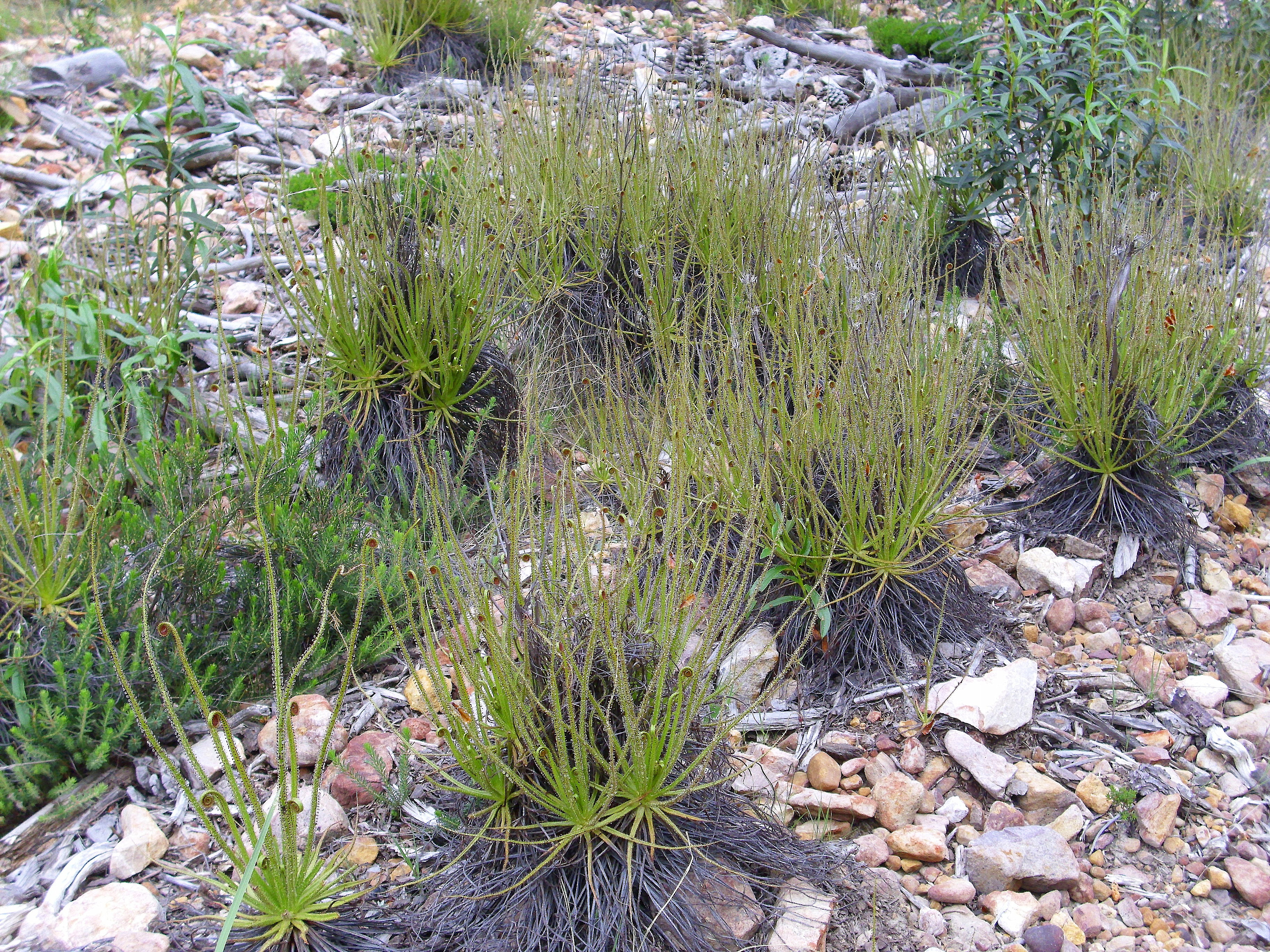
Drosophyllum lusitanicum in its native habitat in gravel soil

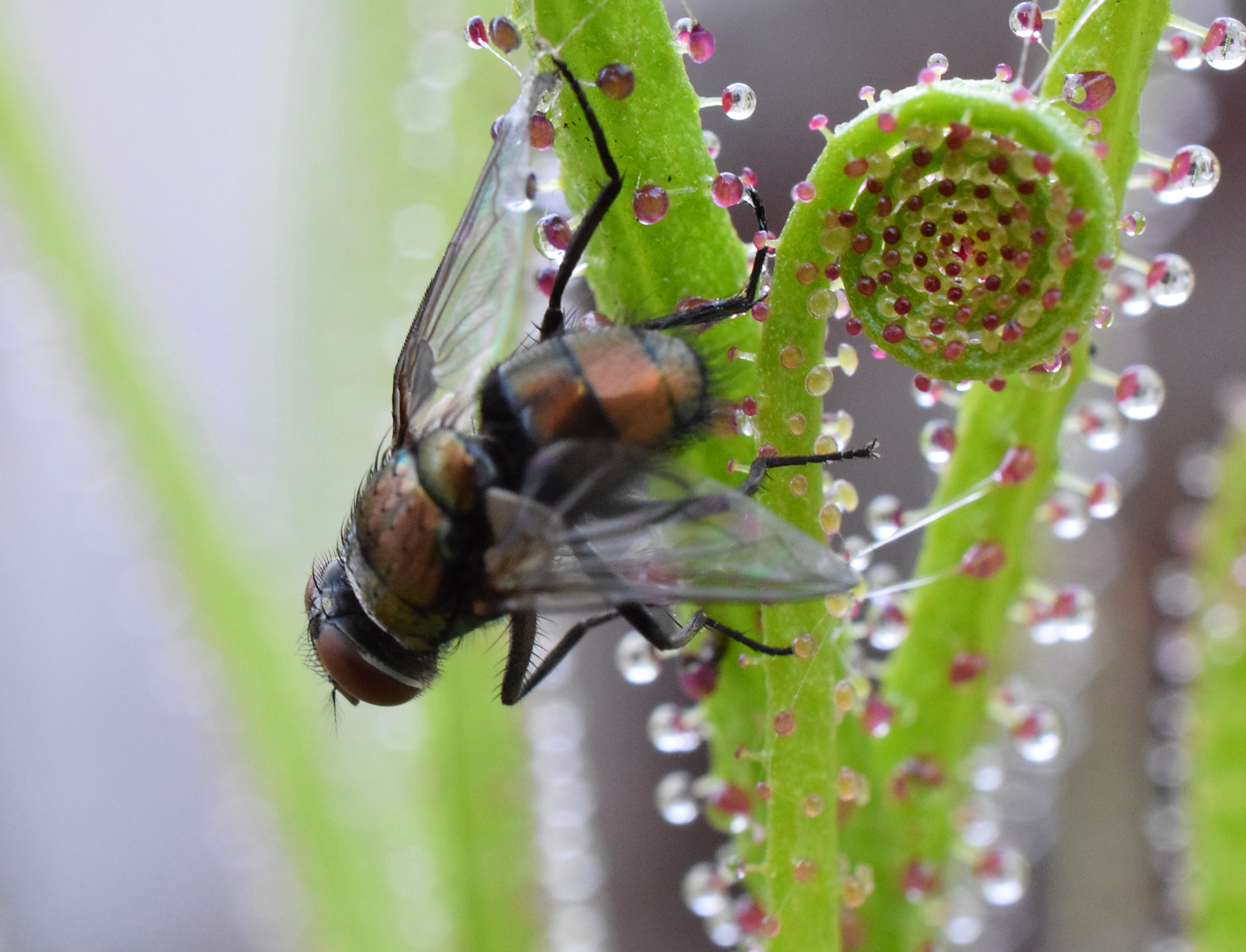
Detail of the coiling process and mucilaginous glands viscosity

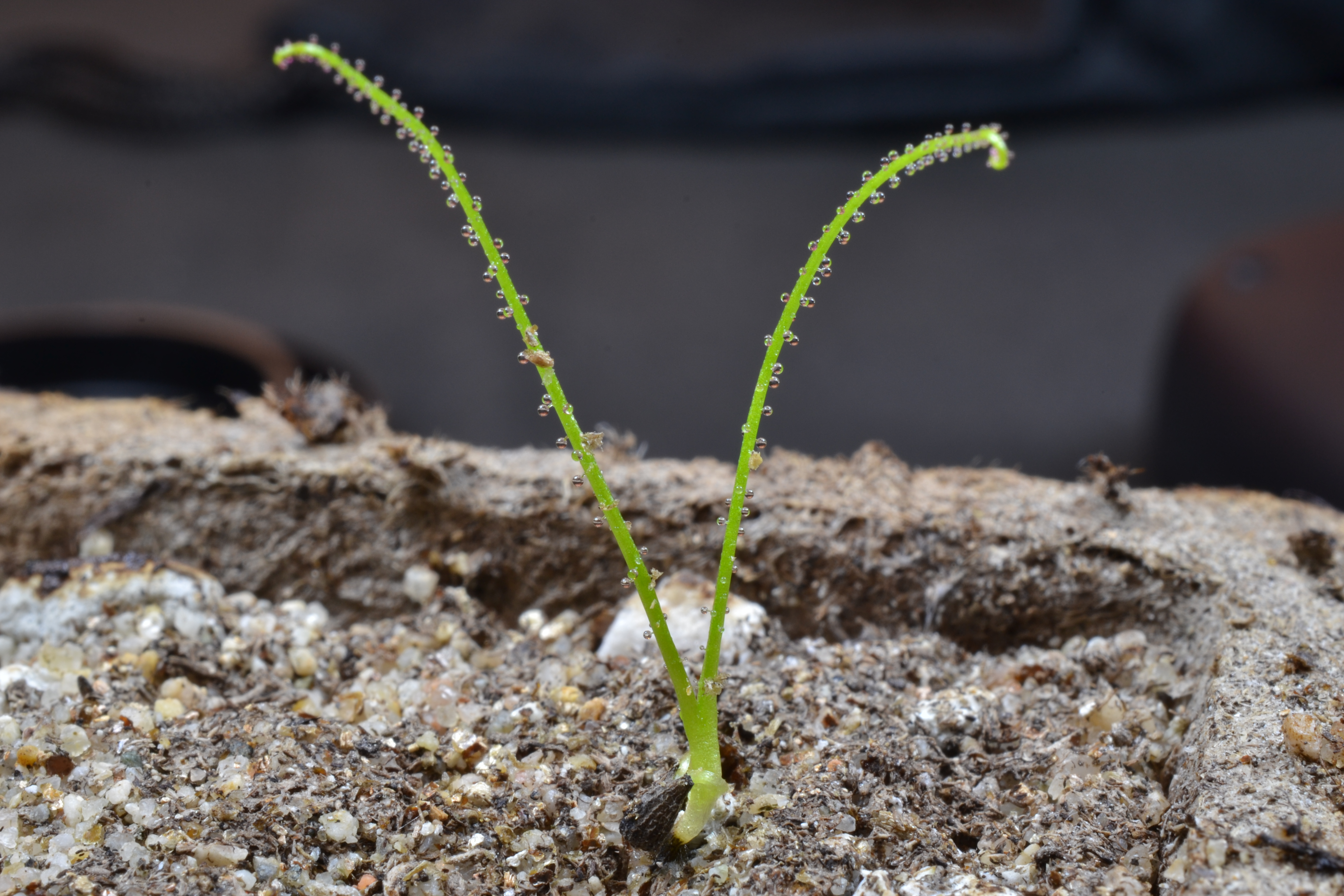
Drosophyllum lusitanicum seedling (note the pear-shaped seed on the bottom)

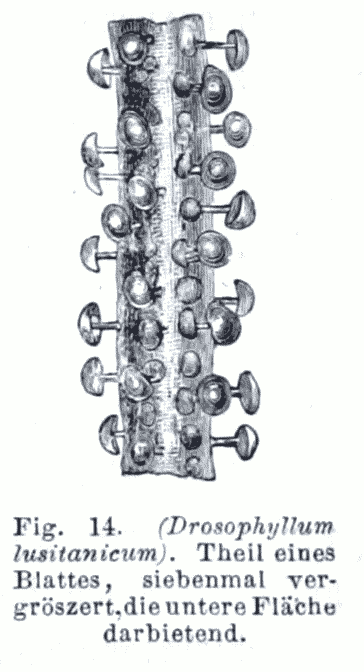
An illustration of the mucilaginous glands by Darwin
