= Dioncophyllum =

Scientific classification
- Kingdom: Plantae
- Clade: Tracheophytes
- Clade: Angiosperms
- Clade: Eudicots
- Order: Caryophyllales
- Family: Dioncophyllaceae
- Genus: Dioncophyllum; Baill. (1890)
- Species: D. thollonii

Binomial name
- Dioncophyllum thollonii Baill. (1890)

Genus of plants

Dioncophyllum is a monotypic genus of flowering plants belonging to the family Dioncophyllaceae. The only species is Dioncophyllum thollonii.

It is native to Gabon and Republic of the Congo in west-central tropical Africa.
