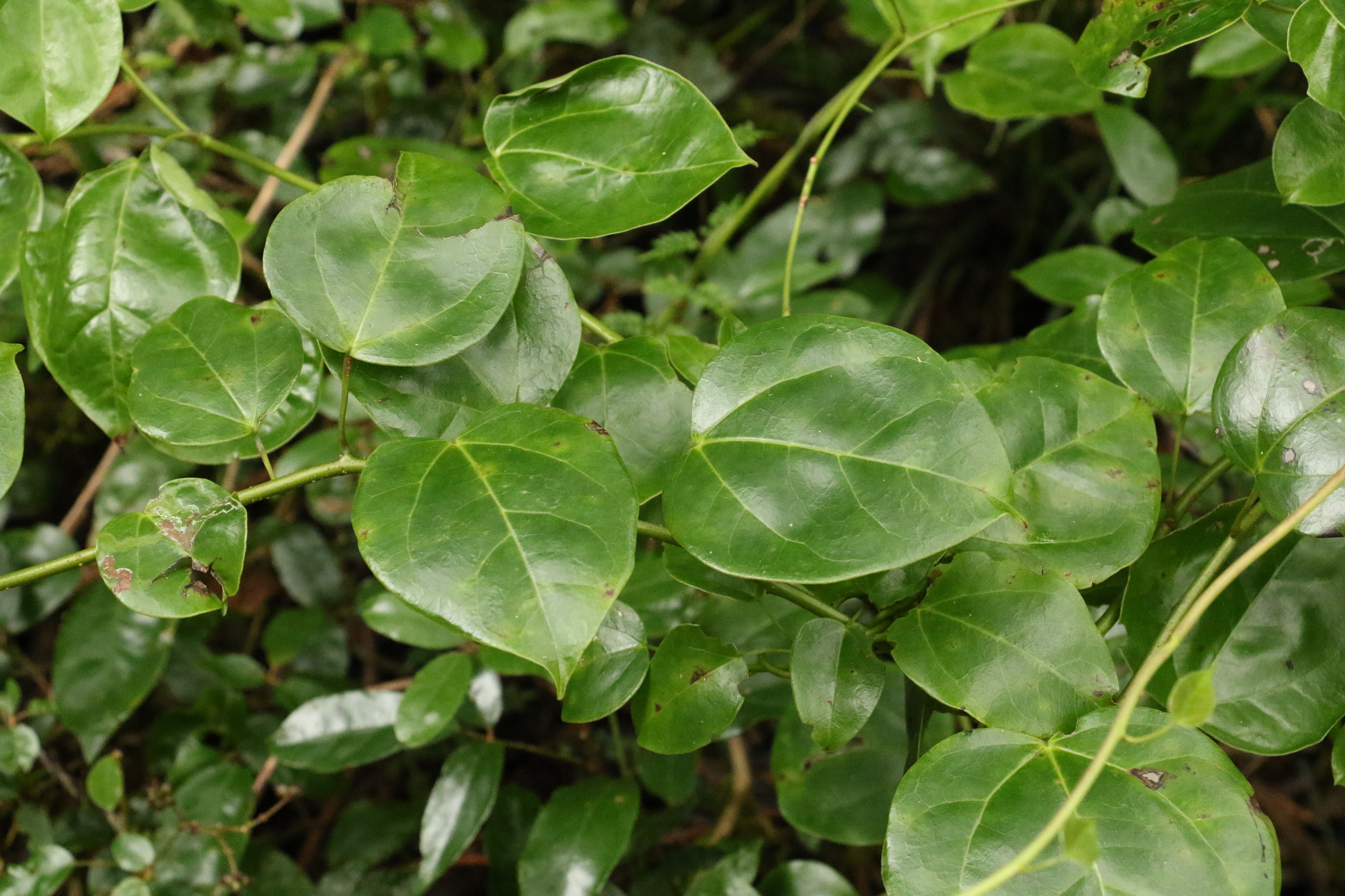

Scientific classification
- Kingdom: Plantae
- Clade: Tracheophytes
- Clade: Angiosperms
- Clade: Eudicots
- Order: Berberidopsidales
- Family: Berberidopsidaceae
- Genus: Streptothamnus; F.Muell.
- Species: S. moorei

Binomial name
- Streptothamnus moorei F.Muell.

= Streptothamnus =

Streptothamnus moorei

Genus of Berberidopsidaceae plants

Streptothamnus is a genus of flowering plants in the family Berberidopsidaceae. It has only one currently accepted species, Streptothamnus moorei, native to northern New South Wales and southeast Queensland, Australia. It is a scandent shrub found in forested montane areas.
