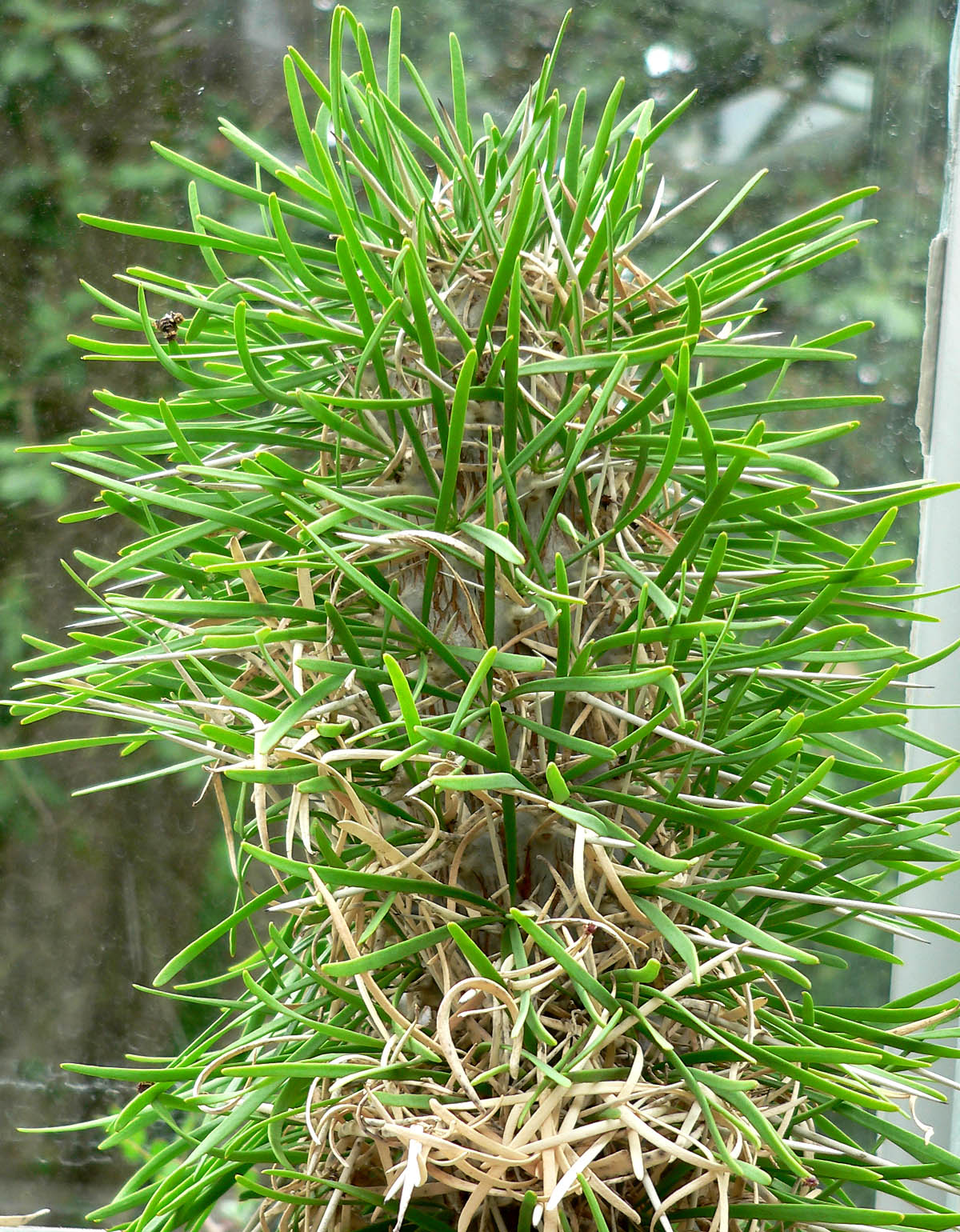

Conservation status
- Least Concern (IUCN 3.1)

Scientific classification
- Kingdom: Plantae
- Clade: Tracheophytes
- Clade: Angiosperms
- Clade: Eudicots
- Order: Caryophyllales
- Family: Didiereaceae
- Genus: Didierea
- Species: D. madagascariensis

Binomial name
- Didierea madagascariensis Baill.

Synonyms
- Didierea mirabilis Baill.

= Didierea madagascariensis =

Species of flowering plant

Didierea madagascariensis, commonly known as the octopus tree, is a species of Didiereaceae endemic to the spiny thickets of southwestern Madagascar. It was first described scientifically by the French botanist Henri Ernest Baillon in 1880 and is the type species of the genus Didierea.

It is known in Malagasy as sohongy, sony and soribarika. Sohongy and sony come from the Tanosy dialect word songo meaning "lock of hair" or a rooster's crest or comb possibly referring to its branches that sprawl upwards.

== Description ==
As with all members of the sub-family Didiereoideae, this is a semi-succulent woody, shrub to small tree. It is densely spiny and can grow up to 10 metres (33 ft) tall. Spines are arranged in whorls, mostly of four. Leaves are small and narrow-lanceolate and arranged in rosettes.
