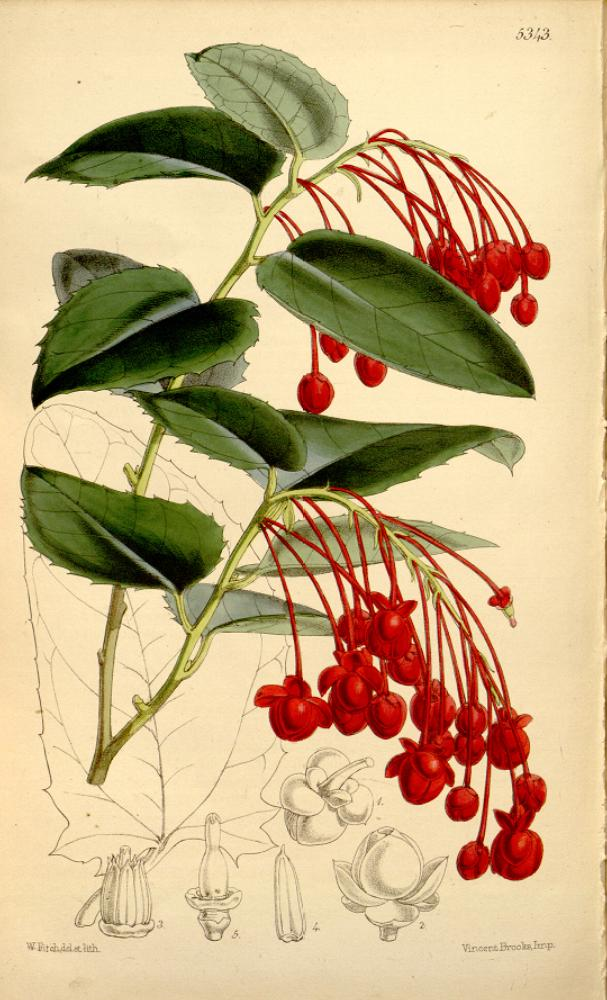

Scientific classification
- Kingdom: Plantae
- Clade: Tracheophytes
- Clade: Angiosperms
- Clade: Eudicots
- Order: Berberidopsidales
- Family: Berberidopsidaceae; Takht.

Genera
- Berberidopsis; Streptothamnus

= Berberidopsidaceae =

Family of flowering plants

Berberidopsidaceae is a family of flowering plants. Such a family has only recently been recognized by more than a few taxonomists: the plants involved have often been treated as belonging to family Flacourtiaceae.

The APG II system, of 2003 (unchanged from the APG system, of 1998), does recognize this family, unplaced as to order and merely assigned to the clade core eudicots. The family consists of one or two genera, Berberidopsis, with two species (B. beckleri and B. corallina) and Streptothamnus, with a single species (S. moorei).

However, APG II mentions the possibility of recognizing an order Berberidopsidales, which would comprise the two families Aextoxicaceae and Berberidopsidaceae. The APG III system of 2009 formally recognized the order Berberidopsidales and placed Aextoxicaceae and Berberidopsidaceae in it.
