= Arjona megapotamica =

Scientific classification
- Kingdom: Plantae
- Clade: Tracheophytes
- Clade: Angiosperms
- Clade: Eudicots
- Order: Santalales
- Family: Schoepfiaceae
- Genus: Arjona
- Species: A. megapotamica

Binomial name
- Arjona megapotamica Malme

Synonyms
- According to Flora del Conosur: Arjona brasiliensis K.Schum.; Arjona schumanniana Pilg.

Species of plant

Arjona megapotamica is a rare species of flowering plant in the family Schoepfiaceae, native to a small area of southeastern Brazil, where it grows in cool mountain grasslands. Like other Arjona species, it is thought to be a root hemiparasite. It is a small perennial plant growing as a bunch of short twigs from a woody central knob. As of December 2021, Arjona schumanniana was regarded by some sources as a synonym, by others as an independent species.

== Description ==
Arjona megapotamica is a small, herbaceous, perennial root hemiparasite. A large number of unbranched stems, 15–20(–30) cm in height, sprout from a small woody central base, called a 'xylopodium'. These stems are 1–1.5 cm in diameter, sulcate (grooved in transect profile) and glabrous (hairless). The linear leaves are alternately distributed throughout the length of the stem. The leaves are simple, sessile, coloured green, glabrous, with the leaf blade 2–3 cm long and 1–1.5 cm wide. The leaves are tipped in a point, and have 1 to 3 prominent veins.

The stems are topped by a terminal inflorescence, shaped as a spiked raceme. It is about 2 cm in length and densely packed with flowers. The 0.6–2 cm long, linear bracts, are tipped in sharp points and villous along their margins. The flowers are sessile. They have two linear, villous bracteoles 2–3 mm in length. The perianth is tubular, hypocrateriform, yellow, 10–12 mm in length, a few trichomes dispersed internally, with five lobes. The five stamens have dorsifixed anthers, and are oblong. The ovary is pilose, about 2 mm in length, and with pendulous ovules, a filiform, glabrous style, and a slightly 3-lobulate stigma.

The ovoid fruit is ca. 3–4 mm in length with a truncated end and 10 ribs. The fruit, when eventually removed from or having fallen off the infructescence, leave an off-white scar at the base of the bract. The seeds have a cylindrical embryo.

== Taxonomy ==
Arjona megapotamica was described by Gustaf Malme in 1928, based on a specimen (the holotype) he had collected in 1901 on the Morro da Polícia, a hill overlooking the port city of Porto Alegre.

In 1916 Carl Skottsberg published an article on the genus Arjona, in which he noted that specimens in the Berlin Herbarium had been labelled by Karl Moritz Schumann as A. brasiliensis, but that he was unable to find a formal species description for the name. In 1930, Robert Pilger published a description of the specimens, which he noted had been collected by Friedrich Sellow sometime in early 19th century, under the name A. schumanniana. He rejected the epithet basiliensis, since he found that it was unclear whether the specimens had actually been collected in Brazil – Sellow had also travelled to Uruguay. As of December 2021, "Arjona brasiliensis" was not listed in the International Plant Names Index, while A. schumanniana was accepted as a separate species by Plants of the World Online. Both these names are regarded as synonyms of A. megapotamica by the Flora del Conosur. A. schumanniana was synonymised with A. megapotamica by the Brazilian botanist João Rodrigues de Mattos in the Santalales volume of the Flora Ilustrada Catarinense of 1967.

Although A. megapotamica had not yet been named in 1916, Skottsberg placed "A. brasiliensis" in his section Xylarjona, based on the woody xylopodium, together with A. longifolia.

== Distribution ==
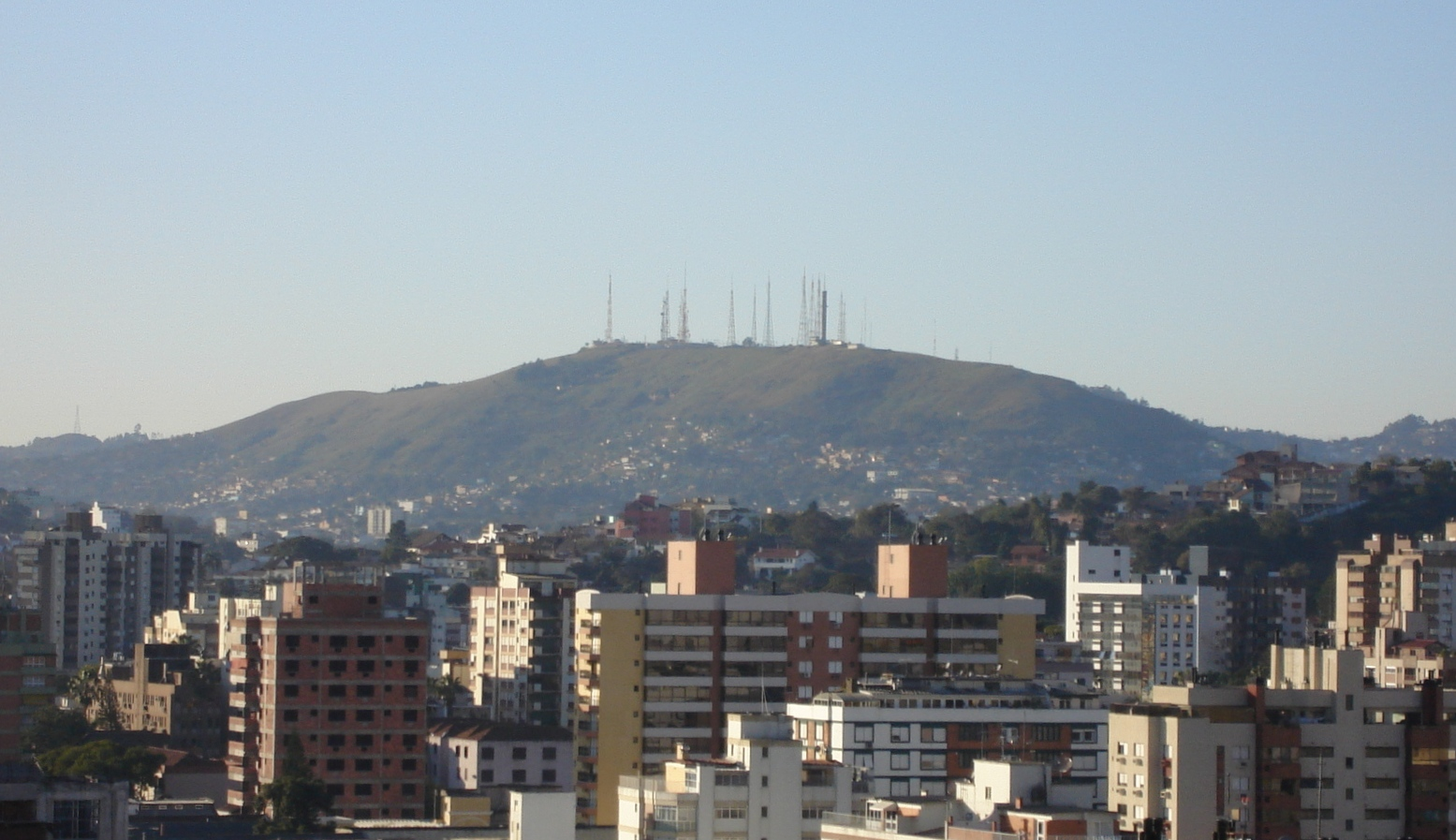
Morro da Polícia, seen from the Menino Deus neighbourhood of Porto Alegre, is the original collection locale of the holotype, it no longer occurs here.

Arjona megapotamica is endemic to southeastern Brazil. The species formerly occurred in the state of Rio Grande do Sul on granite hills which surround the coastal city of Porto Alegre. These hills have now been extensively developed, and the species was officially declared locally extinct in Rio Grande do Sul in 2014 (Decreto Estadual RS 52.109). It also occurs in the eastern part of the Santa Catarina Plateau in Santa Catarina state according to Mattos, where it presumably may still be found.

== Ecology ==
It is a root hemiparasite growing in cool montane grasslands. On Morro da Polícia, a 286 m high granite hill, it grew in a shrubby montane grassland. In Santa Catarina it has been collected at 1,670 m altitude in the Serra Geral (Urubici municipality), and 950 m in Lages municipality.

== Conservation ==
It occurs in Aparados da Serra National Park.
