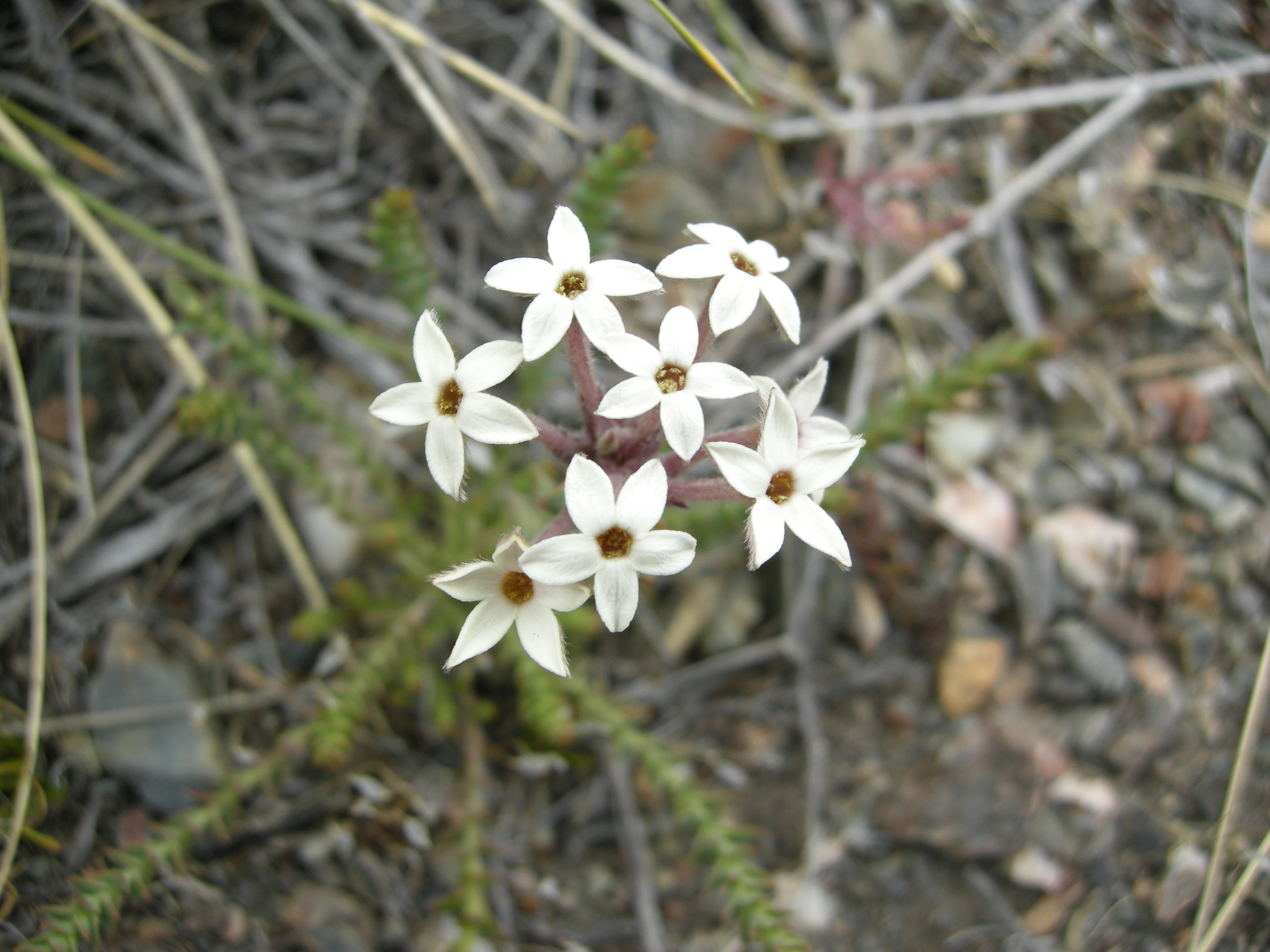

Scientific classification
- Kingdom: Plantae
- Clade: Tracheophytes
- Clade: Angiosperms
- Clade: Eudicots
- Order: Santalales
- Family: Schoepfiaceae
- Genus: Arjona
- Species: A. patagonica

Binomial name
- Arjona patagonica Hombr. & Jacquinot ex Decne.

Synonyms
- Arjona chubutensis Dusén; Arjona ruscifolia Poepp.; Arjona tuberosa var. patagonica DC.; Arjona andina Phil.; Arjona rigida Miers; Arjona tuberosa sensu Phil., auct. non Cav.

= Arjona patagonica =

Species of flowering plant

Arjona patagonica is a species of flowering plant in the family Schoepfiaceae native to southern South America.

== Taxonomy ==
Arjona patagonica was given its scientific name by Jacques Bernard Hombron, but a full species description was published by Joseph Decaisne in 1853 in the second volume of botany of the Voyage au Pôle Sud et dans l'Océanie sur les corvettes l'Astrolabe et la Zélée. In the title page of this book, both Hombron and Honoré Jacquinot are credited as authors, although this apparently may have been in error. Either way, only Hombron is credited as authority for the name A. patagonica by Decaisne.

A. rigida was described in 1878 in order to replace the A. tuberosa described by Rodolfo Amando Philippi in 1864, the plant described by Philippi was not the A. tuberosa originally described by Antonio José Cavanilles. It was later regarded as a synonym of A. patagonica.

Carl Skottsberg placed A. patagonica in his section Euarjona in 1916, together with A. tuberosa.

== Distribution ==
In Argentina it has been collected in the provinces of Buenos Aires, Chubut, La Pampa, Mendoza, Neuquén, Río Negro, San Juan, Santa Cruz and Tierra del Fuego. In Chile it has been collected in the regions of Araucanía, Coquimbo, Libertador Bernardo O'Higgins, Magallanes and Valparaíso.

== Uses ==
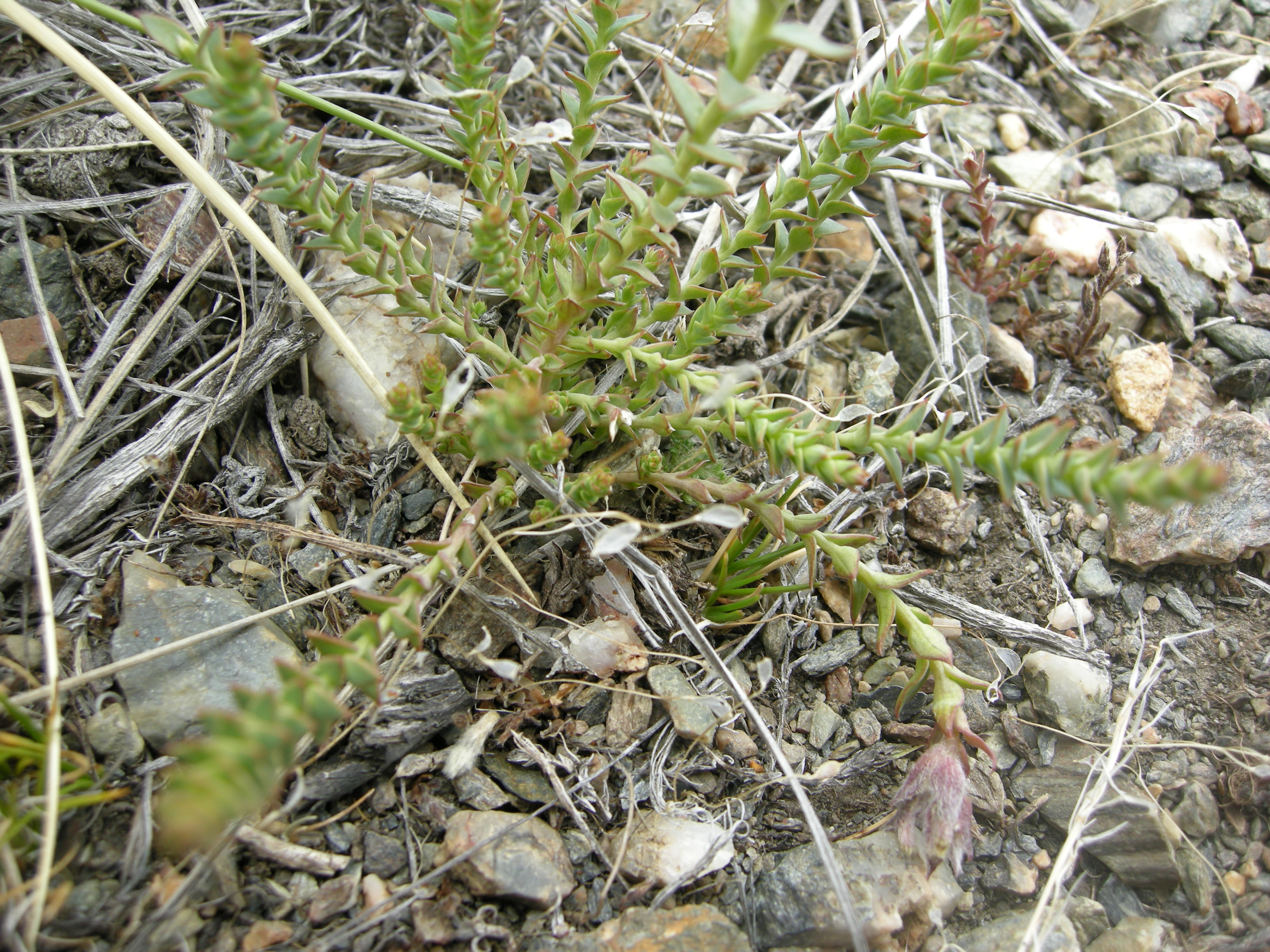
Arjona patagonica on the Belgrano Peninsula, in the Perito Moreno National Park (Santa Cruz Province, Argentina). Note the stems arising from a central point.

According to a 1968 report by Martínez Crovetto on the (former) uses of plants (i.e. ethnobotany), this species formed an important part of the diet of the Selkʼnam people, who called it téen in their language, one of their only sources of carbohydrates. The tubers are 5 to 9mm wide, and up to 20 cm long. The tubers shrink to 2mm in diameter during flowering in Spring, and are best harvested in fall months of March and April. They contain mostly water and some polyphenols. The plant is eaten by livestock; it has been rated as nutritionally extremely poor as a fodder in terms of palatability, digestibility and crude protein content according to the 1987 Lara & Cruz system.
