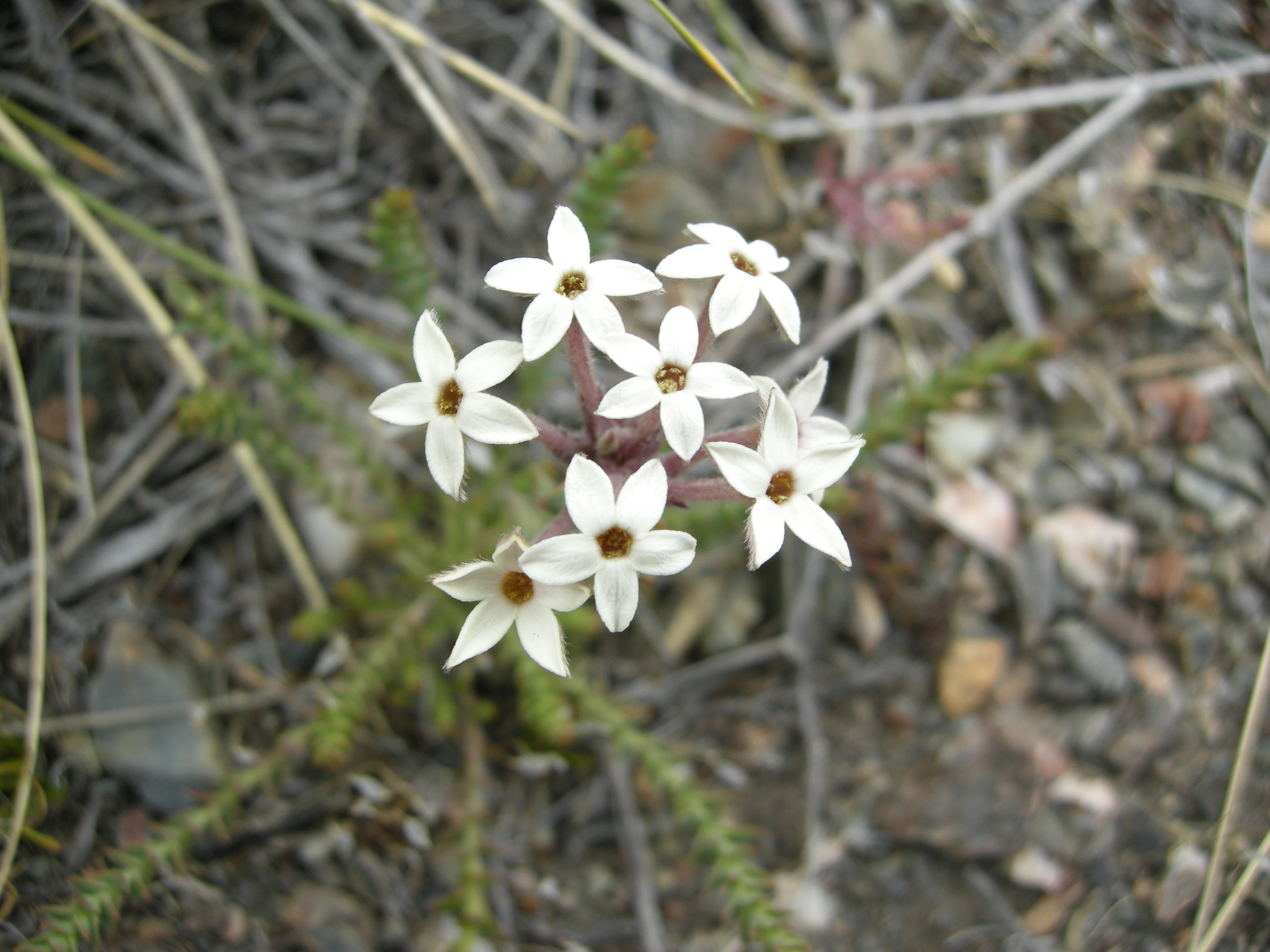
- Arjona patagonica

Scientific classification
- Kingdom: Plantae
- Clade: Tracheophytes
- Clade: Angiosperms
- Clade: Eudicots
- Order: Santalales
- Family: Schoepfiaceae
- Genus: Arjona; Cav.

= Arjona (plant) =

Genus of flowering plants

Arjona is a genus of flowering plants in the family Schoepfiaceae. They are hemiparasites.

== Taxonomy ==
As of December 2017, the following six species were recognized by the Plants of the World Online database:

- Arjona longifolia Phil. – northwest and south Argentina
- Arjona megapotamica Malme – Brazil (Santa Catarina, Rio Grande do Sul)
- Arjona patagonica Hombr. & Jacquinot ex Decne. – Argentina, central and south Chile
- Arjona pusilla Hook.f. – Peru, Bolivia, south Chile, northwest and south Argentina
- Arjona schumanniana Pilg. – south Brazil, Uruguay
- Arjona tuberosa Cav. – Argentina, Uruguay, south and central Chile

The Flora del Conosur does not accept A. schumanniana, which was synonymised with A. megapotamica by the Brazilian botanist João Rodrigues de Mattos in the Santalales volume of the Flora Ilustrada Catarinense of 1967.

A 2019 study of the genetics of the mainly Andean species of this genus was not able to include Arjona megapotamica (of which Arjona schumanniana was treated as a synonym). The results suggested that there are only one to three highly morphologically variable species, similar to the related genus Quinchamalium or the mistletoe species Tristerix corymbosus. Arjona megapotamica may be a separate valid species. The samples sequenced could be broadly placed in two regional groups, but these appear to be very closely related. Because the morphology of individual plants is so variable, it is difficult to identify a particular sample to a species, and the phenotypes exhibited by the individuals do not appear to be correlated to genetic clades. Nonetheless, a 1977 Ph.D. dissertation by Feur found diverse heteropolar pollen distinguishing species of Arjona.

== Description ==
The species all have tubers. These tubers are rhizomes, underground stems, not roots. The roots do not sprout exactly from the tuber itself, but from its uppermost part (the tubers may grow upside down, with the stems arising from the bottom), where it becomes the vegetative stems. In some species, such as Arjona pusilla, the rhizomes can branch and grow laterally, forming an underground mat of sorts. Others have napiform tubers, and others more long and thin tubers. The actual roots are small and thin, and have organs called 'haustoria', which are used to parasitise upon surrounding plants. All species grow a tuft of unbranched or weakly branched stems, topped eventually by an inflorescence.

== Distribution ==
The five or six species are found in southern South America, stretching from Tierra del Fuego in the south, north to Peru in the west, and southeastern Brazil in the east. Assuming A. schumanniana is not a valid species, Argentina has four species, Chile has three, Bolivia, Peru and Uruguay have a single species. Brazil has a single endemic species.

== Ecology ==
All species are found in open, not forested situations. Arjona patagonica and A. tuberosa appear to have broad habitat adaptability, but may prefer sandy soils. A. tuberosa var. tandilensis only appears to grow upon solitary hills of some 400-500m in height which rise above the pampas in some areas in central Argentina (La Pampa Province and Buenos Aires), or on higher, again solitary, mountains of 1500m in Córdoba Province or Uruguay. A. megapotamica is found on cold mountaintops in southeastern Brazil. All other species are found in dry climates, except A. pusilla, which is the only species to grow in wet environments.

Arjona species are root hemiparasites, able to derive a portion of their nutrition by having specialised organs on their roots which can attach to the roots of the host plants. The host plants involved generally appear to be species of grass.

A. tuberosa has relatively watery nectar, the sugars in it having a relatively high proportion of glucose and fructose, and a low percentage of sucrose. Its flowers are mostly visited by butterflies.

== Uses ==
The small tubers of Arjona patagonica were collected by the Selkʼnam people as a food in Patagonia. The tubers of Arjona tuberosa, called macachín, yaukuna or chaquil in various languages, are collected as a food by the inhabitants of the Monte Desert; these are largely non-indigenous Mapuche people, who began to colonise the area in the 17th century. The collectors are generally men (women stay at home now due to the schooling requirements of children) who raise cattle and travel through the desert in search of pasture during the summer season (transhumanism).
