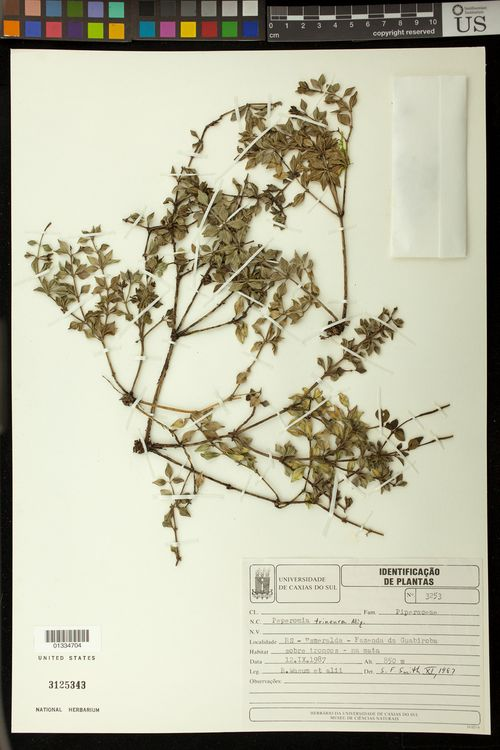

Scientific classification
- Kingdom: Plantae
- Clade: Tracheophytes
- Clade: Angiosperms
- Clade: Magnoliids
- Order: Piperales
- Family: Piperaceae
- Genus: Peperomia
- Species: P. trineura

Binomial name
- Peperomia trineura Miq.

Synonyms
- Peperomia quadrifolia Miq.; Peperomia trinervia Miq. ex C.DC.

= Peperomia trineura =

Species of flowering plant

Peperomia trineura is a species of epiphyte in the genus Peperomia that is found in Brazil & Ecuador. It primarily grows on wet tropical biomes. Its conservation status is Not Threatened.

== Description ==
The first specimens where collected in Brazil.

Peperomia topoensis has leathery-fleshy leaves, cartilaginous in the dry, growing and rooting above mosses, with erect, and di-trichotome branches. The stem and branches are tetragonal, furrowed, glabrous, knotted, and with internodes that are 1.5-5 cm long. The leaves are 4-8 cm wide, spreading or subreflexed, often subcarinate-complex. When dry, t is rigid-cartilaginous, shiny, on both sides impressed-glandular, sometimes black-punctate, with margins, very subtly ciliolate, subindex also towards the base that are very subtly pubescentIt has hairs that are deciduous in all ages, elliptic, rhomboid or lanceolate-elliptic, on both sides alternate, equal-sided. The base is acute with an obtuse tip that is 6-9 mm long and 4-6 wide. It is three-nerved, thick veins that runs through the middle carinate-prominent beneath. Its petioles are canaliculate at the front, very subtly hairy or often glabrous, with an annulus of articulated nodes that are 1-3 mm long. The catkins at the tip are single, straight, cylindrical, erect, supported by glabrous peduncles that are 3-4 cm long, 2 mm thick. The catkins are densely flowered and glabrous. The bracts are pedicellate, subrounded, and glabrous. There are two lateral stamens. The anthers are spherical with attached locules. The ovary is immersed in the pit, subantically stigmatized at the tip. The berries are oblong and shortly prostrate.

== Taxonomy and Naming ==
It was described in 1843 by Friedrich Anton Wilhelm Miquel in Systema Piperacearum, from specimens collected by Friedrich Sellow. It got its name from the description of its leaves, which means 3 nerves.

== Subtaxa ==
Following subtaxa are accepted.

- Peperomia trineura var. contracta Hensch.
- Peperomia trineura var. laxa Hensch.
- Peperomia trineura var. robustior Miq.

== Distribution and Habitat ==
It is found in Ecuador and Brazil. It grows on a epiphyte environment and is a herb. It grows on wet tropical biomes.

== Conservation ==
This species is assessed as Not Threatened, in a preliminary report.
