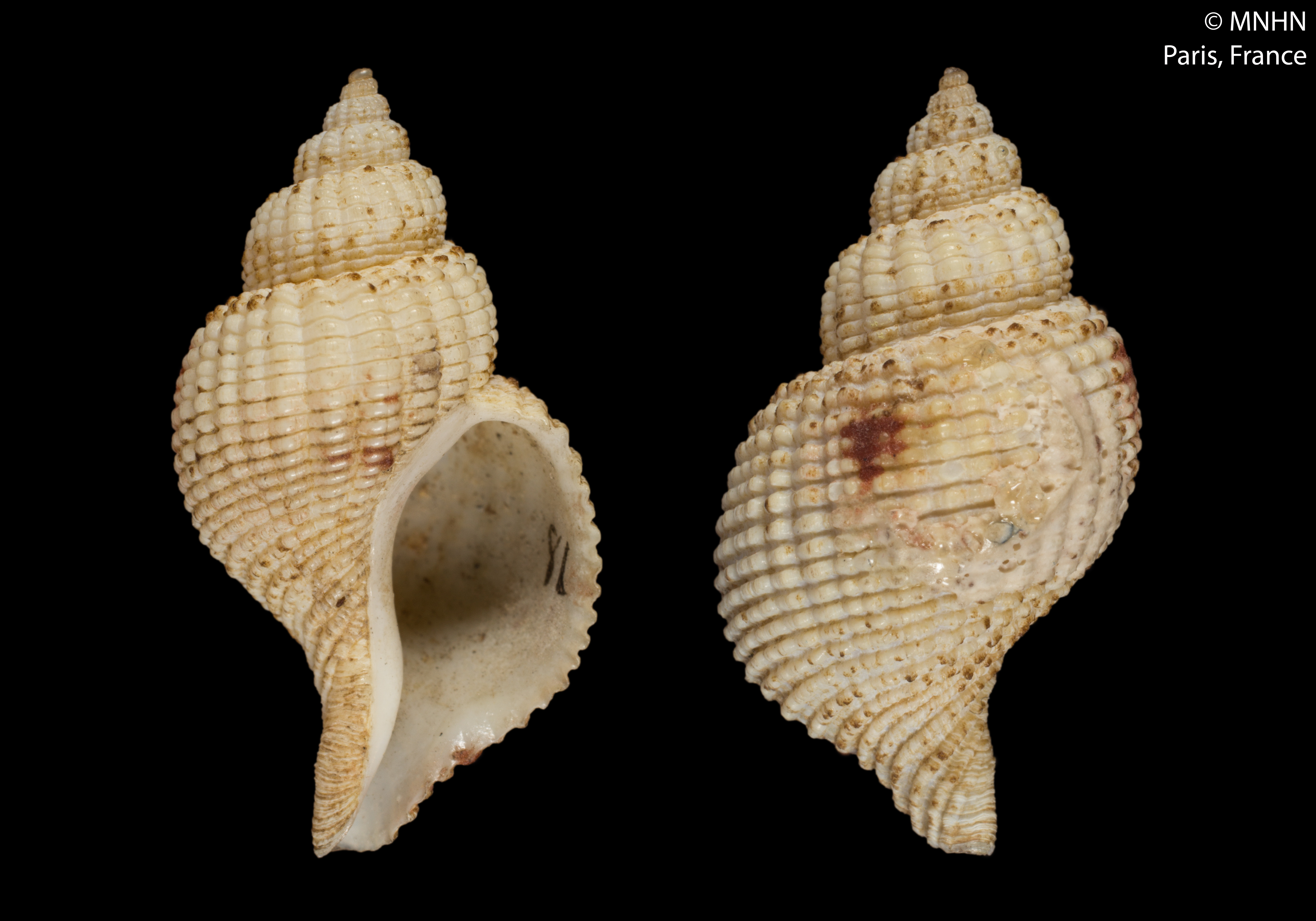
- Shell of Xymenopsis buccineus (holotype at MNHN, Paris)

Scientific classification
- Kingdom: Animalia
- Phylum: Mollusca
- Class: Gastropoda
- Subclass: Caenogastropoda
- Order: Neogastropoda
- Family: Muricidae
- Subfamily: Pagodulinae
- Genus: Xymenopsis
- Species: X. buccineus

Binomial name
- Xymenopsis buccineus (Lamarck, 1816)

Synonyms
- Fusus albidus Philippi, 1846; Fusus buccineus Lamarck, 1816; Fusus textiliosus Hombron & Jacquinot, 1843; Trichotropis antarctica Melvill & Standen, 1912 (Invalid: base on junior homonym of Trichotropis antarctica Thiele, 1912; Trichotropis bruceana Melvill & Standen, 1916 is a replacement name; Trichotropis bruceana Melvill & Standen, 1916 ·; Trophon ringei Strebel, 1904; Xymenopsis albidus (Philippi, 1846)

= Xymenopsis buccineus =

Species of gastropod

Xymenopsis buccineus is a species of sea snail, a marine gastropod mollusk in the family Muricidae, the murex snails or rock snails.

== Description ==
The length of the shell attains 38 mm.

== Distribution ==
This antarctic marine species occurs off the South Orkney Islands and in the Strait of Magellan; it is also found in the East China Sea.
