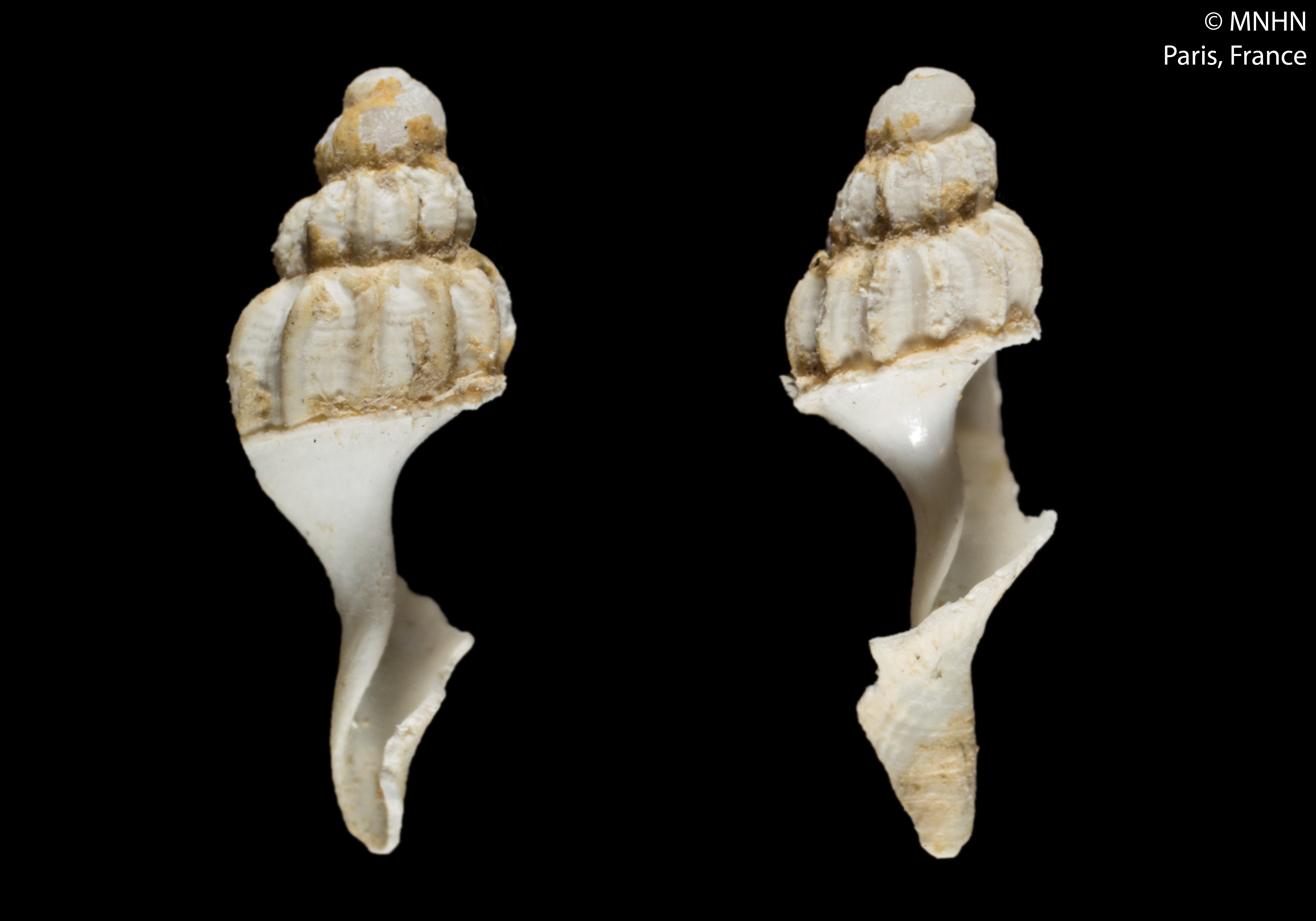

Scientific classification
- Kingdom: Animalia
- Phylum: Mollusca
- Class: Gastropoda
- Subclass: Caenogastropoda
- Order: Neogastropoda
- Family: Muricidae
- Subfamily: Pagodulinae
- Genus: Xymenopsis
- Species: X. tcherniai

Binomial name
- Xymenopsis tcherniai (Gaillard, 1954)

Synonyms
- Pleurotoma (Pleurotomella) tcherniai Gaillard, 1954; Pleurotoma tcherniai Gaillard, 1954 (original combination); Pleurotomella tcherniai (Gaillard, 1954)

= Xymenopsis tcherniai =

Species of gastropod

Xymenopsis tcherniai is a species of sea snail, a marine gastropod mollusk in the family Muricidae, the murex snails or rock snails.

== Distribution ==
This marine species occurs off the Adelie Coast, Antarctica.
