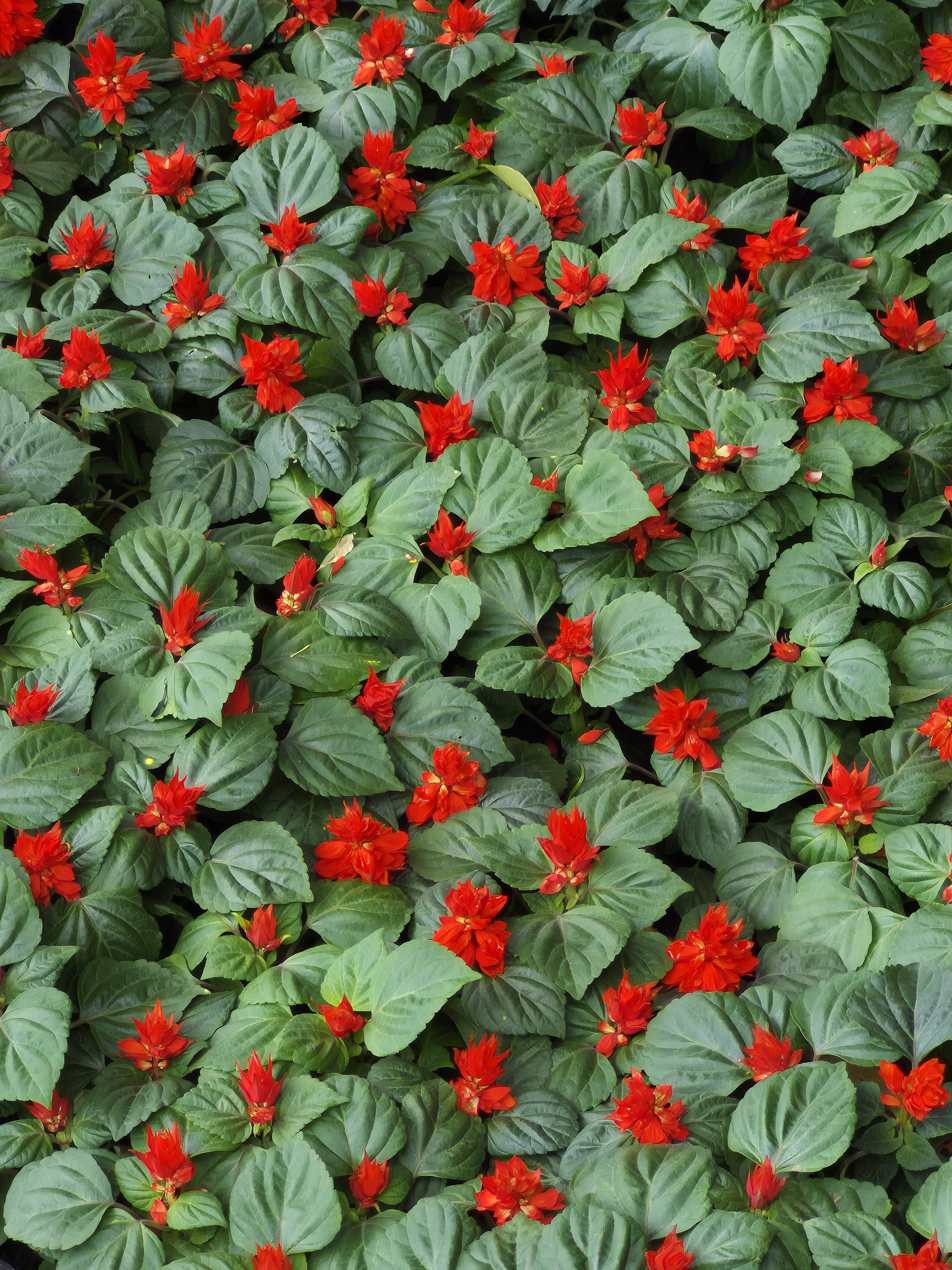
- Seedlings
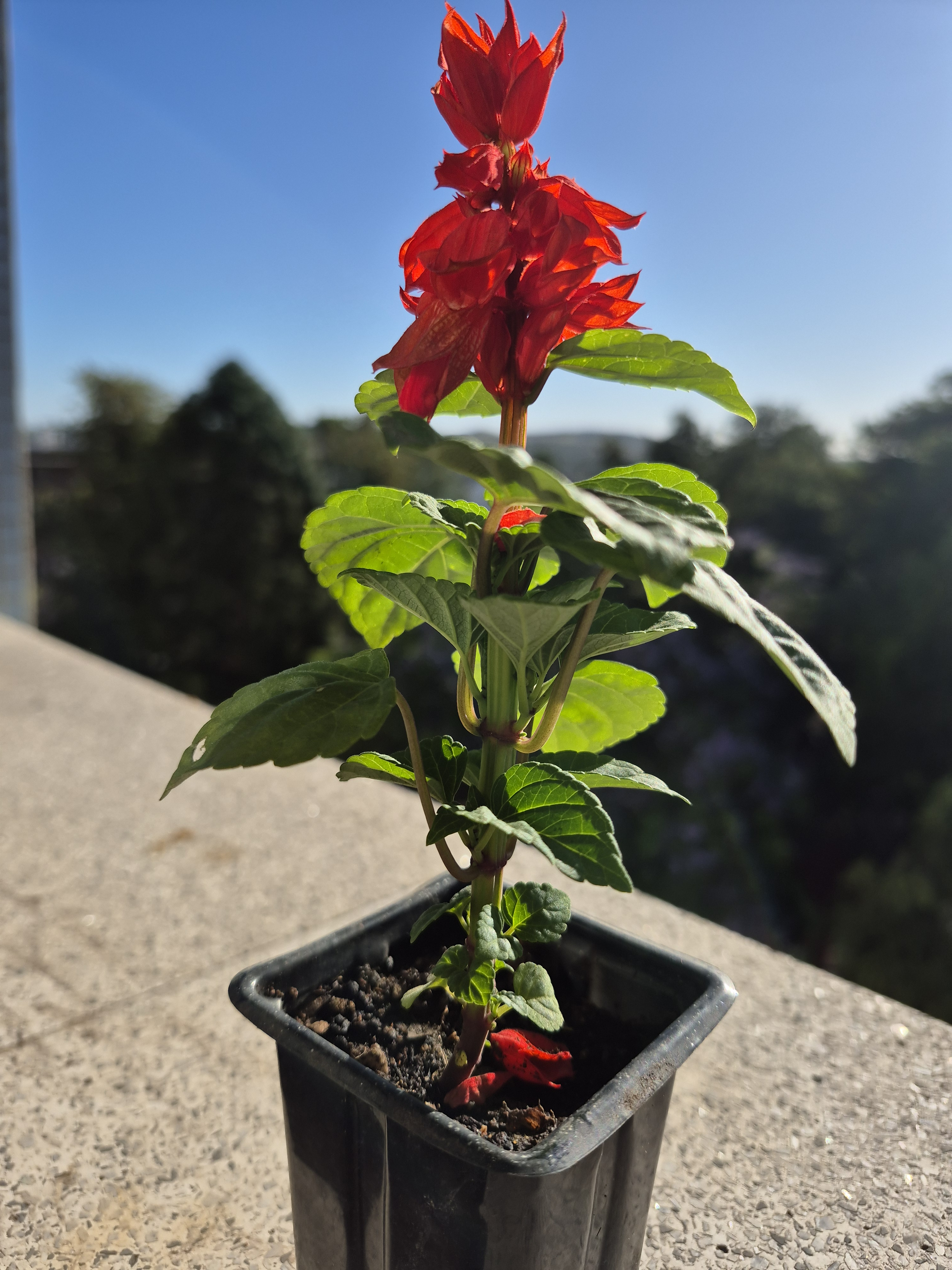

Scientific classification
- Kingdom: Plantae
- Clade: Tracheophytes
- Clade: Angiosperms
- Clade: Eudicots
- Clade: Asterids
- Order: Lamiales
- Family: Lamiaceae
- Genus: Salvia
- Species: S. splendens

Binomial name
- Salvia splendens Sellow ex J.A. Schultes

= Salvia splendens =

Species of flowering plant

Salvia splendens, the scarlet sage, is a tender herbaceous perennial plant native to Brazil, growing at 2,000 to 3,000 m (6,600 to 9,800 ft) elevation where it is warm year-round and with high humidity. The wild form, rarely seen in cultivation, reaches 1.3 m (4.3 ft) tall. Smaller cultivars are very popular as bedding plants, seen in shopping malls and public gardens all over the world.

== Taxonomy ==
Salvia splendens was first described and named in 1822, when it was given the common name "Lee's scarlet sage." Before dwarf cultivars were developed, an early Dutch selection known as 'Van Houttei' was introduced and remains popular in the horticultural trade.

== Description ==
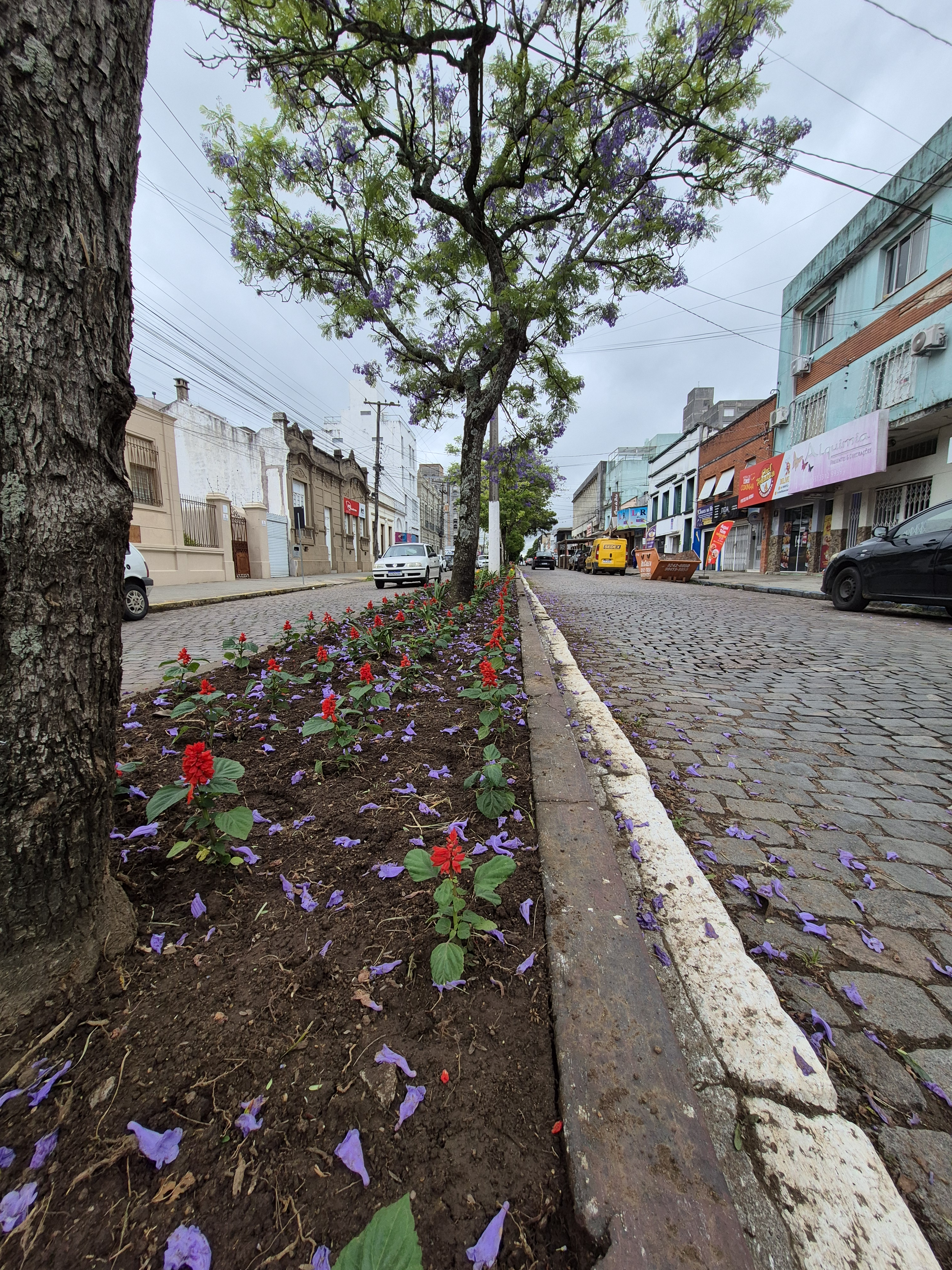
In a street in Brazil

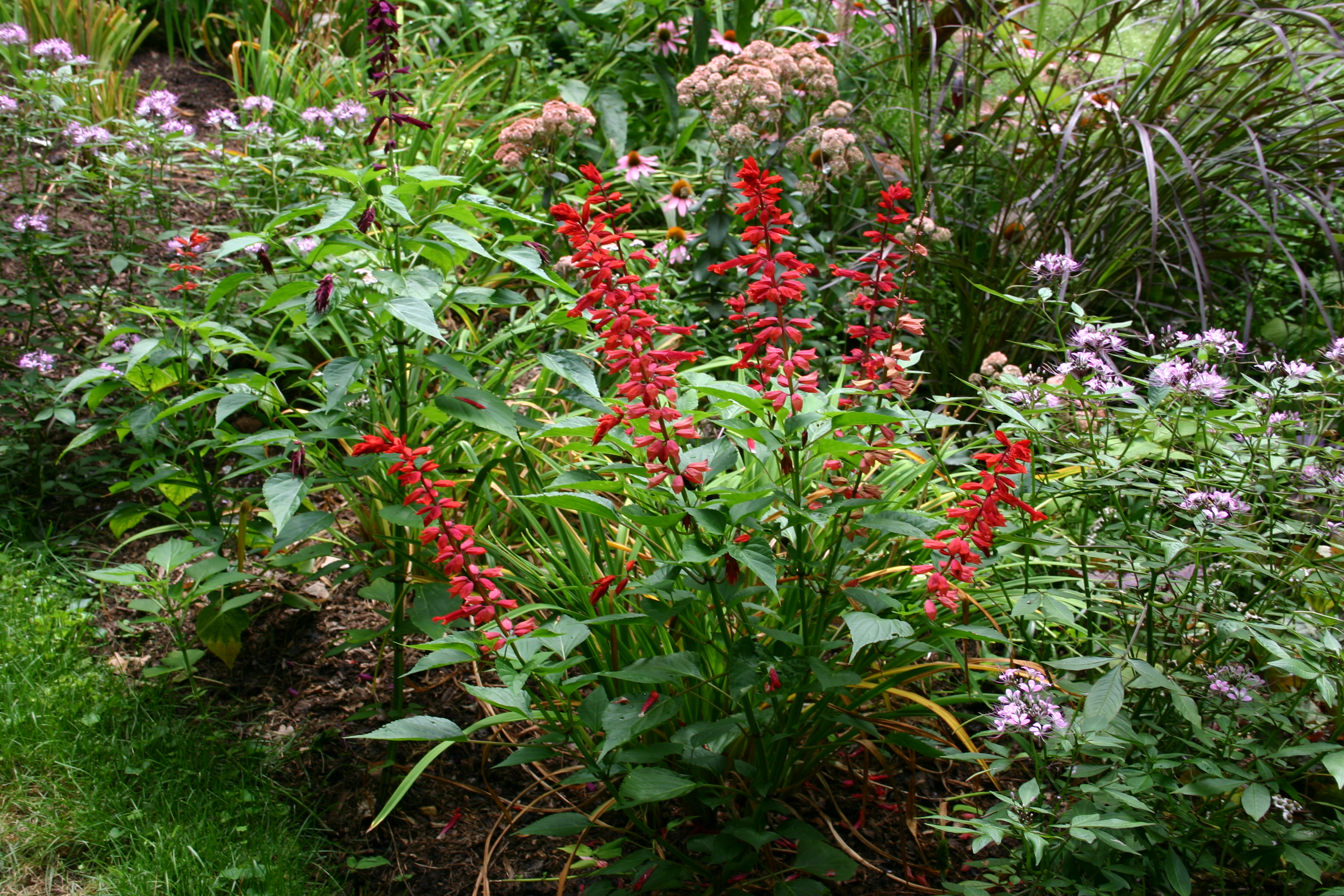
S. splendens 'Van Houttei'

The native type is rarely used or described, though it grew from 1.3 m (4.3 ft) in height. Its leaves are in even, elliptical arrangements, 7 × 5 cm, with dentate margin and long petioles. It may branch, where upper branches are finely hairy and lower parts hairless. Erect spikes of flowers sprout from the centre of the plant in groups of 2 to 6 from each leaf node; scarlet, tubular or bell-shaped, 35 mm long, with two lobes towards the apex; the upper lobe is 13 mm long. It flowers a good part of summer and autumn.

Exhibition of Flower Festival, Taichung, Taiwan

== Cultivation ==
It is widely grown as an ornamental plant, with a large number of cultivars selected by different colours from white to dark purple. It is a subtropical species that does not survive freezing temperatures, but can grow in cold climates as an annual plant. The most common selections are the dwarf sizes that go by names such as 'Sizzler' and 'Salsa', and planted en masse in gardens and malls. 'Van Houttei' reaches 1 to 1.3 m (3.3 to 4.3 ft) in height. The various types typically have red flowers.

=== Cultivars ===
Named cultivars include:

- S. splendens 'Alba', with white flowers
- 'Atropurpurea', with dark violet to purple flowers
- 'Atrosanguinea', flowers dark red
- 'Bicolor', flowers white and red
- 'Bruantii', small, with red flowers
- 'Compacta', small, flowers in dense racemes, white or red
- 'Grandiflora', large, with large red flowers
- 'Issanchon', small, with white flowers striped pink to red
- 'Nana', an early-flowering cultivar, with red blossoms
- 'Scarlet Pygmy', a very dwarf, early flowering seed race with intense scarlet blossoms
- 'Semperflorens', continuous flowering
- 'Souchetii', small, with white or red flowers
- 'St. John's Fire', dwarf plants with dense, abundant, scarlet, early-flowering, long-lasting blossoms
- 'Violacea', flowers dark violet to purple.

The cultivars 'Vanguard' and 'Van-Houttei' have gained the Royal Horticultural Society's Award of Garden Merit.
