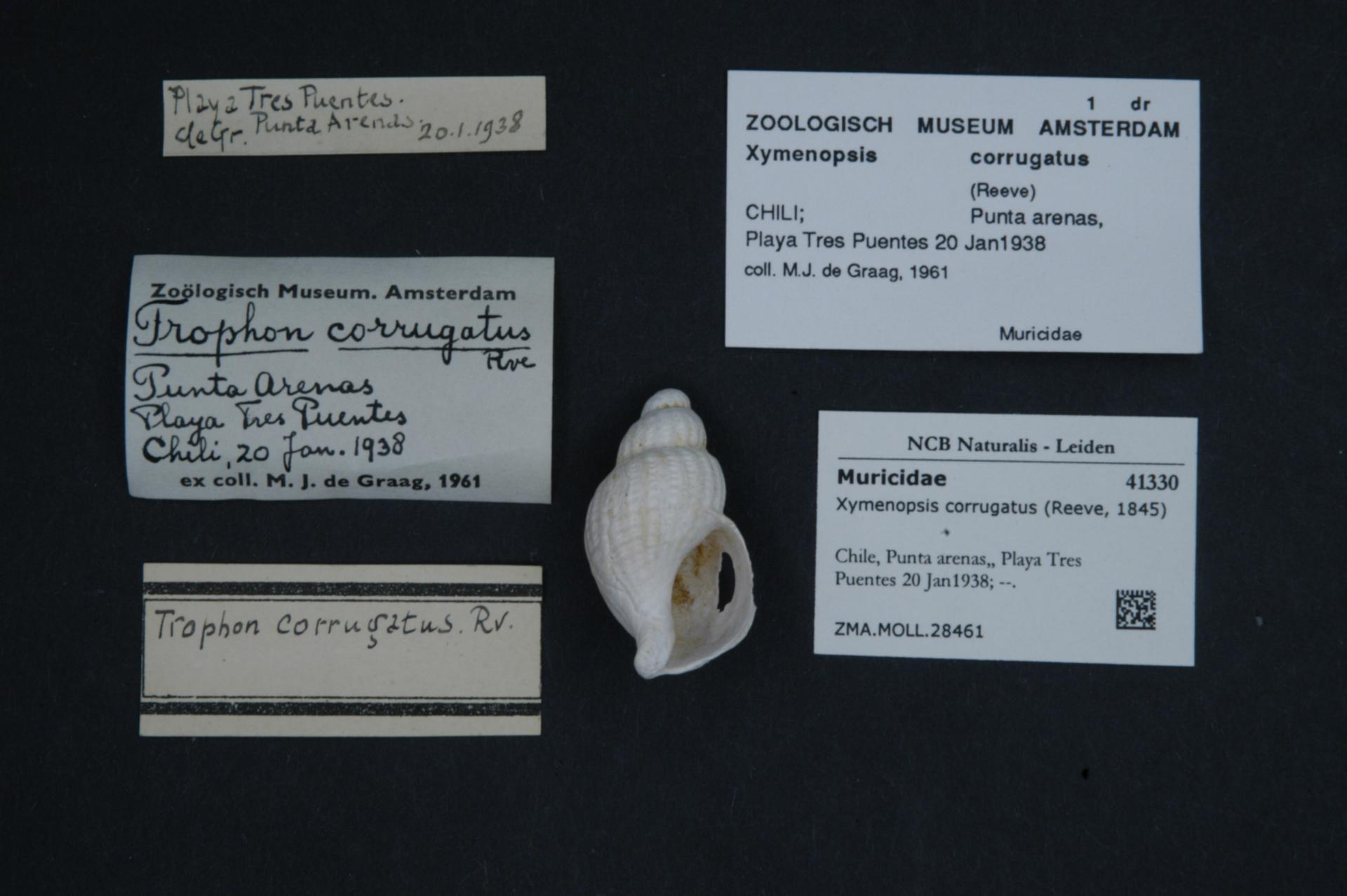

Scientific classification
- Kingdom: Animalia
- Phylum: Mollusca
- Class: Gastropoda
- Subclass: Caenogastropoda
- Order: Neogastropoda
- Family: Muricidae
- Subfamily: Pagodulinae
- Genus: Xymenopsis
- Species: X. corrugata

Binomial name
- Xymenopsis corrugata (Reeve, 1845)

Synonyms
- Fusus corrugatus Reeve, 1845; Trophon brucei Strebel, 1904; Trophon cribellum Strebel, 1908; Trophon elongatus Strebel, 1904; Trophon falklandicus Strebel, 1908; Trophon hoylei Strebel, 1904; Trophon ornatus Strebel, 1904; Trophon standeni Strebel, 1904; Xymenopsis corrugatus [sic] (incorrect gender ending)

= Xymenopsis corrugata =

Species of gastropod

Xymenopsis corrugata is a species of sea snail, a marine gastropod mollusc in the family Muricidae, the murex snails or rock snails. They reproduce sexually. They are more commonly known as Hoyle's Trophon.

== Description ==
The length of the shell attains 42 mm. The shell contains a light tan color.

== Distribution ==
Xymenopsis corrugata is found off Tierra del Fuego in southern Chile and the Falkland Islands in marine environments.
