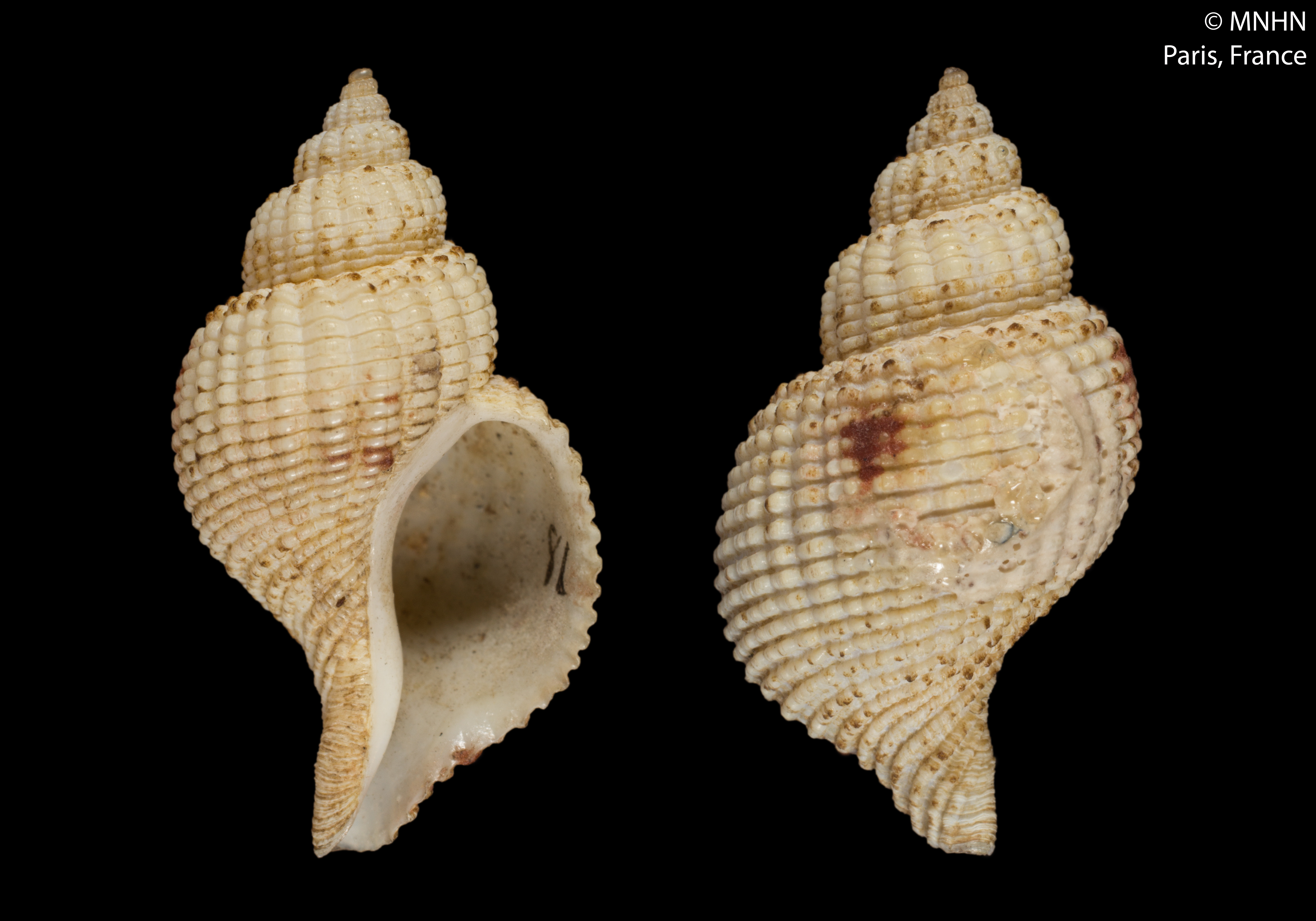
- Shell of Xymenopsis buccineus

Scientific classification
- Kingdom: Animalia
- Phylum: Mollusca
- Class: Gastropoda
- Subclass: Caenogastropoda
- Order: Neogastropoda
- Superfamily: Muricoidea
- Family: Muricidae
- Subfamily: Pagodulinae
- Genus: Xymenopsis; Powell, 1951

Type species
- Fusus liratus Gould, 1849

= Xymenopsis =

Genus of gastropods

Xymenopsis is a genus of sea snails, marine gastropod mollusks in the subfamily Pagodulinae of the family Muricidae, the murex snails or rock snails.

== Species ==
Species within the genus Xymenopsis include:

- Xymenopsis buccineus (Lamarck, 1816)
- Xymenopsis corrugata (Reeve, 1845)
- Xymenopsis flechensis Brunet 1997
- † Xymenopsis heros Frassinetti & Covacevich, 1995
- Xymenopsis muriciformis (King & Broderip, 1833)
- Xymenopsis peninsularis Brunet 1997
- Xymenopsis quenseli Brunet 1997
- Xymenopsis subnodosus (Gray, 1839)
- Xymenopsis tcherniai (Gaillard, 1954)

Species brought into synonymy

- Xymenopsis albidus (Philippi, 1846): synonym of Xymenopsis buccineus (Lamarck, 1816)
- Xymenopsis corrugatus [sic]: synonym of Xymenopsis corrugata (Reeve, 1848)
