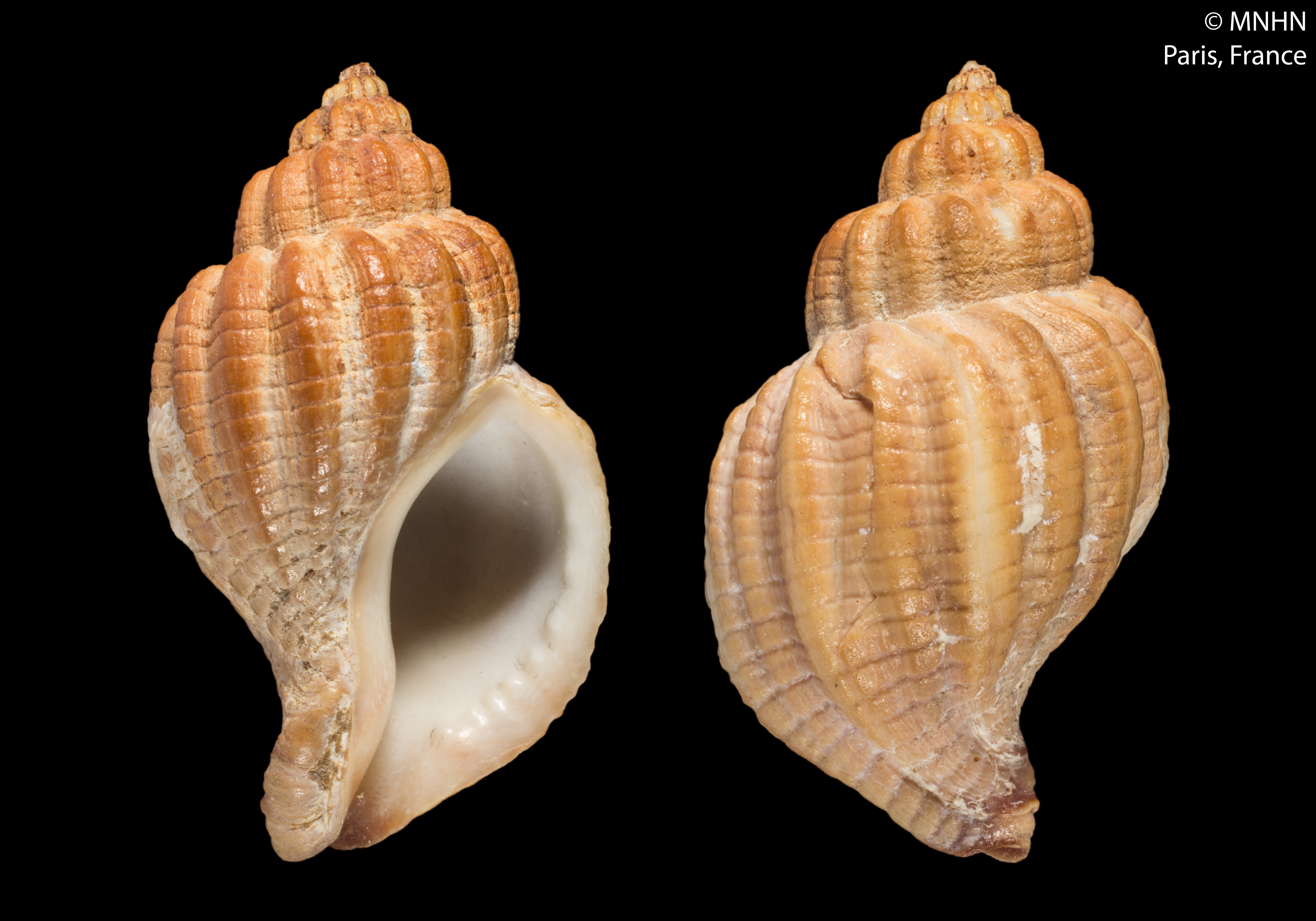

Scientific classification
- Kingdom: Animalia
- Phylum: Mollusca
- Class: Gastropoda
- Subclass: Caenogastropoda
- Order: Neogastropoda
- Family: Muricidae
- Subfamily: Pagodulinae
- Genus: Xymenopsis
- Species: X. muriciformis

Binomial name
- Xymenopsis muriciformis (King & Broderip, 1833)

Synonyms
- Buccinum cancellarioides Reeve, 1847; Buccinum muriciforme King & Broderip, 1832 (original combination); Buccinum muriciformis King & Broderip, 1833; Fusus decolor Philippi, 1845; Fusus liratus Gould, 1849; † Fusus liratus Philippi, 1887; Trophon acuminatus Strebel, 1904; Trophon albus Strebel, 1904; Trophon couthouyi Strebel, 1904; Trophon elegans Strebel, 1904; Trophon fenestratus Strebel, 1904; Trophon lebruni Mabille & Rochebrune, 1889; Trophon loebbeckei Kobelt & Küster, 1878; Trophon obesus Strebel, 1904; Trophon paessleri Strebel, 1904; Trophon paessleri turrita Strebel, 1904; Trophon pseudoelongatus Strebel, 1904; Trophon violaceus Mabille & Rochebrune, 1889

= Xymenopsis muriciformis =

Species of gastropod

Xymenopsis muriciformis is a species of sea snail, a marine gastropod mollusk in the family Muricidae, the murex snails or rock snails.

== Description ==
The length of the shell attains 42 mm.

(Described as Buccinum cancellarioides) The yellowish shell is ovately fusiform and rather thin. The whorls are rounded at the upper part, concentrically plicately ribbed and transversely engraved.

== Distribution ==
This marine species occurs off Argentina.
