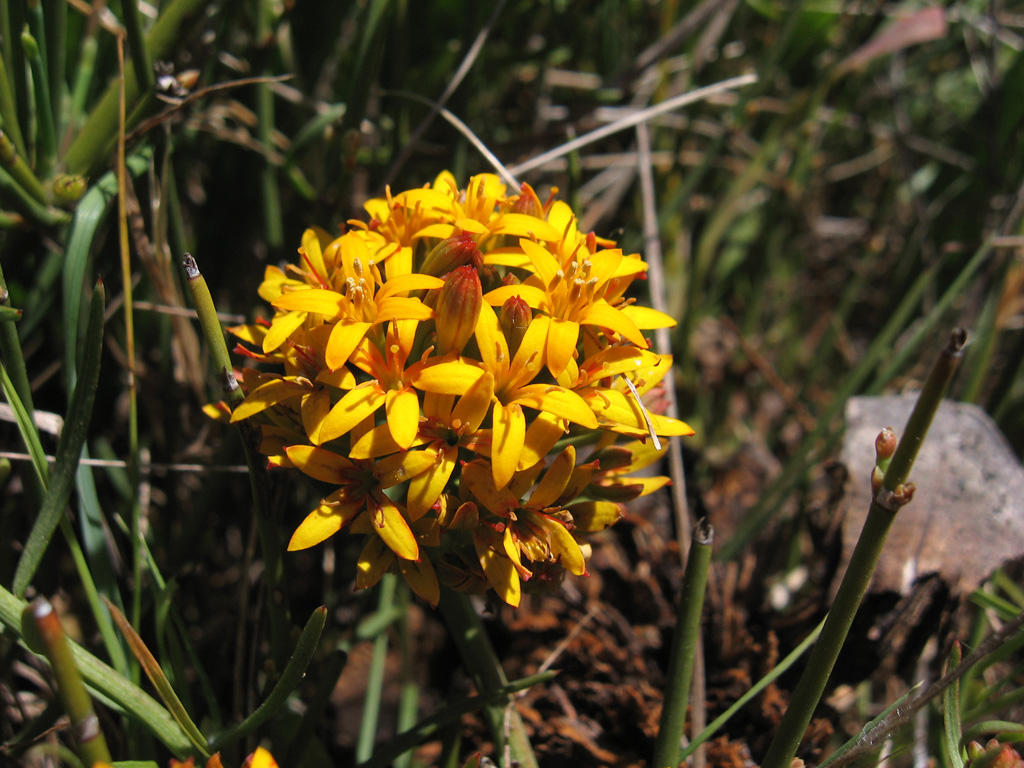

Scientific classification
- Kingdom: Plantae
- Clade: Embryophytes
- Clade: Tracheophytes
- Clade: Spermatophytes
- Clade: Angiosperms
- Clade: Eudicots
- Order: Santalales
- Family: Schoepfiaceae
- Genus: Quinchamalium; Molina
- Species: Q. chilense

Binomial name
- Quinchamalium chilense Molina

Synonyms
- Quinchamalium andinum; Quinchamalium bracteosum; Quinchamalium brevistaminatum; Quinchamalium carnosum; Quinchamalium elegans; Quinchamalium elongatum; Quinchamalium excrescens; Quinchamalium fruticulosum; Quinchamalium hoppii; Quinchamalium linarioides; Quinchamalium linifolium; Quinchamalium litorale; Quinchamalium lomae; Quinchamalium parviflorum; Quinchamalium peruvianum; Quinchamalium pratense; Quinchamalium purpureum; Quinchamalium stuebelii; Quinchamalium tarapacanum; Quinchamalium thesioides

= Quinchamalium =

Species of flowering plant

Quinchamalium is a genus of flowering plant in the family Schoepfiaceae, with a single species Quinchamalium chilense, native to Chile, Argentina, Peru and Bolivia. Depending on the latitude, it can be found from sea level to 3,800 m in elevation.

== Etymology ==
It is locally called quinchamalí. The word kincha translates from Quechua as 'hedge of sticks', as often made from dead old quinoa plants (see quincha).

== Description ==
Quinchamalium chilense is a herbaceous, hemiparasitic, perennial plant with a rhizome, from which smaller rootlets with haustoria grow. From the rhizome a number of rarely-branching stems grow each year. These can be decumbent (creeping over the ground) or rise to over 2 metres in height. The flowers are produced in a cluster at the end of the stems, they are pentamerous and usually orangey-yellow in colour. It is extremely variable in height and flower size and colour, so much so that at one time 21 species were recognised, but in 2015 these were all reduced to synonymy with Q. chilense. It is heterostylous; some individuals bear 'thrum flowers', flowers which have short styles. This is somewhat correlated with elevation and cold. The leaves are also variable among individuals, they can be narrow or broader, the plants with more narrow leaves correlated with higher temperatures. The size of the plant appears correlated with annual precipitation.

This species has rather bizarre embryos, which appear to be parasitic upon their mother plant before even being pollinated. As the embryo develops in the ovule, the two synergid cells elongate into tubes which penetrate through the micropyle and grow about a third up the length of the style where they form haustoria, organs for sucking nutrients from a host. It also creates a lateral caecum (pouch) close to the other end of the embryo, the chalazal end, which extends in the basal region of funiculus. This rare situation is also known to occur in pampas grasses of the genus Cortaderia and some species of the Olax genus.

As noted above, the individuals of this species can have 'thrum flowers' or 'pin flowers', which differ in form and length of the styles, and often have both. In most heterostylous plants, this is associated with self-incompatibility, but in Q. chilense both flower forms are bisexual and self-fertile. Nonetheless, the smaller pin flowers appear to create more pollen and have a higher seed set. Why these plants have different sized flowers is probably caused by some sort of pollinator relationship, but the gist of it is still unknown.

== Ecology ==
Quinchamalium chilense is a dominant plant species, along with Festuca scabriuscula, Poa obvalata and Adesmia emarginata in a type of Patagonian steppe habitat with scattered trees of Araucaria araucana found along the upper course of the Biobío River in the Araucanía Region of Chile. This is a cold region at 1,500 m altitude, with a dry season of one to two months, sometimes heavy rains, and temperatures which can fall below freezing.

The fly Mitrodetus dentitarsis is known to visit the flowers in Chile.

== Uses ==
In southern Chile the plant is used in folk medicine.
