= Xymenopsis subnodosus =

Scientific classification
- Kingdom: Animalia
- Phylum: Mollusca
- Class: Gastropoda
- Subclass: Caenogastropoda
- Order: Neogastropoda
- Family: Muricidae
- Subfamily: Pagodulinae
- Genus: Xymenopsis
- Species: X. subnodosus

Binomial name
- Xymenopsis subnodosus (Gray, 1839)

Synonyms
- Buccinum subnodosa Gray, 1839; Fusus cancellinus Philippi, 1845

Species of gastropod

Xymenopsis subnodosus is a species of sea snail, a marine gastropod mollusk in the family Muricidae, the murex snails or rock snails.

== Description ==
(Described as Fusus cancellinus) The white shell is fusiform. The whorls are convex. There are 16 ribs and 12 lirae (in the body whorl about24). The aperture is ovately oblong. The siphonal canal measures about the same length as the spire. The inner lip is thickened and toothed.

== Distribution ==
This marine species occurs in the Strait of Magellan.
