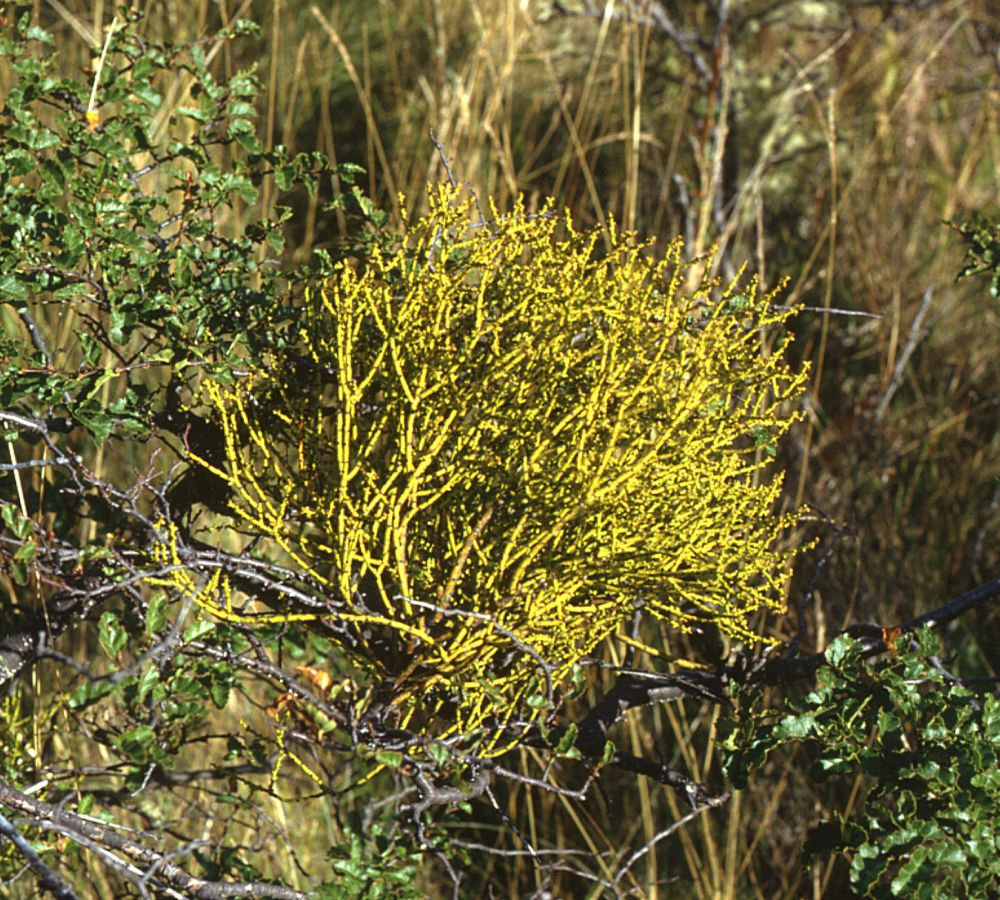
- Misodendrum punctulatum on Nothofagus antarctica

Scientific classification
- Kingdom: Plantae
- Clade: Tracheophytes
- Clade: Angiosperms
- Clade: Eudicots
- Order: Santalales
- Family: Misodendraceae
- Genus: Misodendrum
- Species: M. punctulatum

Binomial name
- Misodendrum punctulatum Banks ex DC.

= Misodendrum punctulatum =

Species of mistletoe

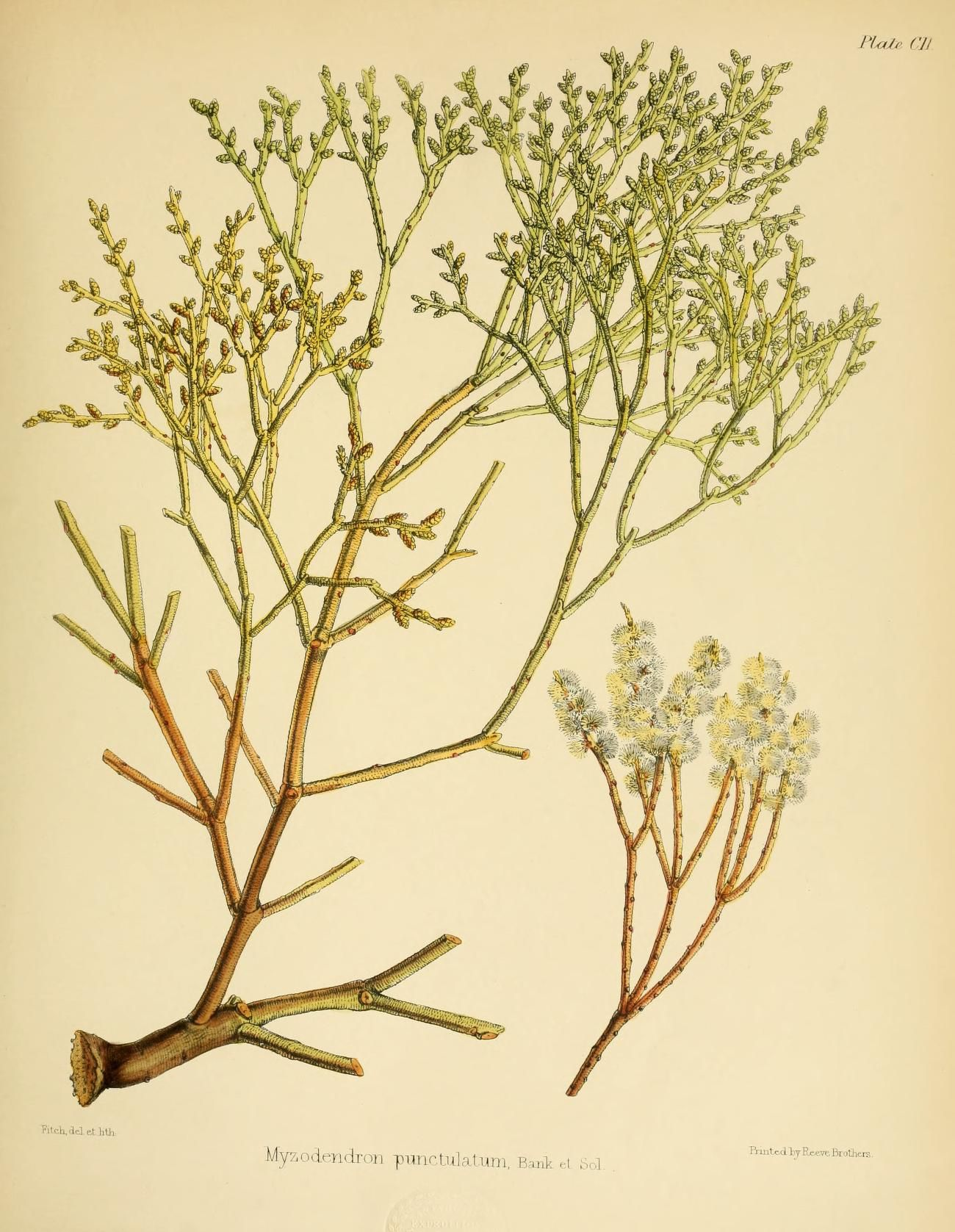
Misodendrum punctulatum

Misodendrum punctulatum is a species of parasitic plant which grows as a mistletoe on various species of Nothofagus, especially on deciduous species like N. antarctica and N. pumilio, but also on the evergreen N. dombeyi and N. betuloides. It is native to humid forests in the southern part of South America where it grows on trees on south-facing slopes and in shady locations.

== Description ==
Misodendrum punctulatum grows into a small, much-branched bush some 25 cm (10 in) high. Growth is sympodial, a growth pattern in which the apical meristem terminates and growth continues by lateral meristems. The leaves are scales with reduced photosynthetic activity. Small flowers are produced in spring in the axils of the leaves on second-year growth. These are followed by small achenes with hairy bristles. These are dispersed by wind and become entangled on tree branches by their bristles. Mistletoes in this genus, Misodendrum, are the only wind-dispersed hemiparasites.

== Distribution and habitat ==
Misodendrum punctulatum is native to the southern half of Chile and the foothills of the Patagonian Andes in southern Argentina, growing at altitudes of up to about 2,000 m (6,562 ft). At medium altitudes it occurs below the treeline and at low altitudes it is present in valleys. It prefers south-facing slopes both in shade and in deep shade. It requires humid conditions with abundant rainfall and dry periods that last no longer than a month.

== Ecology ==
Misodendrum punctulatum grows as a hemiparasite; it is partially photosynthetic but also obtains part of its nutritional needs from its host. It infects southern beech trees, including the deciduous N. pumilio and N. antarctica, and the evergreen N. dombeyi and N. betuloides. It disperses to new trees by means of its wind-borne seeds, the bristles on which adhere to small branches of suitable host trees. These branches are usually less than four years old, suggesting that the germinating seedling is unable to cope with penetrating thicker bark. There is an incubation period lasting several years during which the new mistletoe plant obtains its nourishment from the host tree. After that aerial shoots develop.
