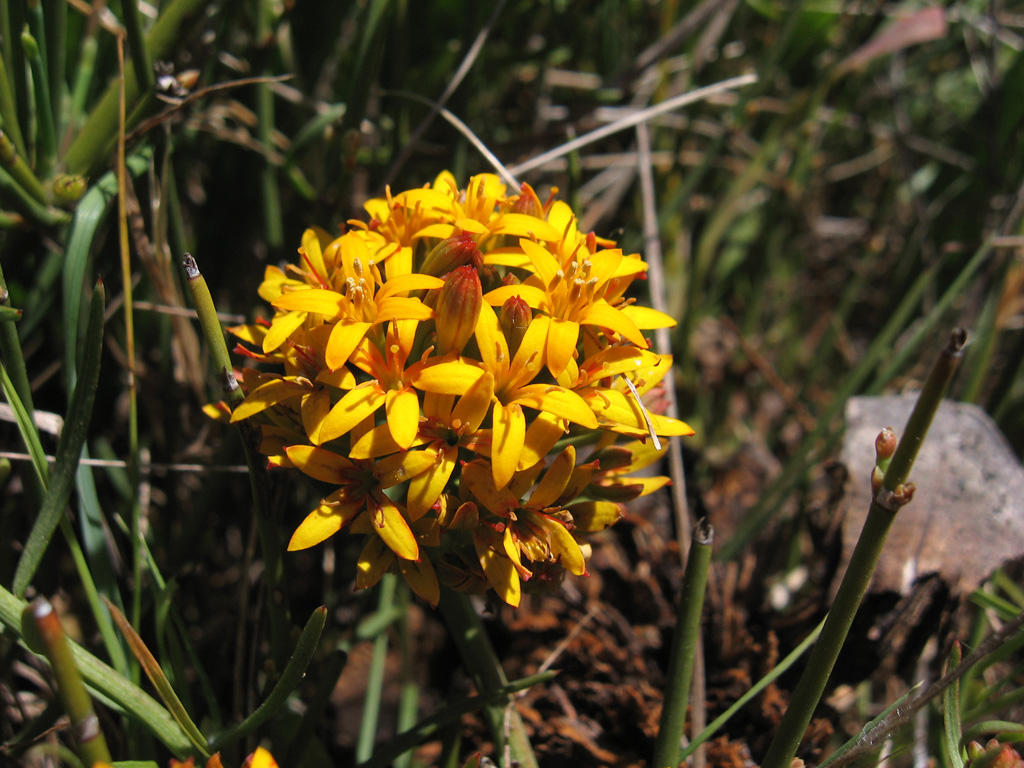
- Quinchamalium chilense

Scientific classification
- Kingdom: Plantae
- Clade: Tracheophytes
- Clade: Angiosperms
- Clade: Eudicots
- Order: Santalales
- Family: Schoepfiaceae; Blume

Genera
- Arjona Cavanilles; Quinchamalium Molina; Schoepfia Schreber

= Schoepfiaceae =

Family of flowering plants

Schoepfiaceae is a family of flowering plants recognized in the APG III system of 2009. The family was previously only recognized by few taxonomists; the plants in question were usually assigned to family Olacaceae and Santalaceae.

The genus Schoepfia is, according to molecular studies, more closely related to the families Misodendraceae and Loranthaceae, and to uphold the criteria of monophyly it must be excluded from Olacaceae. Further investigations have also shown that the South American genera Arjona and Quinchamalium (previously in the family Santalaceae) are part of this family. Thus the family contains three genera. Quinchamalium was thought to comprise 21 species in 2015, but this was reduced to a single widespread and morphologically variable species in that year. Christenhusz et al. claimed there was a total of 58 known species in 2016, but for some reason counted 25 species of Quinchamalium and eight of Arjona.

- Arjona Cavanilles (5 or 6 species) – western and southern South America
- Quinchamalium Molina (1 species) – Andes and temperate South America
- Schoepfia Schreber (25 species) – temperate and tropical East Asia, tropical America
