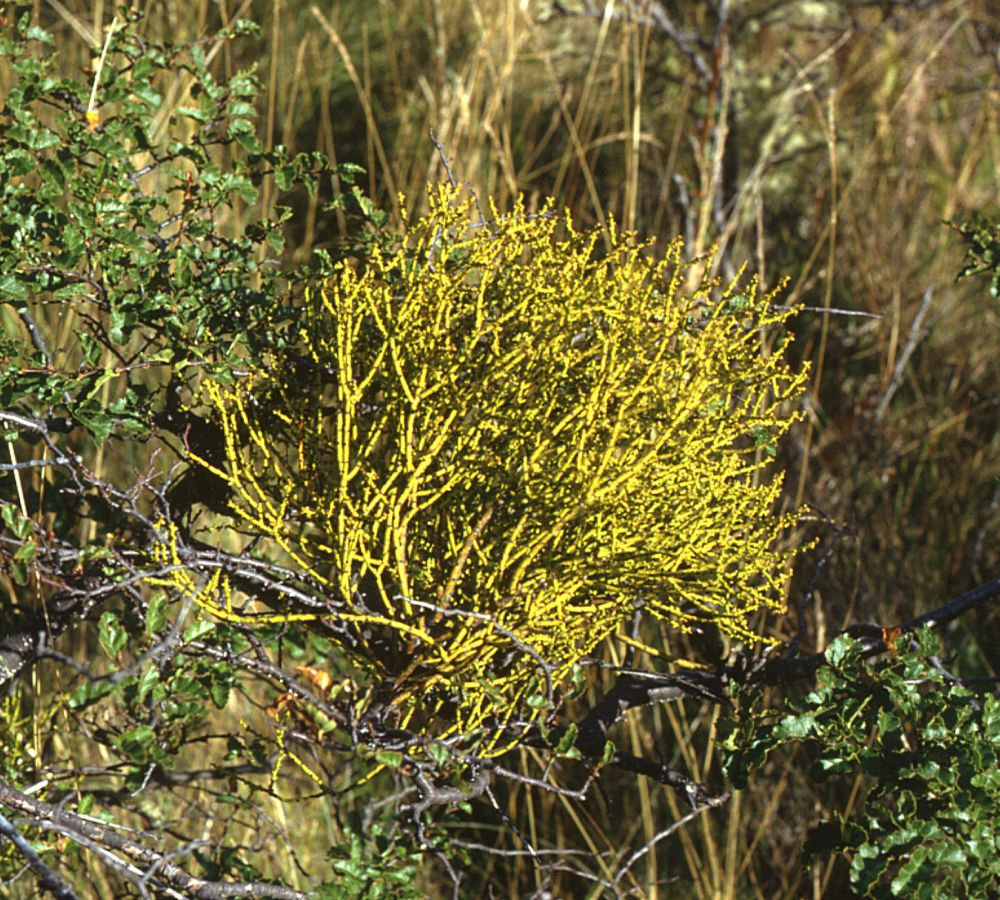
- Misodendrum punctulatum on Nothofagus antarctica

Scientific classification
- Kingdom: Plantae
- Clade: Embryophytes
- Clade: Tracheophytes
- Clade: Angiosperms
- Clade: Eudicots
- Order: Santalales
- Family: Misodendraceae; J.Agardh
- Genus: Misodendrum; Banks ex DC.

Species
- See text

Synonyms
- Misodendron G.Don, orth. var.; Myzodendron R.Br., orth. var.

= Misodendrum =

Genus of mistletoes

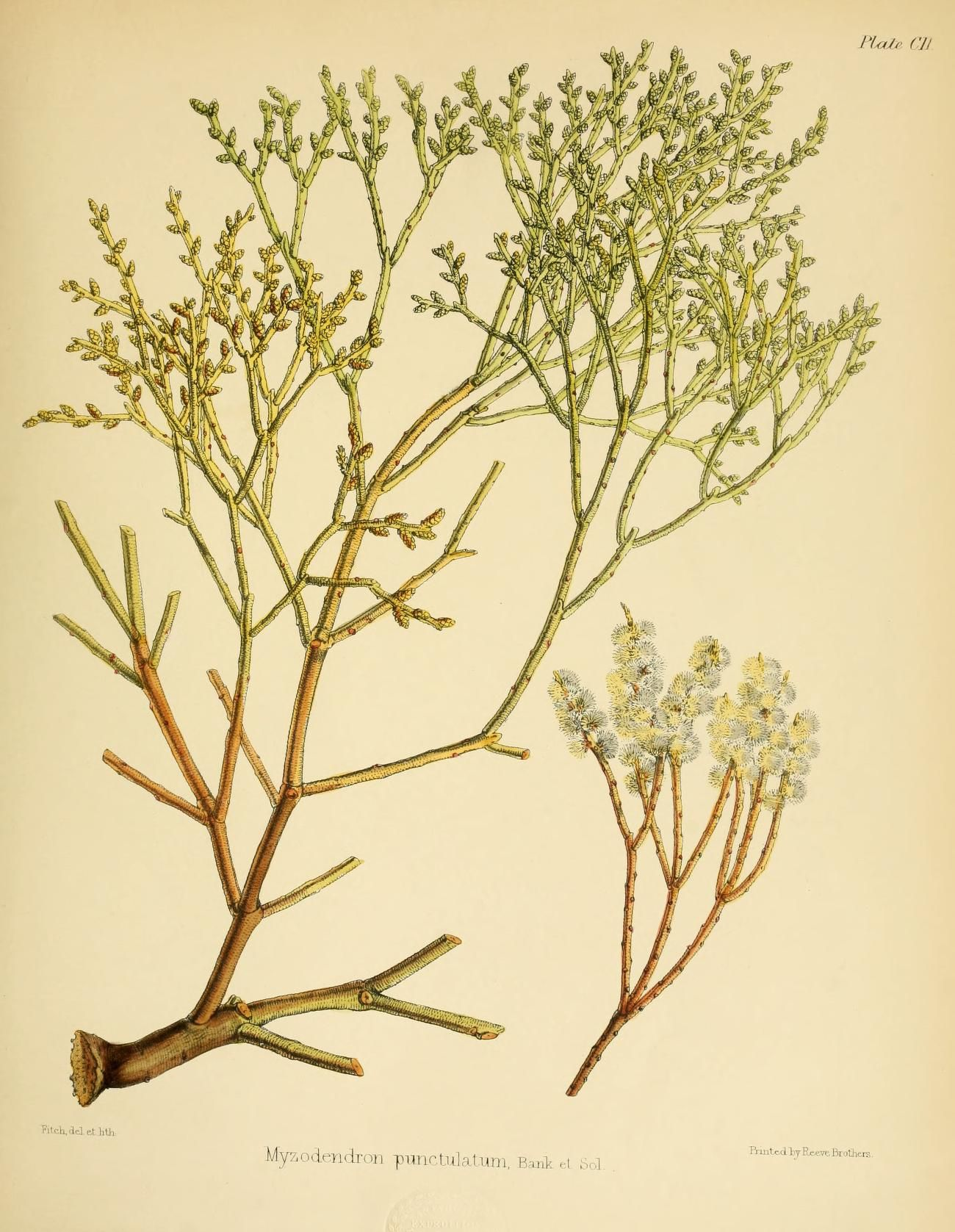
Misodendrum punctulatum

Misodendrum (feathery mistletoe) is a genus of hemiparasites which grow as mistletoes on various species of Nothofagus. Its species are native to South America. The name of the genus is incorrectly spelt in a number of ways, including Misodendron and Myzodendron.

Misodendrum is placed in its own family, Misodendraceae, in the order Santalales.

== Species ==
As of May 2015, The Plant List accepts the following species:

- Misodendrum angulatum Phil.
- Misodendrum brachystachyum DC.
- Misodendrum gayanum Tiegh.
- Misodendrum linearifolium DC.
- Misodendrum macrolepis Phil.
- Misodendrum oblongifolium DC.
- Misodendrum punctulatum Banks ex DC.
- Misodendrum quadriflorum DC.

== See also ==
- Parasitic plant
