= Friedrich Sellow =

German botanist and naturalist

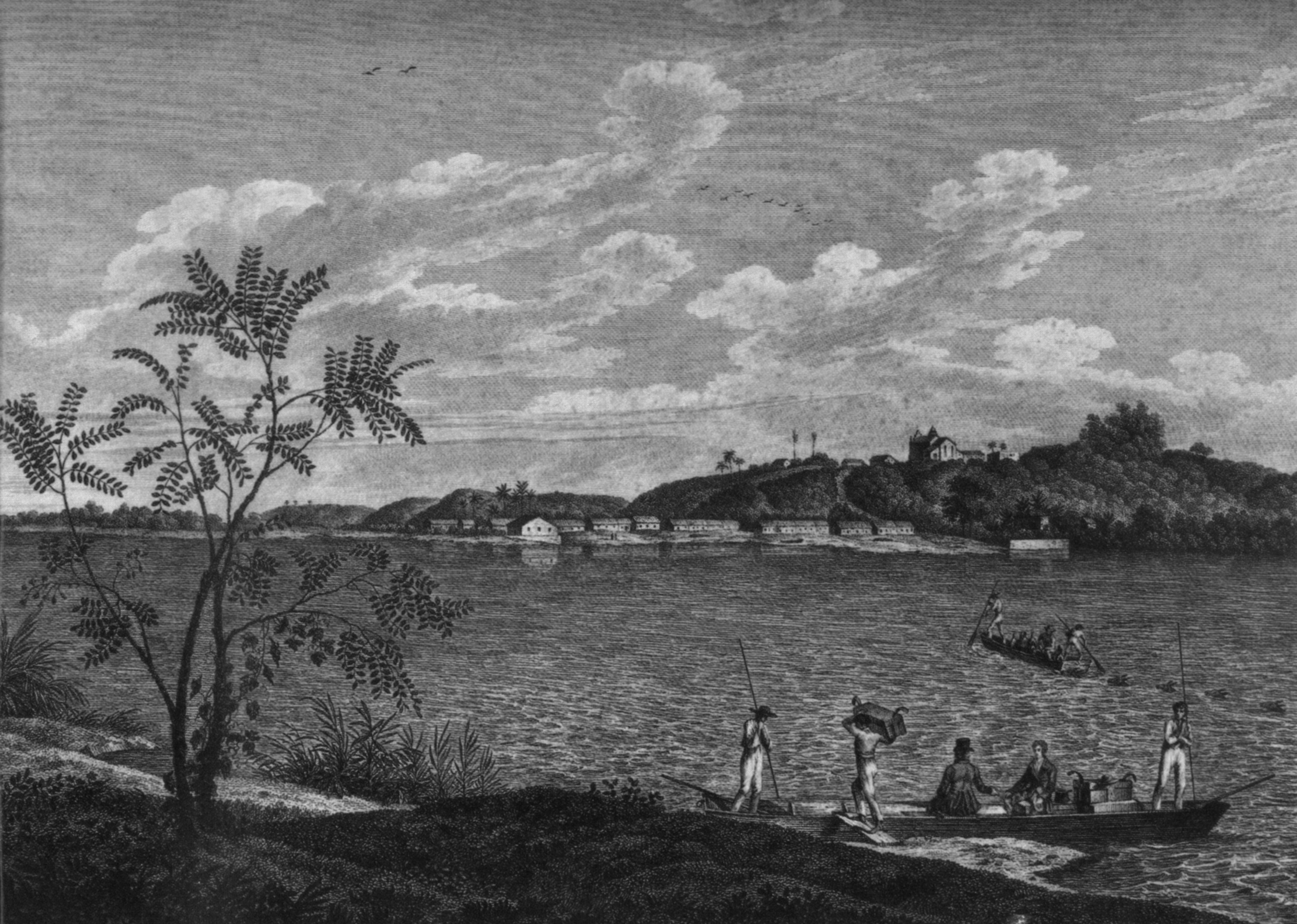
Bahia's paisage, by Sellow.

Friedrich Sellow (var. Sello) (1789–1831) was a German botanist and naturalist. He was one of the earliest European scientific explorers of Brazil and Uruguay, and a major collector of Brazilian flora.

Friedrich Sellow was born on March 12, 1789. He was the eldest son of Carl Julius Samuel Sello, the gardener of the Royal Court of Potsdam. After learning the gardening profession with relatives, Sellow went to work and study in the Botanical Garden of Berlin under the patronage of its director, Carl Ludwig Willdenow (1765–1812). In 1810 Sellow travelled to Paris to study. Here he attended scientific lectures by Georges Cuvier and Jean-Baptiste Lamarck, and worked at the Jardin des Plantes.

In the next year, with recommendations and financial assistance from Alexander von Humboldt (1769–1859), Sellow traveled to the Netherlands and England, coming in contact with the most prominent botanists of the time. During the Napoleonic Wars Sellow avoided France and the rest of continental Europe, accepting an invitation by the Russian consul Baron von Langsdorff (1774–1852), to be part of a scientific expedition the baron was organizing in Brazil. (Langsdorff was serving at the time as a diplomat in Rio de Janeiro.) In 1814, with the financial backing of British botanists, and after having made meticulous preparations, Sellow sailed to Rio de Janeiro. There, he and his colleagues were well received by the Portuguese colonial government, and Sellow soon began receiving a generous annual salary as an official naturalist. Sellow learned to speak Portuguese, and carried out initially smaller excursions in the environs of Rio de Janeiro; including, from 1815 to 1817, an expedition led by the German prince Maximilian zu Wied-Neuwied (1782–1867). From these expeditions Sellow collected many specimens which he sent back to London. One of these was Salvia splendens, known as Lee's scarlet sage, which became popular as an ornamental summer flower in England and Germany.

Further financing from Prussia allowed Sellow to undertake numerous other expeditions in southern Brazil and Uruguay during the next 11 years; he traveled into the unexplored regions of the country, and collected thousands of plants, seeds, wood samples, insects and minerals. In the tradition of independent 19th century naturalists, he sent these collections to botanical gardens in Brazil, Portugal, England and Germany. Among the seed specimens of South American ornamental plants sent by Sellow were Begonia cucullata (pearl begonia), and the white-petaled Petunia axillaris (wild white petunia) which were soon popular in Europe, particularly across Germany, Switzerland and Austria, and were planted on balconies of homes.

In one of his ethnographic expeditions, Sellow accompanied the diplomat Ignaz Maria von Olfers (1793–1872), who later became the first general manager of the Royal Prussian museums. Some of Sellow's scientific collections from Uruguay and Brazil are divided between the Museum of Natural History of Berlin, the Ethnological Museum of Berlin, and the Museum of Natural History of Vienna. These collections include, in addition to botany, many zoological preparations, insects, shells, ethnographic drawings and original diaries.

In October 1831, Sellow died by drowning in a river at 42 years old. His versatile and rich contribution to the botanical knowledge of Brazilian flora remained largely forgotten until recently, when his name was honored with Sellowia, a botanical journal published in Itajaí, Brazil.

== Botanical legacy ==
Botanical specimens collected by Sellow are cared for in institutions worldwide. These include the Kew Herbarium, the Berlin Botanical Garden and Botanical Museum, Plantentuin Meise and the National Herbarium of Victoria, Royal Botanic Gardens Victoria.
