= Jacques Bernard Hombron =

French naval surgeon and naturalist

- Born: 15 April 1798; Paris
- Died: 16 October 1852 (aged 54); At sea
- Known for: Description of plants and animals; Aventures les plus curieuses des voyageurs : coup d'oeil autour du monde
- Scientific career
- Fields: Botany, ornithology
- Workplaces: Astrolabe (French ship)
- Author abbrev. (botany): Hombr.

Jacques Bernard Hombron (1798–1852) was a French naval surgeon and naturalist.

Hombron served on the French voyage of the Astrolabe and Zélée between 1837 and 1840 to investigate the perimeter of Antarctica. He described a number of plants and animals with Honoré Jacquinot. Hombron served as surgeon and botanist on the Astrolabe and Honoré Jacquinot was a junior surgeon on the Zélée. A botanical account of the expedition was published in: "Voyage au Pôle Sud et dans l'Océanie sur les corvettes l'Astrolabe et la Zélée ... Botanique / par MM. Hombron et Jacquinot"; (2 volumes 1845–1853).

In 1847 Hombron published a two-volume work on his personal and other explorers' adventures, titled: "Aventures les plus curieuses des voyageurs : coup d'oeil autour du monde". In 1841 Charles Gaudichaud-Beaupré named the plant genus Hombronia in his honor.

== See also ==
- European and American voyages of scientific exploration
