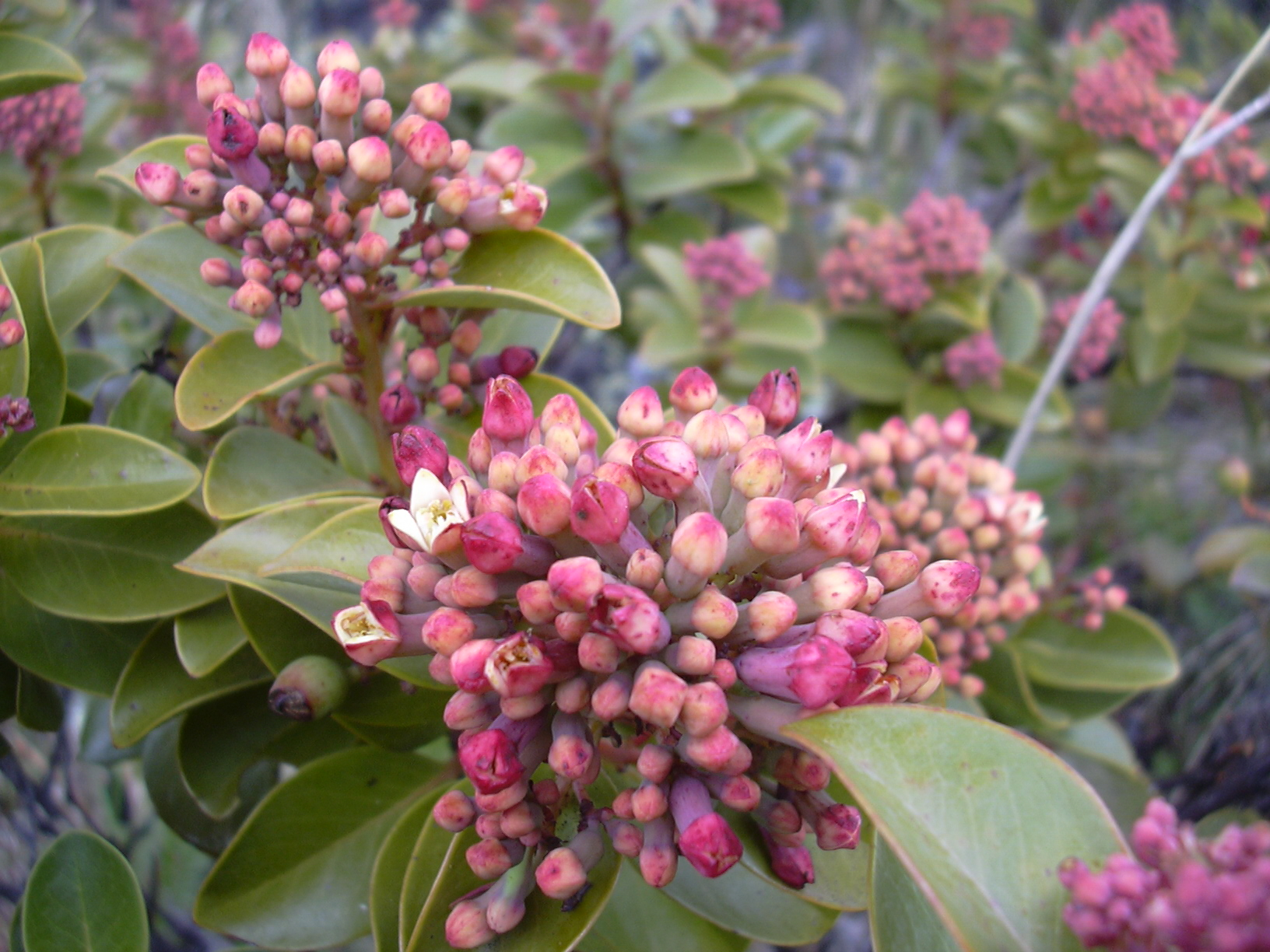
- Santalum haleakalae

Scientific classification
- Kingdom: Plantae
- Clade: Tracheophytes
- Clade: Angiosperms
- Clade: Eudicots
- Clade: Superasterids
- Order: Santalales; R.Br. ex Bercht. & J.Presl

Families
- See text

Synonyms
- Balanophorales

= Santalales =

Order of flowering plants

The Santalales are an order of flowering plants of eudicots. Well-known members of the Santalales include sandalwoods and the many species of mistletoes. The order has a cosmopolitan distribution, but is heavily concentrated in tropical and subtropical regions. It derives its name from its type genus, Santalum (sandalwood).

== Overview ==
Many of the members of the order are parasitic plants, mostly hemiparasites, able to produce sugars through photosynthesis, but tapping the stems or roots of other plants to obtain water and minerals; some (e.g. Arceuthobium) are obligate parasites, have low concentrations of chlorophyll within their shoots (1/5 to 1/10 of that found in their host's foliage), and derive the majority of their sustenance from their hosts' vascular tissues (water, micro- and macronutrients, and sucrose).

Most have seeds without testae (seed coats), which is unusual for flowering plants.

== Classification ==
The APG IV system of 2016 includes seven families. As in the earlier APG III system, it was accepted that Olacaceae sensu lato was paraphyletic but new family limits were not proposed as relationships were considered uncertain. As of July 2021, this seven-family division of the Santalales was explicitly accepted by the World Flora Online, and implicitly by Plants of the World Online, in that it accepted none of the extra families recognized by other sources. The seven families are:

- Balanophoraceae
- Loranthaceae
- Misodendraceae
- Olacaceae
- Opiliaceae
- Santalaceae
- Schoepfiaceae

When only these families are recognized, one possible phylogenetic relationship among them is shown below. Support for some of the nodes is weak, and at least two families, Olacaceae s.l. and Balanophoraceae s.l., are not monophyletic:

- Santalales
  - Olacaceae s.l.
  - - Balanophoraceae s.l.
    - - - Loranthaceae
        - - Misodendraceae
          - Schoepfiaceae
      - - Opiliaceae
        - Santalaceae s.l.

A summary of the circumscription and phylogeny of the Santalales published in 2020 used 20 rather than seven families. Olacaceae s.l. was divided into seven families, Balanophoraceae s.l. was divided into two, and Santalaceae s.l. into seven. As of July 2021, the Angiosperm Phylogeny Website accepted the families resulting from the division of Olacaceae s.l. and Balanophoraceae s.l. but not those from the division of Santalaceae s.l.

Division of the sensu lato Santalales families according to Nickrent (2020)
Olacaceae s.l.; Aptandraceae; Coulaceae; Erythropalaceae; Octoknemaceae; Olacaceae s.s.; Strombosiaceae; Ximeniaceae	Balanophoraceae s.l.; Balanophoraceae s.s.; Mystropetalaceae	Santalaceae s.l.; Amphorogynaceae; Cervantesiaceae; Comandraceae; Nanodeaceae; Santalaceae s.s.; Thesiaceae; Viscaceae

=== Earlier systems ===
In the classification system of Dahlgren, the Santalales were in the superorder Santaliflorae (also called Santalanae). The Cronquist system (1981) used this circumscription:

- order Santalales

- family Medusandraceae – sole genus Medusandra now in family Peridiscaceae, order Saxifragales
- family Dipentodontaceae – now in order Huerteales in APG IV
- family Olacaceae
- family Opiliaceae
- family Santalaceae
- family Misodendraceae
- family Loranthaceae
- family Viscaceae - sunk into Santalaceae s.l. in the seven-family system
- family Eremolepidaceae - sunk into Santalaceae s.l. in the seven-family system
- family Balanophoraceae

== Gallery of type genera ==
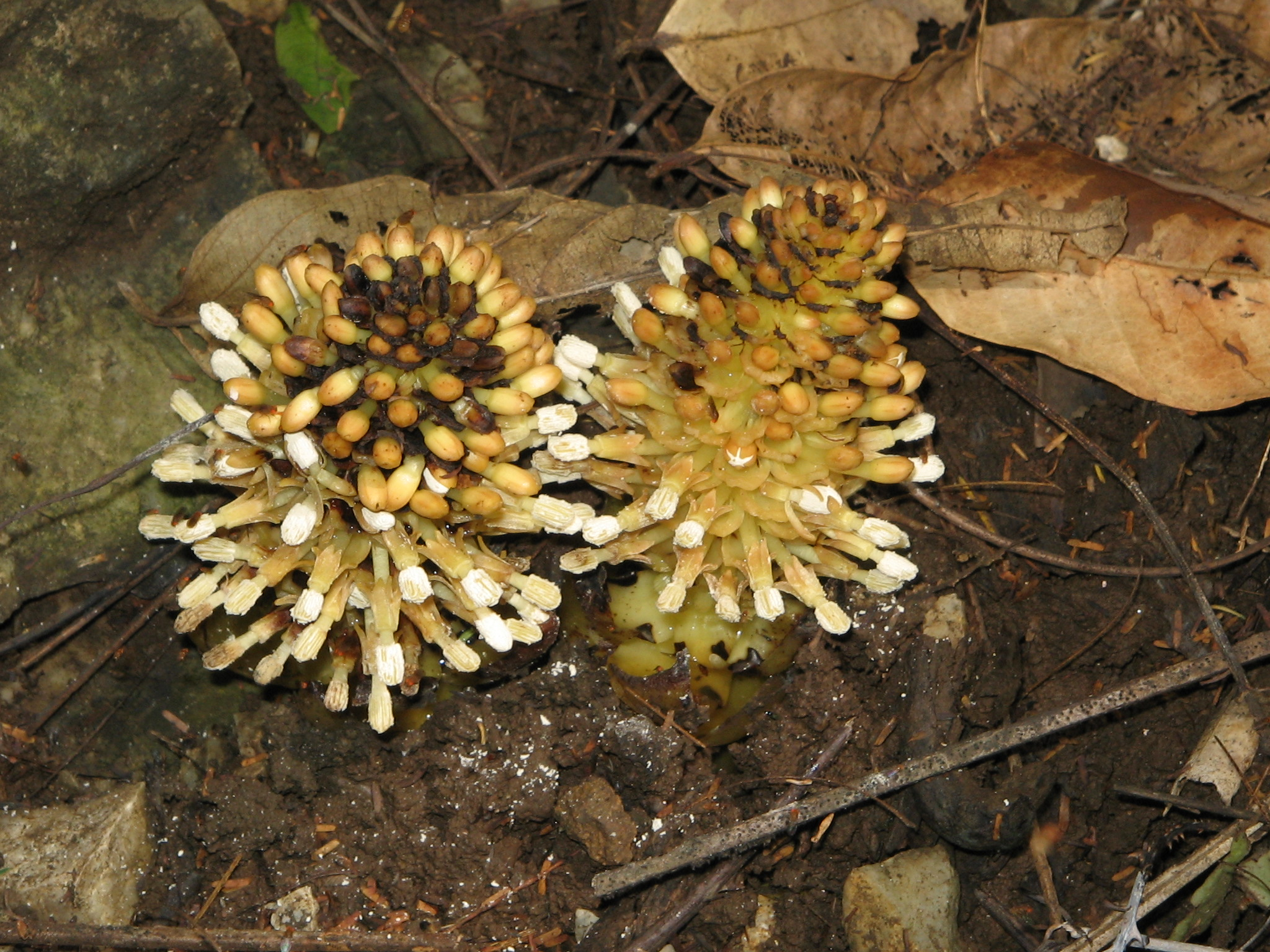
Balanophora fungosa

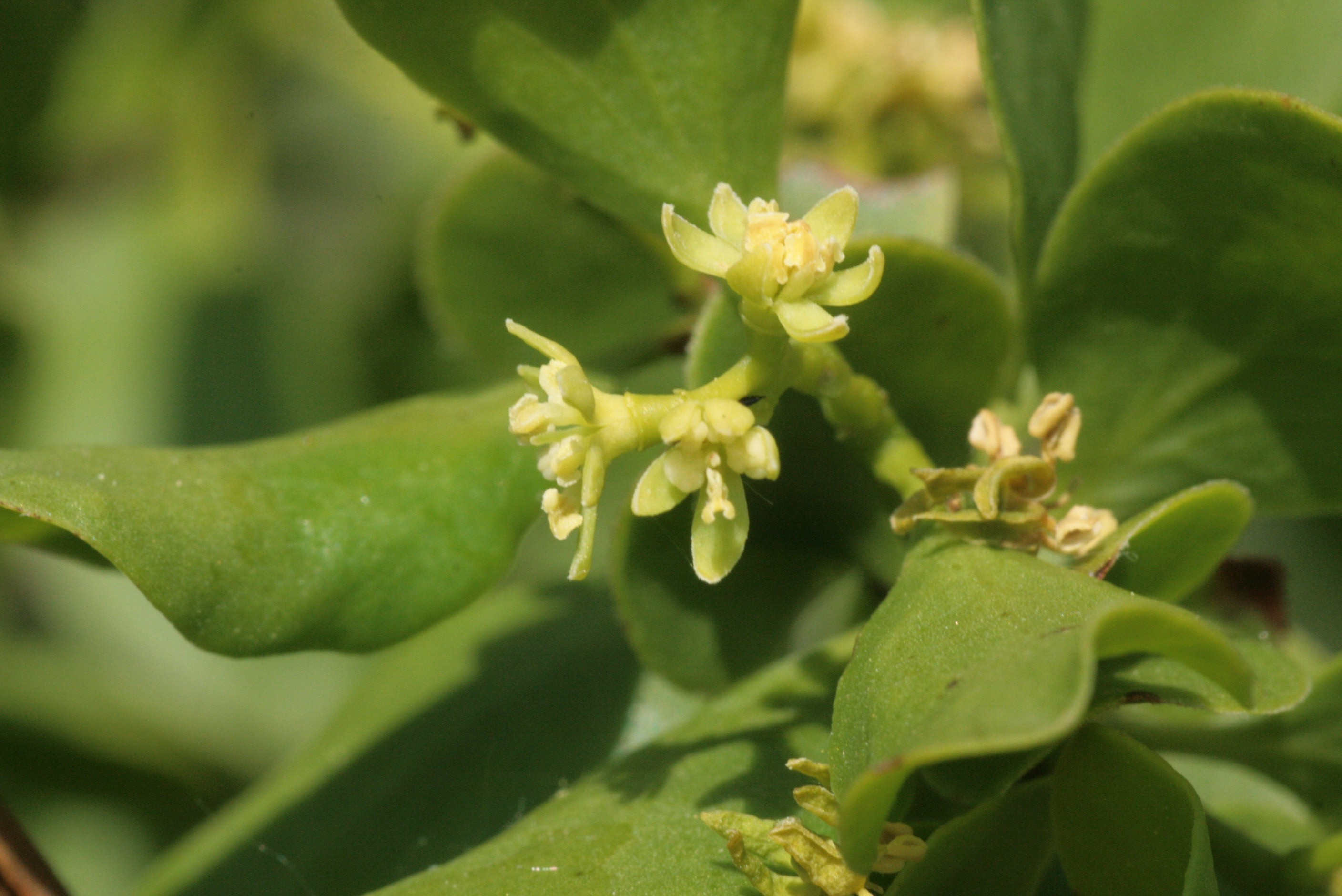
Loranthus europaeus

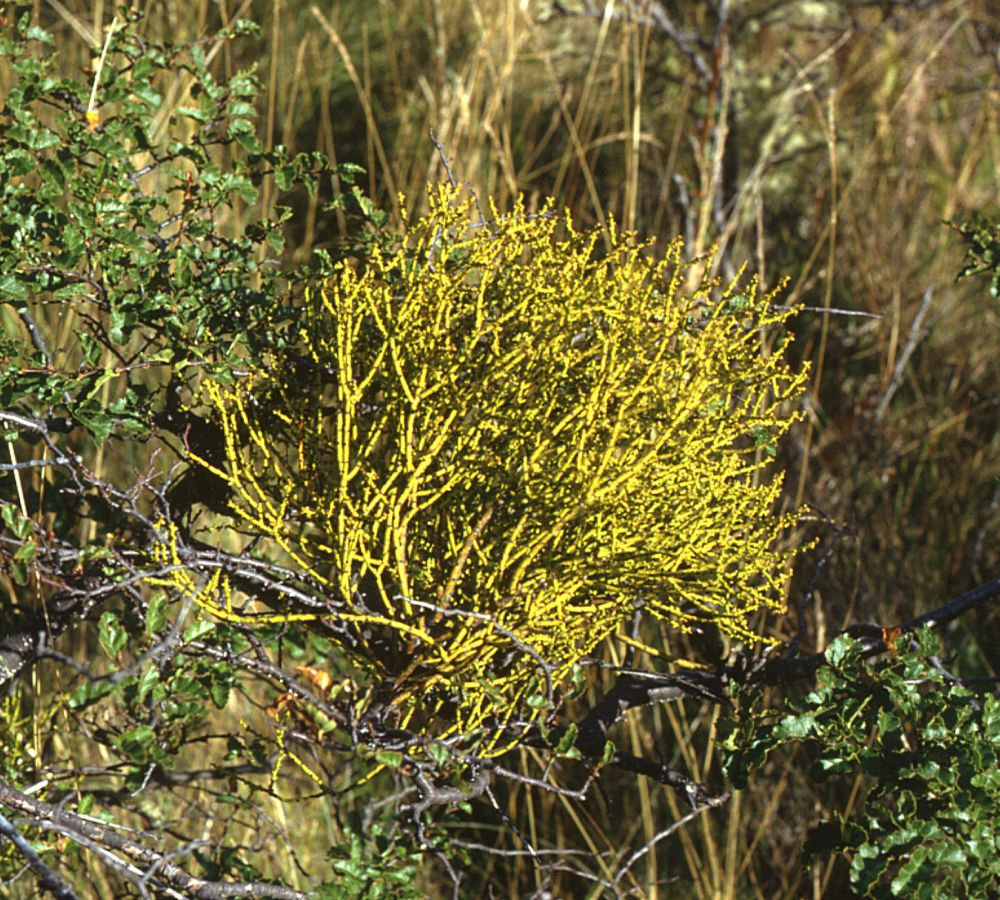
Misodendrum punctulatum

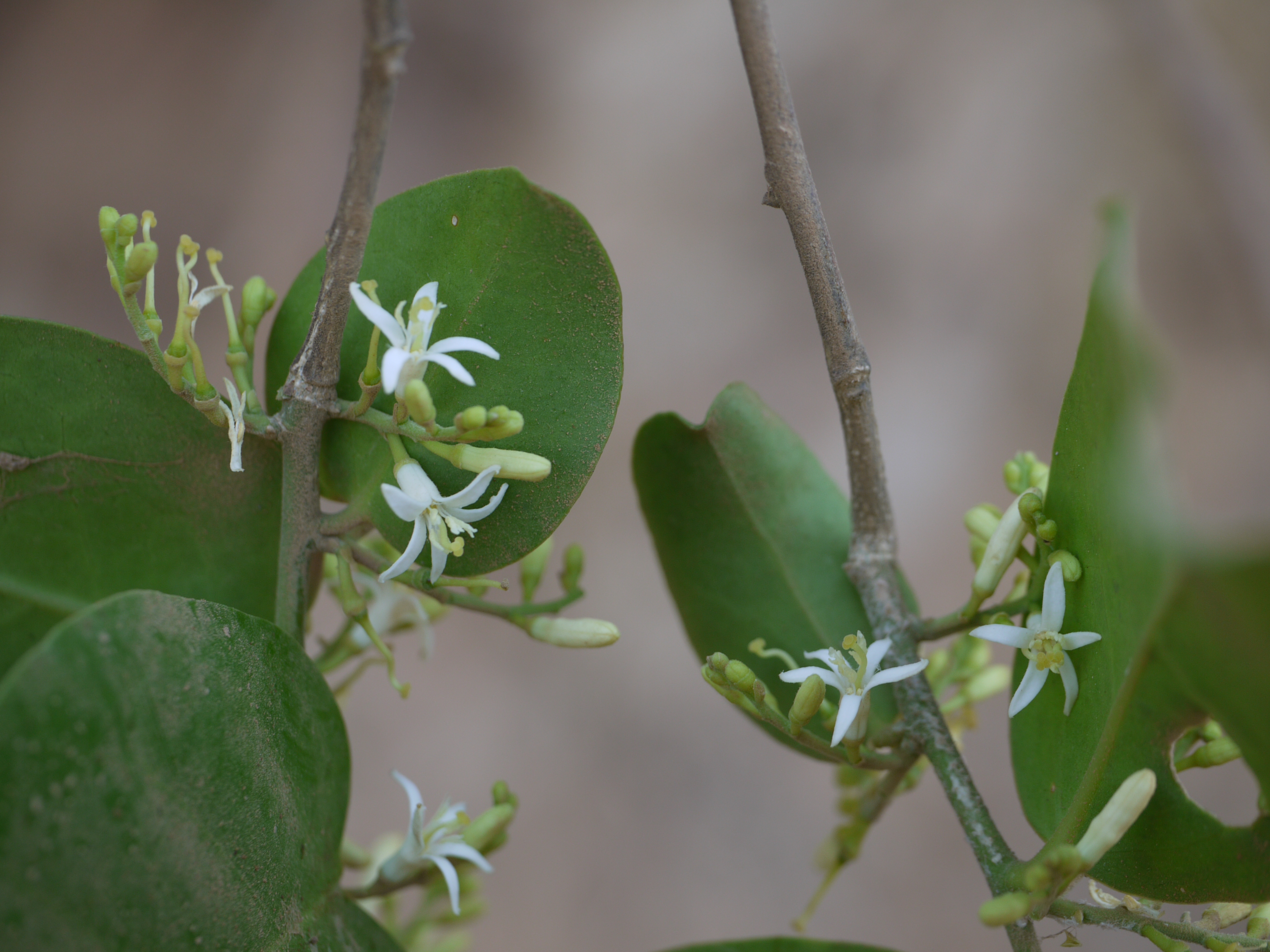
Olax imbricata

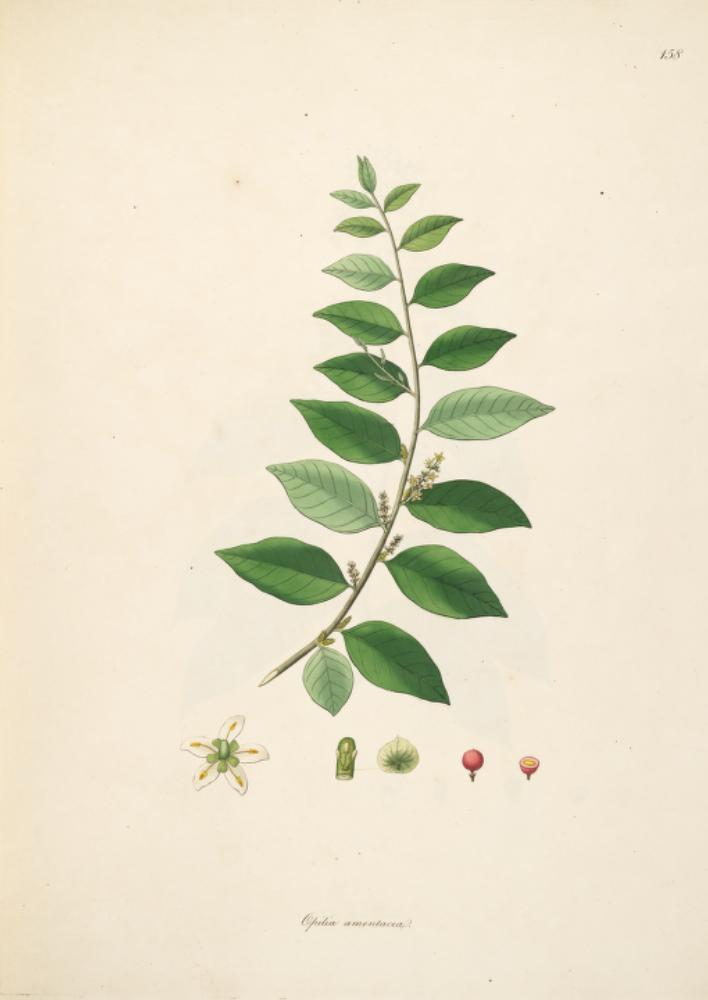
Opilia amentacea

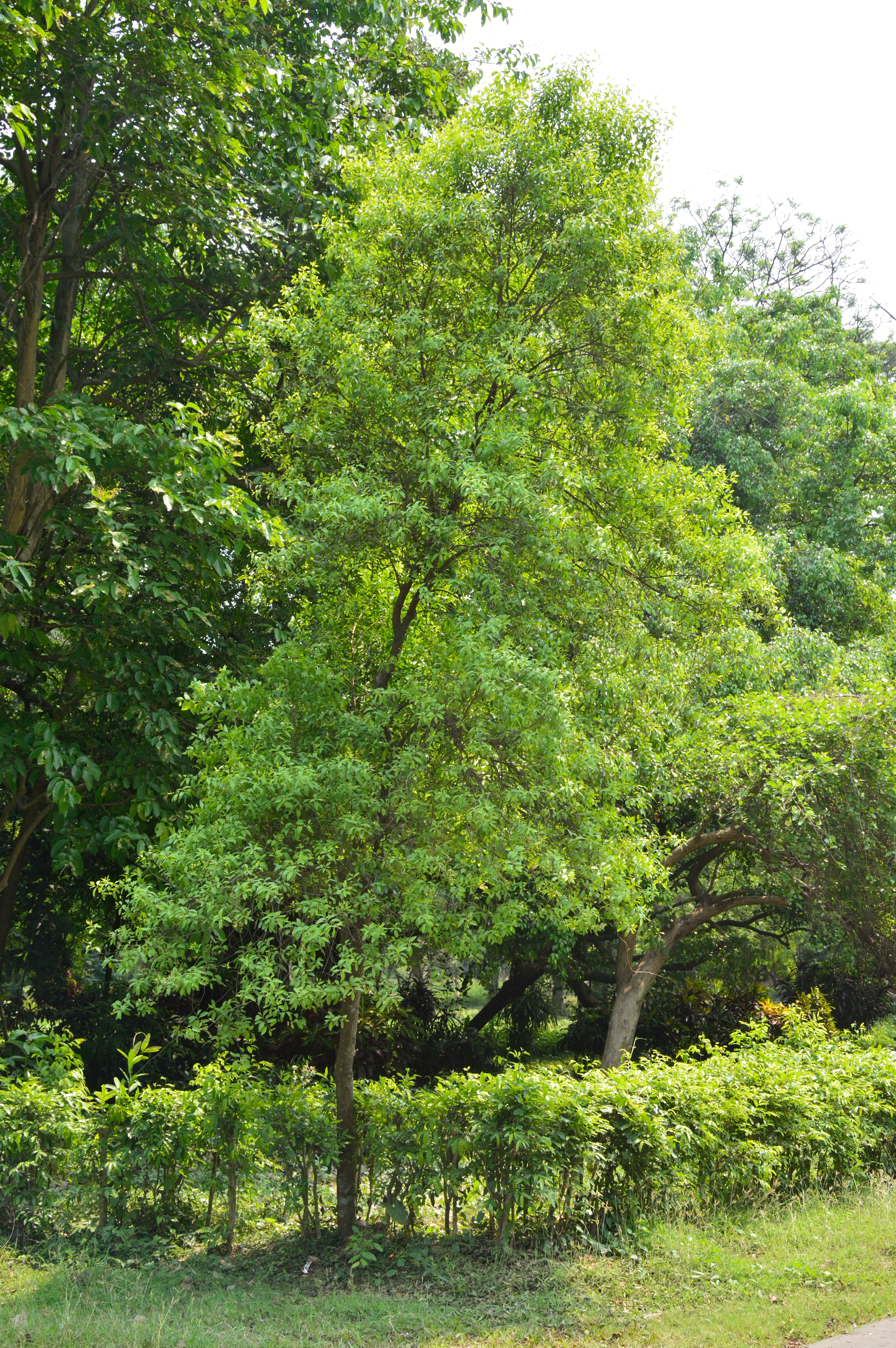
Santalum album

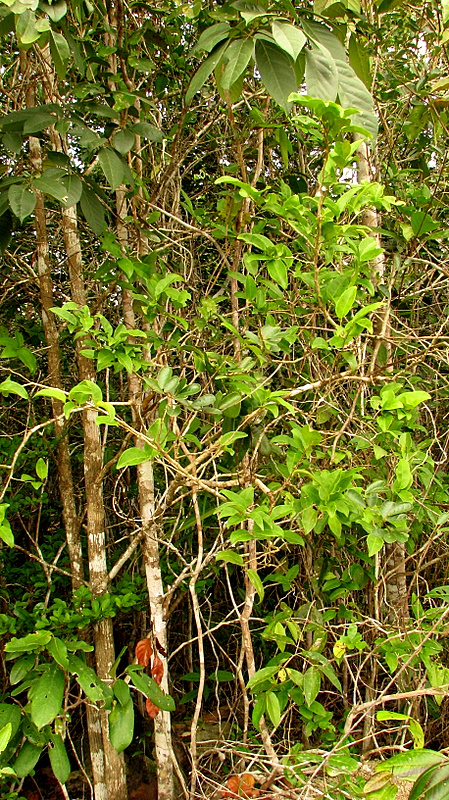
Schoepfia brasiliensis
