= List of Caryophyllales of South Africa =

Flowering plants in the order Caryophyllales recorded from South Africa

Caryophyllales (/ˌkærioʊfɪˈleɪliːz/ KARR-ee-oh-fil-AY-leez) is an order of flowering plants that includes the cacti, carnations, amaranths, ice plants, beets, and many carnivorous plants. Many members are succulent, having fleshy stems or leaves. This order is part of the core eudicots. The monophyly of the Caryophyllales has been supported by DNA sequences, cytochrome c sequence data and heritable characters such as anther wall development and vessel-elements with simple perforations.

The anthophytes are a grouping of plant taxa bearing flower-like reproductive structures. They were formerly thought to be a clade comprising plants bearing flower-like structures. The group contained the angiosperms - the extant flowering plants, such as roses and grasses - as well as the Gnetales and the extinct Bennettitales.

23,420 species of vascular plant have been recorded in South Africa, making it the sixth most species-rich country in the world and the most species-rich country on the African continent. Of these, 153 species are considered to be threatened. Nine biomes have been described in South Africa: Fynbos, Succulent Karoo, desert, Nama Karoo, grassland, savanna, Albany thickets, the Indian Ocean coastal belt, and forests.

The 2018 South African National Biodiversity Institute's National Biodiversity Assessment plant checklist lists 35,130 taxa in the phyla Anthocerotophyta (hornworts (6)), Anthophyta (flowering plants (33534)), Bryophyta (mosses (685)), Cycadophyta (cycads (42)), Lycopodiophyta (Lycophytes(45)), Marchantiophyta (liverworts (376)), Pinophyta (conifers (33)), and Pteridophyta (cryptogams (408)).

21 families are represented in the literature. Listed taxa include species, subspecies, varieties, and forms as recorded, some of which have subsequently been allocated to other taxa as synonyms, in which cases the accepted taxon is appended to the listing. Multiple entries under alternative names reflect taxonomic revision over time.

== Aizoaceae ==
Family Aizoaceae, 169 genera have been recorded. Not all are necessarily currently accepted.

- Genus Acrodon:
- Genus Acrosanthes:
- Genus Aethephyllum:
- Genus Aizoanthemum:
- Genus Aizoon:
- Genus Aloinopsis:
- Genus Amoebophyllum:
- Genus Amphibolia:
- Genus Antegibbaeum:
- Genus Antimima:
- Genus Anysocalyx:
- Genus Apatesia:
- Genus Aptenia: (synonym of Mesembryanthemum)
- Genus Arenifera:
- Genus Argeta:
- Genus Argyroderma:
- Genus Aridaria:
- Genus Aspazoma:
- Genus Astridia:
- Genus Bergeranthus:
- Genus Bijlia:
- Genus Braunsia:
- Genus Brianhuntleya:
- Genus Brownanthus: (synonym of Mesembryanthemum)
- Genus Calamophyllum:
- Genus Callistigma:
- Genus Carpanthea:
- Genus Carpobrotus:
- Genus Carruanthus:
- Genus Caryotophora:
- Genus Caulipsolon:
- Genus Cephalophyllum:
- Genus Cerochlamys:
- Genus Chasmatophyllum:
- Genus Cheiridopsis:
- Genus Circandra:
- Genus Cleretum:
- Genus Conicosia:
- Genus Conophyllum:
- Genus Conophytum:
- Genus Corpuscularia:
- Genus Cryophytum:
- Genus Cylindrophyllum:
- Genus Dactylopsis:
- Genus Deilanthe:
- Genus Delosperma:
- Genus Dicrocaulon:
- Genus Didymaotus:
- Genus Dinteranthus:
- Genus Diplosoma:
- Genus Disphyma:
- Genus Dorotheanthus:
- Genus Dracophilus:
- Genus Drosanthemopsis:
- Genus Drosanthemum:
- Genus Eberlanzia:
- Genus Ebracteola:
- Genus Ectotropis:
- Genus Enarganthe:
- Genus Erepsia:
- Genus Esterhuysenia:
- Genus Eurystigma:
- Genus Faucaria:
- Genus Frithia:
- Genus Galenia:
- Genus Gasoul:
- Genus Gibbaeum:
- Genus Glottiphyllum:
- Genus Halenbergia:
- Genus Hammeria:
- Genus Hartmanthus:
- Genus Hereroa:
- Genus Herrea:
- Genus Herreanthus:
- Genus Hydrodea:
- Genus Hymenogyne:
- Genus Ihlenfeldtia:
- Genus Imitaria:
- Genus Jacobsenia:
- Genus Jensenobotrya:
- Genus Jordaaniella:
- Genus Juttadinteria:
- Genus Kensitia:
- Genus Khadia:
- Genus Lampranthus:
- Genus Lapidaria:
- Genus Leipoldtia:
- Genus Lithops:
- Genus Litocarpus:
- Genus Machairophyllum:
- Genus Malephora:
- Genus Marlothistella:
- Genus Maughaniella:
- Genus Mentocalyx:
- Genus Mesembryanthemum:
- Genus Mestoklema:
- Genus Meyerophytum:
- Genus Micropterum:
- Genus Mitrophyllum:
- Genus Monilaria:
- Genus Mossia:
- Genus Muiria:
- Genus Namaquanthus:
- Genus Nananthus:
- Genus Nelia:
- Genus Neohenricia:
- Genus Nycteranthus:
- Genus Octopoma:
- Genus Odontophorus:
- Genus Oophytum:
- Genus Ophthalmophyllum:
- Genus Opophytum:
- Genus Orthopterum:
- Genus Oscularia:
- Genus Ottosonderia:
- Genus Peersia:
- Genus Pentacoilanthus:
- Genus Perapentacoilanthus:
- Genus Peratetracoilanthus:
- Genus Phiambolia:
- Genus Phyllobolus:
- Genus Platythyra:
- Genus Pleiospilos:
- Genus Plinthus:
- Genus Polymita:
- Genus Prenia:
- Genus Prepodesma:
- Genus Psammophora:
- Genus Pseudobrownanthus:
- Genus Psilocaulon:
- Genus Pteropentacoilanthus:
- Genus Rabiea:
- Genus Rhinephyllum:
- Genus Rhombophyllum:
- Genus Roosia:
- Genus Ruschia:
- Genus Ruschianthemum:
- Genus Ruschiella:
- Genus Saphesia:
- Genus Schlechteranthus:
- Genus Schwantesia:
- Genus Scopelogena :
- Genus Semnanthe:
- Genus Sesuvium:
- Genus Sineoperculum:
- Genus Skiatophytum:
- Genus Smicrostigma:
- Genus Sphalmanthus:
- Genus Stayneria:
- Genus Stoeberia:
- Genus Stomatium:
- Genus Synaptophyllum:
- Genus Tanquana:
- Genus Tetracoilanthus:
- Genus Tetragonia:
- Genus Titanopsis:
- Genus Trianthema:
- Genus Tribulocarpus:
- Genus Trichocyclus:
- Genus Trichodiadema:
- Genus Vanheerdea:
- Genus Vanzijlia:
- Genus Vlokia:
- Genus Volkeranthus:
- Genus Wooleya:
- Genus Zaleya:
- Genus Zeuktophyllum:

== Amaranthaceae ==
Family: Amaranthaceae,

=== Achyranthes ===
Genus Achyranthes:

- Achyranthes aspera L. not indigenous
  - Achyranthes aspera L. var. aspera, not indigenous
  - Achyranthes aspera L. var. pubescens (Moq.) C.C.Towns. not indigenous
  - Achyranthes aspera L. var. sicula L. not indigenous

=== Achyropsis ===
Genus Achyropsis:

- Achyropsis avicularis (E.Mey. ex Moq.) T.Cooke & C.H.Wright, endemic
- Achyropsis leptostachya (E.Mey. ex Meisn.) Baker & C.B.Clarke, indigenous

=== Aerva ===
Genus Aerva:

- Aerva lanata (L.) Juss. ex Schult. indigenous
- Aerva leucura Moq. indigenous

=== Alternanthera ===
Genus Alternanthera:

- Alternanthera caracasana Kunth, not indigenous
- Alternanthera nodiflora R.Br. accepted as Alternanthera sessilis (L.) DC. not indigenous
- Alternanthera pungens Kunth, not indigenous
- Alternanthera sessilis (L.) DC. not indigenous, invasive

=== Amaranthus ===
Genus Amaranthus:

- Amaranthus blitoides S.Watson, not indigenous
- Amaranthus capensis Thell. indigenous
  - Amaranthus capensis Thell. subsp. capensis, endemic
  - Amaranthus capensis Thell. subsp. uncinatus (Thell.) Brenan, endemic
- Amaranthus deflexus L. not indigenous
- Amaranthus dinteri Schinz, indigenous
  - Amaranthus dinteri Schinz subsp. brevipetiolatus Brenan, endemic
  - Amaranthus dinteri Schinz subsp. dinterivar. a, indigenous
  - Amaranthus dinteri Schinz subsp. dinterivar. b, indigenous
- Amaranthus dubius Mart. ex Thell. not indigenous
- Amaranthus graecizans L. subsp. graecizans, not indigenous
- Amaranthus hybridus L. subsp. hybridus var. hybridus, not indigenous
  - Amaranthus hybridus L. subsp. cruentus(L.) Thell. not indigenous
  - Amaranthus hybridus L. subsp. hybridus var. erythrostachys, not indigenous
- Amaranthus lividus L. subsp. polygonoides (Moq.) Probst, not indigenous
- Amaranthus muricatus (Moq.) Hieron. not indigenous
- Amaranthus praetermissus Brenan, indigenous
- Amaranthus retroflexus L. var. retroflexus, not indigenous
  - Amaranthus retroflexus L. var. delilei (Richt. & Loret) Thell. not indigenous
- Amaranthus schinzianus Thell. indigenous
- Amaranthus spinosus L. not indigenous
- Amaranthus standleyanus Parodi ex Covas, not indigenous
- Amaranthus thunbergii Moq. indigenous
- Amaranthus viridis L. not indigenous

=== Arthrocnemum ===
Formerly accepted genus Arthrocnemum:

- Arthrocnemum indicum (Willd.) Moq., accepted as Tecticornia indica (Willd.) K.A.Sheph. & Paul G.Wilson, indigenous
- Arthrocnemum perenne (Mill.) Moss ex Fourc., accepted as Salicornia perennis Mill.

=== Atriplex ===
Genus Atriplex:

- Atriplex cinerea Poir. indigenous
  - Atriplex cinerea Poir. subsp. bolusii (C.H.Wright) Aellen var. adamsonii, indigenous
  - Atriplex cinerea Poir. subsp. bolusii (C.H.Wright) Aellen var. genuina, not indigenous
- Atriplex eardleyae Aellen, not indigenous
- Atriplex erosa G.Bruckn. & I.Verd. endemic
- Atriplex hortensis L. not indigenous
- Atriplex inflata F.Muell. accepted as Atriplex lindleyi Moq. subsp. inflata (F.Muell.) Paul G.Wilson, not indigenous, invasive
- Atriplex lindleyi Moq. subsp. inflata (F.Muell.) Paul G.Wilson, not indigenous, invasive
  - Atriplex lindleyi Moq. subsp. quadripartita Paul G.Wilson, not indigenous
- Atriplex littoralis L. not indigenous
- Atriplex muelleri Benth. not indigenous
- Atriplex nitens Schkuhr, not indigenous
- Atriplex nummularia Lindl. accepted as Atriplex nummularia Lindl. subsp. nummularia, not indigenous
  - Atriplex nummularia Lindl. subsp. nummularia, not indigenous, invasive
- Atriplex patula L. indigenous
  - Atriplex patula L. subsp. austro-africana Aellen, indigenous
  - Atriplex patula L. subsp. verreauxii Aellen, not indigenous
- Atriplex rosea L. not indigenous
- Atriplex semibaccata R.Br. not indigenous, invasive
- Atriplex spongiosa F.Muell. not indigenous
- Atriplex suberecta I.Verd. indigenous
- Atriplex vestita (Thunb.) Aellen, indigenous
  - Atriplex vestita (Thunb.) Aellen var. appendiculata Aellen, indigenous
  - Atriplex vestita (Thunb.) Aellen var. inappendiculata Aellen, endemic

=== Bassia ===
Genus Bassia:

- Bassia diffusa (Thunb.) Kuntze, accepted as Chenolea diffusa Thunb. indigenous
- Bassia dinteri (Botsch.) A.J.Scott, indigenous
- Bassia indica (Wight) A.J.Scott, not indigenous
- Bassia salsoloides (Fenzl) A.J.Scott, indigenous

=== Beta ===
Genus Beta:

- Beta vulgaris L. subsp. vulgaris, not indigenous

=== Calicorema ===
Genus Calicorema:

- Calicorema capitata (Moq.) Hook.f. indigenous
- Calicorema squarrosa (Schinz) Schinz, indigenous

=== Celosia ===
Genus Celosia:

- Celosia argentea L. forma argentea, not indigenous
- Celosia nervosa C.C.Towns. endemic
- Celosia trigyna L. indigenous

=== Centema ===
Genus Centema:

- Centema subfusca (Moq.) T.Cooke, indigenous

=== Chenolea ===
Genus Chenolea:

- Chenolea convallis Snijman & J.C.Manning, endemic
- Chenolea diffusa Thunb. indigenous
- Chenolea dinteri Botsch. accepted as Bassia dinteri (Botsch.) A.J.Scott, indigenous

=== Chenoleoides ===
Genus Chenoleoides:

- Chenoleoides dinteri (Botsch.) Botsch. accepted as Bassia dinteri (Botsch.) A.J.Scott, indigenous

=== Chenopodium ===
Genus Chenopodium:

- Chenopodium album L. not indigenous
- Chenopodium ambrosioides L. accepted as Dysphania ambrosioides (L.) Mosyakin, not indigenous
- Chenopodium botryodes Sm. not indigenous
- Chenopodium carinatum R.Br. not indigenous
- Chenopodium cristatum (F.Muell.) F.Muell. accepted as Dysphania cristata (F.Muell.) Mosyakin, not indigenous
- Chenopodium foliosum Asch. not indigenous
- Chenopodium giganteum D.Don, not indigenous
- Chenopodium glaucum L. not indigenous
- Chenopodium hederiforme (Murr) Aellen, indigenous
  - Chenopodium hederiforme (Murr) Aellen var. dentatum Aellen, indigenous
  - Chenopodium hederiforme (Murr) Aellen var. undulatum Aellen, indigenous
- Chenopodium hircinum Schrad. not indigenous
- Chenopodium mucronatum Thunb. indigenous
- Chenopodium multifidum L. accepted as Dysphania multifida (L.) Mosyakin & Clemants, not indigenous
- Chenopodium murale L. var. murale, not indigenous
- Chenopodium olukondae (Murr) Murr, indigenous
- Chenopodium opulifolium Schrad. ex W.D.J.Koch & Ziz var. opulifolium, not indigenous
- Chenopodium petiolariforme (Aellen) Aellen, indigenous
- Chenopodium phillipsianum Aellen, not indigenous
- Chenopodium polyspermum L. not indigenous
- Chenopodium pumilio R.Br. not indigenous
- Chenopodium schraderianum Roem. & Schult. not indigenous
- Chenopodium sericeum (Aiton) Spreng. accepted as Chenolea diffusa Thunb. indigenous
- Chenopodium stellulatum (Benth.) Aellen, not indigenous
- Chenopodium x bontei Aellen, not indigenous

=== Cyathula ===
Genus Cyathula:

- Cyathula cylindrica Moq. indigenous
  - Cyathula cylindrica Moq. var. cylindrica, indigenous
- Cyathula lanceolata Schinz, indigenous
- Cyathula natalensis Sond. indigenous
- Cyathula orthacantha (Hochst. ex Asch.) Schinz, indigenous
- Cyathula uncinulata (Schrad.) Schinz, indigenous

=== Dysphania ===
Genus Dysphania:

- Dysphania ambrosioides (L.) Mosyakin, not indigenous, invasive
- Dysphania cristata (F.Muell.) Mosyakin, not indigenous, invasive
- Dysphania multifida (L.) Mosyakin & Clemants, not indigenous, invasive

=== Echinopsilon ===
Genus Echinopsilon:

- Echinopsilon diffusum (Hornst.) Moq. accepted as Chenolea diffusa Thunb. indigenous
- Echinopsilon sericeum (Aiton) Moq. accepted as Chenolea diffusa Thunb. indigenous

=== Einadia ===
Genus Einadia:

- Einadia nutans (R.Br.) A.J.Scott subsp. nutans, not indigenous

=== Exomis ===
Genus Exomis:

- Exomis microphylla (Thunb.) Aellen, indigenous
  - Exomis microphylla (Thunb.) Aellen var. axyrioides (Fenzl) Aellen, endemic

=== Gomphrena ===
Genus Gomphrena:

- Gomphrena celosioides Mart. not indigenous
- Gomphrena globosa L. not indigenous

=== Guilleminea ===
Genus Guilleminea:

- Guilleminea densa (Willd. ex Roem. & Schult.) Moq. not indigenous

=== Halopeplis ===
Genus Halopeplis:

- Halopeplis amplexicaulis (Vahl) Ung.-Sternb. ex Ces. Pass. & Gibelli, not indigenous

=== Halosarcia ===
Genus Halosarcia:

- Halosarcia indica (Willd.) Paul G.Wilson, accepted as Tecticornia indica (Willd.) K.A.Sheph. & Paul G.Wilson, indigenous

=== Hermbstaedtia ===
Genus Hermbstaedtia:

- Hermbstaedtia afra (Meisn.) Moq. endemic
- Hermbstaedtia capitata Schinz, endemic
- Hermbstaedtia fleckii (Schinz) Baker & C.B.Clarke, indigenous
- Hermbstaedtia glauca (J.C.Wendl.) Rchb. ex Steud. indigenous
- Hermbstaedtia odorata (Burch.) T.Cooke, indigenous
  - Hermbstaedtia odorata (Burch.) T.Cooke var. albi-rosea Suess. indigenous
  - Hermbstaedtia odorata (Burch.) T.Cooke var. aurantiaca (Suess.) C.C.Towns. indigenous
  - Hermbstaedtia odorata (Burch.) T.Cooke var. odorata, indigenous
- Hermbstaedtia rogersii Burtt Davy, endemic
- Hermbstaedtia schaeferi (Schinz) Schinz & Dinter, indigenous

=== Kochia ===
Genus Kochia:

- Kochia ciliata F.Muell. not indigenous
- Kochia indica Wight, accepted as Bassia indica (Wight) A.J.Scott, unconfirmed
- Kochia salsoloides Fenzl, accepted as Bassia salsoloides (Fenzl) A.J.Scott, indigenous
- Kochia sericea (Aiton) Schrad. accepted as Chenolea diffusa Thunb. indigenous
- Kochia tomentosa (Moq.) F.Muell. not indigenous
  - Kochia tomentosa (Moq.) F.Muell. var. tenuifolia F.Muell. not indigenous
- Kochia tricophylla Stapf, not indigenous

=== Kyphocarpa ===
Genus Kyphocarpa:

- Kyphocarpa angustifolia (Moq.) Lopr. indigenous
- Kyphocarpa cruciata (Schinz) Schinz, indigenous
- Kyphocarpa trichinoides (Fenzl) Lopr. endemic

=== Leucosphaera ===
Genus Leucosphaera:

- Leucosphaera bainesii (Hook.f.) Gilg, indigenous

=== Manochlamys ===
Genus Manochlamys:

- Manochlamys albicans (Aiton) Aellen, indigenous

=== Nothosaerva ===
Genus Nothosaerva:

- Nothosaerva brachiata (L.) Wight, indigenous

=== Psilotrichum ===
Genus Psilotrichum:

- Psilotrichum scleranthum Thwaites, indigenous

=== Pupalia ===
Genus Pupalia:

- Pupalia lappacea (L.) A.Juss. indigenous
  - Pupalia lappacea (L.) A.Juss. var. lappacea, indigenous

=== Salicornia ===
Genus Salicornia:

- Salicornia indica Willd., accepted as Tecticornia indica (Willd.) K.A.Sheph. & Paul G.Wilson, indigenous
- Salicornia meyeriana Moss, indigenous
- Salicornia pachystachya Bunge ex Ung.-Sternb. indigenous
- Salicornia perrieri A.Chev. indigenous
- Salicornia radicans Sm., accepted as Salicornia perennis Mill., present
- Salicornia uniflora Toelken, indigenous

=== Salsola ===
Genus Salsola:

- Salsola acocksii Botsch. indigenous
- Salsola adisca Botsch. endemic
- Salsola adversariifolia Botsch. endemic
- Salsola aellenii Botsch. endemic
- Salsola albida Botsch. indigenous
- Salsola angolensis Botsch. indigenous
- Salsola aphylla L.f. indigenous
- Salsola apiciflora Botsch. endemic
- Salsola apterygea Botsch. endemic
- Salsola araneosa Botsch. indigenous
- Salsola arborea C.A.Sm. ex Aellen, indigenous
- Salsola armata C.A.Sm. ex Aellen, indigenous
- Salsola atrata Botsch. endemic
- Salsola australis R.Br. accepted as Salsola kali L. not indigenous
- Salsola barbata Aellen, indigenous
- Salsola calluna Fenzl ex C.H.Wright, endemic
- Salsola capensis Botsch. endemic
- Salsola ceresica Botsch. endemic
- Salsola columnaris Botsch. indigenous
- Salsola contrariifolia Botsch. indigenous
- Salsola cryptoptera Aellen, indigenous
- Salsola dealata Botsch. endemic
- Salsola decussata C.A.Sm. ex Botsch. endemic
- Salsola denudata Botsch. indigenous
- Salsola diffusa (Hornst.) Thunb. accepted as Chenolea diffusa Thunb. indigenous
- Salsola esterhuyseniae Botsch. endemic
- Salsola exalata Botsch. endemic
- Salsola geminiflora Fenzl ex C.H.Wright, endemic
- Salsola gemmifera Botsch. indigenous
- Salsola gemmipara Botsch. indigenous
- Salsola glabrescens Burtt Davy, indigenous
- Salsola henriciae I.Verd. endemic
- Salsola humifusa A.Bruckn. indigenous
- Salsola inaperta Botsch. indigenous
- Salsola kalaharica Botsch. endemic
- Salsola kali L. not indigenous, invasive
- Salsola koichabica Botsch. indigenous
- Salsola marginata Botsch. indigenous
- Salsola melanantha Botsch. indigenous
- Salsola merxmuelleri Aellen, indigenous
- Salsola microtricha Botsch. endemic
- Salsola minutiflora C.A.Sm. ex Ulbr. accepted as Salsola armata C.A.Sm. ex Aellen, present
- Salsola minutifolia Botsch. endemic
- Salsola namaqualandica Botsch. indigenous
- Salsola nollothensis Aellen, indigenous
- Salsola patentipilosa Botsch. endemic
- Salsola phillipsii Botsch. indigenous
- Salsola procera Botsch. indigenous
- Salsola ptiloptera Botsch. indigenous
- Salsola rabieana I.Verd. indigenous
- Salsola robinsonii Botsch. indigenous
- Salsola scopiformis Botsch. indigenous
- Salsola seminuda Botsch. indigenous
- Salsola sericata Botsch. indigenous
- Salsola sericea Aiton, accepted as Chenolea diffusa Thunb. indigenous
- Salsola smithii Botsch. endemic
- Salsola squarrosula Botsch. indigenous
- Salsola tetramera Botsch. endemic
- Salsola tragus L. accepted as Salsola kali L. not indigenous, invasive
- Salsola tuberculata (Moq.) Fenzl, indigenous
- Salsola tuberculatiformis Botsch. indigenous
- Salsola verdoorniae Toelken, endemic
- Salsola zeyheri (Moq.) Bunge, indigenous

=== Sarcocornia ===
Genus Sarcocornia:

- Sarcocornia capensis (Moss) A.J.Scott, endemic
- Sarcocornia decumbens (Toelken) A.J.Scott, endemic
- Sarcocornia decussata S.Steffen, Mucina & G.Kadereit, endemic
- Sarcocornia freitagii S.Steffen, Mucina & G.Kadereit, endemic
- Sarcocornia littorea (Moss) A.J.Scott, endemic
- Sarcocornia mossiana (Toelken) A.J.Scott, endemic
- Sarcocornia natalensis (Bunge ex Ung.-Sternb.) A.J.Scott, indigenous
  - Sarcocornia natalensis (Bunge ex Ung.-Sternb.) A.J.Scott var. affinis (Moss) O'Call. indigenous
  - Sarcocornia natalensis (Bunge ex Ung.-Sternb.) A.J.Scott var. natalensis, indigenous
- Sarcocornia perennis (Mill.) A.J.Scott, accepted as Salicornia perennis, indigenous
  - Sarcocornia perennis (Mill.) A.J.Scott var. lignosa (Woods) O'Call. indigenous
  - Sarcocornia perennis (Mill.) A.J.Scott var. perennis, indigenous
- Sarcocornia pillansii (Moss) A.J.Scott, indigenous
  - Sarcocornia pillansii (Moss) A.J.Scott var. pillansii, indigenous
- Sarcocornia tegetaria S.Steffen, Mucina & G.Kadereit, indigenous
- Sarcocornia terminalis (Toelken) A.J.Scott, endemic
- Sarcocornia xerophila (Toelken) A.J.Scott, endemic

=== Sericocoma ===
Genus Sericocoma:

- Sericocoma avolans Fenzl, indigenous
- Sericocoma heterochiton Lopr. indigenous
- Sericocoma pungens Fenzl, indigenous

=== Sericorema ===
Genus Sericorema:

- Sericorema remotiflora (Hook.f.) Lopr. indigenous
- Sericorema sericea (Schinz) Lopr. indigenous

=== Suaeda ===
Genus Suaeda:

- Suaeda caespitosa Wolley-Dod, indigenous
- Suaeda fruticosa (L.) Forssk. indigenous
- Suaeda inflata Aellen, indigenous
- Suaeda merxmuelleri Aellen, indigenous

=== Tecticornia ===
Genus Tecticornia:

- Tecticornia indica (Willd.) K.A.Sheph. & Paul G.Wilson, indigenous

== Anacampserotaceae ==
Family: Anacampserotaceae,

=== Anacampseros ===
Genus Anacampseros:

- Anacampseros albidiflora Poelln. endemic
- Anacampseros albissima Marloth, accepted as Avonia albissima (Marloth) G.D.Rowley, present
- Anacampseros arachnoides (Haw.) Sims, endemic
  - Anacampseros arachnoides (Haw.) Sims subsp. grandiflora Sond. accepted as Anacampseros rufescens (Haw.) Sweet, present
- Anacampseros baeseckei Dinter, indigenous
- Anacampseros bayeriana S.A.Hammer, indigenous
- Anacampseros buderiana Poelln. accepted as Avonia recurvata (Schonland) G.D.Rowley subsp. buderiana (Poelln.) G.Will. present
- Anacampseros comptonii Pillans, endemic
- Anacampseros decapitata Burgoyne & J.van Thiel, endemic
- Anacampseros filamentosa (Haw.) Sims, indigenous
  - Anacampseros filamentosa (Haw.) Sims subsp. filamentosa, endemic
  - Anacampseros filamentosa (Haw.) Sims subsp. namaquensis (H.Pearson & Stephens) G.D.Rowley, indigenous
  - Anacampseros filamentosa (Haw.) Sims subsp. tomentosa (A.Berger) Gerbaulet, indigenous
- Anacampseros gariepensis (G.Will.) Dreher, indigenous
- Anacampseros herreana Poelln. accepted as Avonia herreana (Poelln.) G.D.Rowley, present
- Anacampseros hillii G.Will. endemic
- Anacampseros karasmontana Dinter ex Poelln. indigenous
- Anacampseros lanceolata (Haw.) Sweet, indigenous
  - Anacampseros lanceolata (Haw.) Sweet subsp. lanceolata, endemic
  - Anacampseros lanceolata (Haw.) Sweet subsp. nebrownii (Poelln.) Gerbaulet, endemic
- Anacampseros lubbersii Bleck, accepted as Anacampseros subnuda Poelln. subsp. lubbersii (Bleck) Gerbaulet, present
- Anacampseros mallei (G.Will.) G.Will. accepted as Avonia mallei G.Will. present
- Anacampseros marlothii Poelln. endemic
- Anacampseros namaquensis H.Pearson & Stephens, accepted as Anacampseros filamentosa (Haw.) Sims subsp. namaquensis (H.Pearson & Stephens) G.D.Rowley, present
- Anacampseros papyracea E.Mey. ex Fenzl, accepted as Avonia papyracea (E.Mey. ex Fenzl) G.D.Rowley subsp. papyracea, indigenous
  - Anacampseros papyracea E.Mey. ex Fenzl subsp. namaensis Gerbaulet, accepted as Avonia papyracea (E.Mey. ex Fenzl) G.D.Rowley subsp. namaensis (Gerbaulet) G.D.Rowley, present
- Anacampseros pisina G.Will. endemic
- Anacampseros prominens G.Will. accepted as Avonia prominens (G.Will.) G.Will. present
- Anacampseros quinaria E.Mey. ex Fenzl, indigenous
- Anacampseros recurvata Schonland, accepted as Avonia recurvata (Schonland) G.D.Rowley
  - Anacampseros recurvata Schonland subsp. buderiana (Poelln.) Gerbaulet, accepted as Avonia recurvata (Schonland) G.D.Rowley subsp. buderiana (Poelln.) G.Will. present
  - Anacampseros recurvata Schonland subsp. minuta Gerbaulet, accepted as Avonia recurvata (Schonland) G.D.Rowley subsp. minuta (Gerbaulet) G.D.Rowley, present
- Anacampseros retusa Poelln. indigenous
  - Anacampseros retusa Poelln. forma parva G.Will. endemic
  - Anacampseros retusa Poelln. forma rubra G.Will. endemic
  - Anacampseros retusa Poelln. subsp. lanuginosa G.Will. endemic
  - Anacampseros retusa Poelln. subsp. retusa var. retusa, indigenous
- Anacampseros rhodesica N.E.Br. accepted as Avonia rhodesica (N.E.Br.) G.D.Rowley, present
- Anacampseros rufescens (Haw.) Sweet, indigenous
- Anacampseros scopata G.Will. endemic
- Anacampseros subnuda Poelln. indigenous
  - Anacampseros subnuda Poelln. subsp. lubbersii (Bleck) Gerbaulet, endemic
  - Anacampseros subnuda Poelln. subsp. subnuda, indigenous
- Anacampseros telephiastrum DC. endemic
- Anacampseros ustulata E.Mey. ex Fenzl, accepted as Avonia ustulata (E.Mey. ex Fenzl) G.D.Rowley, present
- Anacampseros vanthielii G.Will. endemic

=== Avonia ===
Genus Avonia:

- Avonia albissima (Marloth) G.D.Rowley, indigenous
- Avonia gariepensis G.Will. accepted as Anacampseros gariepensis (G.Will.) Dreher, indigenous
- Avonia herreana (Poelln.) G.D.Rowley, endemic
- Avonia mallei G.Will. endemic
- Avonia papyracea (E.Mey. ex Fenzl) G.D.Rowley, indigenous
  - Avonia papyracea (E.Mey. ex Fenzl) G.D.Rowley subsp. namaensis (Gerbaulet) G.D.Rowley, indigenous
  - Avonia papyracea (E.Mey. ex Fenzl) G.D.Rowley subsp. papyracea, indigenous
- Avonia perplexa G.Will. indigenous
- Avonia prominens (G.Will.) G.Will. endemic
- Avonia quinaria (E.Mey. ex Fenzl) G.D.Rowley, accepted as Anacampseros quinaria E.Mey. ex Fenzl, indigenous
  - Avonia quinaria (E.Mey. ex Fenzl) G.D.Rowley subsp. alstonii (Schonland) G.D.Rowley, accepted as Anacampseros quinaria E.Mey. ex Fenzl, indigenous
- Avonia recurvata (Schonland) G.D.Rowley, indigenous
  - Avonia recurvata (Schonland) G.D.Rowley subsp. buderiana (Poelln.) G.Will. endemic
  - Avonia recurvata (Schonland) G.D.Rowley subsp. minuta (Gerbaulet) G.D.Rowley, endemic
  - Avonia recurvata (Schonland) G.D.Rowley subsp. recurvata, endemic
- Avonia rhodesica (N.E.Br.) G.D.Rowley, indigenous
- Avonia ruschii (Dinter & Poelln.) G.D.Rowley, indigenous
- Avonia ustulata (E.Mey. ex Fenzl) G.D.Rowley, endemic
- Avonia variabilis (Poelln.) G.Will. indigenous

=== Talinum ===
Genus Talinum:

- Talinum afrum (Thunb.) Eckl. & Zeyh. indigenous
- Talinum arnotii Hook.f. indigenous
- Talinum crispatulum Dinter & Poelln. indigenous
- Talinum decumbens (Forssk.) Willd. accepted as Corbichonia decumbens (Forssk.) Exell, indigenous
- Talinum paniculatum (Jacq.) Gaertn. not indigenous, cultivated
- Talinum portulacifolium (Forssk.) Asch. ex Schweinf. indigenous
- Talinum tenuissimum Dinter, indigenous

== Basellaceae ==
Family: Basellaceae,

- Anredera cordifolia (Ten.) Steenis, not indigenous, naturalised, invasive
- Basella paniculata Volkens, indigenous

== Cactaceae ==
Family: Cactaceae,

=== Austrocylindropuntia ===
Genus Austrocylindropuntia:

- Austrocylindropuntia cylindrica (Juss. ex Lam.) Backeb. not indigenous, naturalised, invasive
- Austrocylindropuntia subulata (Muehlenpf.) Backeb. not indigenous, naturalised
  - Austrocylindropuntia subulata (Muehlenpf.) Backeb. subsp. exaltata (A.Berger) D.R.Hunt, accepted as Austrocylindropuntia subulata (Muehlenpf.) Backeb. not indigenous, naturalised, invasive
- Austrocylindropuntia vestita (Salm-Dyck) Backeb. not indigenous, cultivated, naturalised

=== Cereus ===
Genus Cereus:

- Cereus hexagonus (L.) Mill. not indigenous, naturalised, invasive
- Cereus hildmannianus K.Schum. not indigenous, naturalised, invasive
- Cereus jamacaru DC. not indigenous, naturalised, invasive
- Cereus jamacaru DC. subsp. jamacaru, not indigenous, naturalised, invasive

=== Cylindropuntia ===
Genus Cylindropuntia:

- Cylindropuntia fulgida (Engelm.) F.M.Knuth, not indigenous, naturalised
  - Cylindropuntia fulgida (Engelm.) F.M.Knuth var. fulgida, not indigenous, naturalised, invasive
  - Cylindropuntia fulgida (Engelm.) F.M.Knuth var. mamillata (A.Schott ex Engelm.) Backeb. not indigenous, naturalised, invasive
- Cylindropuntia imbricata (Haw.) F.M.Knuth, not indigenous, naturalised, invasive
- Cylindropuntia leptocaulis (DC.) F.M.Knuth, not indigenous, naturalised, invasive
- Cylindropuntia pallida (Rose) F.M.Knuth, not indigenous, naturalised, invasive
- Cylindropuntia spinosior (Engelm.) F.M.Knuth, not indigenous, naturalised, invasive

=== Echinocactus ===
Genus Echinocactus:

- Echinocactus oxygonus Link, accepted as Echinopsis oxygona Link & Otto, cultivated

=== Echinopsis ===
Genus Echinopsis:

- Echinopsis oxygona Link & Otto, not indigenous, naturalised
- Echinopsis schickendantzii F.A.C.Weber, not indigenous, naturalised, invasive

=== Harrisia ===
Genus Harrisia:

- Harrisia balansae (K.Schum.) N.P.Taylor & Zappi, accepted as Harrisia bonplandii (Pfeiff.) Britton & Rose, not indigenous, naturalised, invasive
- Harrisia bonplandii (Pfeiff.) Britton & Rose, not indigenous, naturalised, invasive
- Harrisia martinii (Labour.) Britton, not indigenous, naturalised, invasive
- Harrisia pomanensis (F.A.C.Weber) Britton & Rose, not indigenous, naturalised, invasive
- Harrisia tortuosa (J.Forbes ex Otto & A.Dietr.) Britton & Rose, not indigenous, naturalised, invasive

=== Hylocereus ===
Genus Hylocereus:

- Hylocereus undatus (Haw.) Britton & Rose, not indigenous, naturalised, invasive

=== Myrtillocactus ===
Genus Myrtillocactus:

- Myrtillocactus geometrizans Console, not indigenous, naturalised, invasive

=== Nopalea ===
Genus Nopalea:

- Nopalea cochenillifera (L.) Salm-Dyck, accepted as Opuntia cochenillifera (L.) Mill. not indigenous, cultivated, naturalised, invasive

=== Opuntia ===
Genus Opuntia:

- Opuntia aurantiaca Lindl. not indigenous, naturalised, invasive
- Opuntia dillenii (Ker Gawl.) Haw. accepted as Opuntia stricta (Haw.) Haw. not indigenous, naturalised
- Opuntia elata Salm-Dyck [1], not indigenous, naturalised, invasive
- Opuntia engelmannii Salm-Dyck ex Engelm. not indigenous, naturalised, invasive
- Opuntia exaltata A.Berger, accepted as Austrocylindropuntia subulata (Muehlenpf.) Backeb. not indigenous, naturalised
- Opuntia ficus-indica (L.) Mill. not indigenous, cultivated, naturalised, invasive
- Opuntia humifusa (Raf.) Raf. not indigenous, naturalised, invasive
- Opuntia imbricata (Haw.) DC. accepted as Cylindropuntia imbricata (Haw.) F.M.Knuth, not indigenous, naturalised
- Opuntia leptocaulis DC. accepted as Cylindropuntia leptocaulis (DC.) F.M.Knuth, not indigenous, naturalised
- Opuntia leucotricha DC. not indigenous, naturalised, invasive
- Opuntia lindheimeri Engelm. accepted as Opuntia engelmannii Salm-Dyck ex Engelm. not indigenous, naturalised
- Opuntia microdasys (Lehm.) Pfeiff. not indigenous, naturalised, invasive
- Opuntia monacantha Haw. not indigenous, cultivated, naturalised, invasive
- Opuntia pubescens J.C.Wendl. ex Pfeiff. not indigenous, naturalised, invasive
- Opuntia pumila Rose, accepted as Opuntia pubescens J.C.Wendl. ex Pfeiff.
- Opuntia robusta H.Wendl. ex Pfeiff. not indigenous, naturalised, invasive
- Opuntia rosea DC. accepted as Cylindropuntia imbricata (Haw.) F.M.Knuth, not indigenous, naturalised, invasive
- Opuntia salmiana J.Parm. ex Pfeiff. not indigenous, naturalised, invasive
- Opuntia spinulifera Salm-Dyck, not indigenous, cultivated, naturalised, invasive
- Opuntia stricta (Haw.) Haw. not indigenous, naturalised, invasive
  - Opuntia stricta (Haw.) Haw. var. dillenii (Ker Gawl.) L.D.Benson, not indigenous, naturalised, invasive
  - Opuntia stricta (Haw.) Haw. var. stricta, not indigenous, naturalised, invasive
- Opuntia tomentosa Salm-Dyck, not indigenous, naturalised, invasive

=== Peniocereus ===
Genus Peniocereus:

- Peniocereus serpentinus (Lag. & Rodr.) N.P.Taylor, not indigenous, naturalised, invasive

=== Pereskia ===
Genus Pereskia:

- Pereskia aculeata Mill. not indigenous, naturalised, invasive

=== Rhipsalis ===
Genus Rhipsalis:

- Rhipsalis baccifera (Sol.) Stearn, indigenous
  - Rhipsalis baccifera (Sol.) Stearn subsp. mauritiana (DC.) Barthlott, indigenous

=== Stenocereus ===
Genus Stenocereus:

- Stenocereus pruinosus (Otto ex Pfeiff.) Buxb. not indigenous, cultivated, naturalised

=== Tephrocactus ===
Genus Tephrocactus:

- Tephrocactus articulatus (Pfeiff.) Backeb. not indigenous, naturalised, invasive

=== Trichocereus ===
Genus Trichocereus:

- Trichocereus macrogonus (Salm-Dyck) Riccob. var. pachanoi (Britton & Rose) Albesiano & R.Kiesling, not indigenous, cultivated, naturalised, invasive

== Caryophyllaceae ==
Family: Caryophyllaceae,

=== Agrostemma ===
Genus Agrostemma:

- Agrostemma githago L. subsp. githago, not indigenous, naturalised

=== Arenaria ===
Genus Arenaria:

- Arenaria diffusa Elliott, not indigenous, naturalised
- Arenaria fendleri A.Gray, not indigenous, naturalised

=== Cerastium ===
Genus Cerastium:

- Cerastium arabidis E.Mey. ex Fenzl, indigenous
- Cerastium capense Sond. indigenous
- Cerastium dichotomum L. endemic
- Cerastium fontanum Baumg. not indigenous, naturalised, invasive
  - Cerastium fontanum Baumg. subsp. vulgare (Hartm.) Greuter & Burdet, not indigenous, naturalised, invasive
- Cerastium glomeratum Thuill. indigenous
- Cerastium indicum Wight & Arn. indigenous

=== Corrigiola ===
Genus Corrigiola:

- Corrigiola capensis Willd. indigenous
  - Corrigiola capensis Willd. subsp. capensis, endemic
- Corrigiola litoralis L. indigenous
  - Corrigiola litoralis L. subsp. litoralis var. litoralis, indigenous
  - Corrigiola litoralis L. subsp. litoralis var. perennans, indigenous

=== Dianthus ===
Genus Dianthus:

- Dianthus albens Aiton, endemic
- Dianthus basuticus Burtt Davy, indigenous
  - Dianthus basuticus Burtt Davy subsp. basuticus var. basuticus, indigenous
  - Dianthus basuticus Burtt Davy subsp. basuticus var. grandiflorus, indigenous
  - Dianthus basuticus Burtt Davy subsp. fourcadei S.S.Hooper, endemic
- Dianthus bolusii Burtt Davy, endemic
- Dianthus burchellii Ser. indigenous
- Dianthus caespitosus Thunb. indigenous
  - Dianthus caespitosus Thunb. subsp. caespitosus, endemic
  - Dianthus caespitosus Thunb. subsp. pectinatus (E.Mey. ex Sond.) S.S.Hooper, endemic
- Dianthus crenatus Thunb. endemic
- Dianthus holopetalus Turcz. endemic
- Dianthus kamisbergensis Sond. endemic
- Dianthus laingsburgensis S.S.Hooper, endemic
- Dianthus micropetalus Ser. indigenous
- Dianthus mooiensis F.N.Williams, indigenous
  - Dianthus mooiensis F.N.Williams subsp. kirkii (Burtt Davy) S.S.Hooper, indigenous
  - Dianthus mooiensis F.N.Williams subsp. mooiensis var. dentatus, endemic
  - Dianthus mooiensis F.N.Williams subsp. mooiensis var. mooiensis, endemic
- Dianthus namaensis Schinz, indigenous
  - Dianthus namaensis Schinz var. dinteri (Schinz) S.S.Hooper, indigenous
  - Dianthus namaensis Schinz var. junceus (Burtt Davy) S.S.Hooper, endemic
  - Dianthus namaensis Schinz var. namaensis, indigenous
- Dianthus thunbergii S.S.Hooper, indigenous
  - Dianthus thunbergii S.S.Hooper forma maritimus S.S.Hooper, endemic
  - Dianthus thunbergii S.S.Hooper forma thunbergii, endemic
- Dianthus transvaalensis Burtt Davy, indigenous
- Dianthus zeyheri Sond. indigenous
  - Dianthus zeyheri Sond. subsp. natalensis S.S.Hooper, indigenous
  - Dianthus zeyheri Sond. subsp. zeyheri, endemic

=== Drymaria ===
Genus Drymaria:

- Drymaria cordata (L.) Willd. ex Roem. & Schult. not indigenous, naturalised, invasive
  - Drymaria cordata (L.) Willd. ex Roem. & Schult. subsp. diandra (Blume) J.A.Duke, not indigenous, naturalised, invasive

=== Herniaria ===
Genus Herniaria:

- Herniaria capensis Bartl. endemic
- Herniaria erckertii Herm. indigenous
  - Herniaria erckertii Herm. subsp. erckertii, indigenous
  - Herniaria erckertii Herm. subsp. erckertii var. dewetii, accepted as Herniaria erckertii Herm. subsp. erckertii, present
  - Herniaria erckertii Herm. subsp. erckertii var. dinteri, accepted as Herniaria erckertii Herm. subsp. erckertii, present
  - Herniaria erckertii Herm. subsp. erckertii var. erckertii, accepted as Herniaria erckertii Herm. subsp. erckertii, present
  - Herniaria erckertii Herm. subsp. pulvinata Chaudhri, endemic
- Herniaria grimmii Herm. indigenous
- Herniaria pearsonii Chaudhri, endemic
- Herniaria schlechteri Herm. endemic

=== Holosteum ===
Genus Holosteum:

- Holosteum umbellatum L. subsp. umbellatum, not indigenous, naturalised

=== Krauseola ===
Genus Krauseola:

- Krauseola mosambicina (Moss) Pax & K.Hoffm. endemic

=== Moenchia ===
Genus Moenchia:

- Moenchia erecta (L.) Gaertn. subsp. erecta, not indigenous, naturalised

=== Paronychia ===
Genus Paronychia:

- Paronychia brasiliana DC. not indigenous, naturalised
  - Paronychia brasiliana DC. var. pubescens Chaudhri, not indigenous, naturalised

=== Petrorhagia ===
Genus Petrorhagia:

- Petrorhagia prolifera (L.) Ball & Heywood, not indigenous, naturalised

=== Pollichia ===
Genus Pollichia:

- Pollichia campestris Aiton, indigenous

=== Polycarpaea ===
Genus Polycarpaea:

- Polycarpaea corymbosa (L.) Lam. var. corymbosa, not indigenous, naturalised
- Polycarpaea eriantha Hochst. ex A.Rich. indigenous
  - Polycarpaea eriantha Hochst. ex A.Rich. var. effusa (Oliv.) Turrill, indigenous

=== Polycarpon ===
Genus Polycarpon:

- Polycarpon prostratum (Forssk.) Asch. & Schweinf. indigenous
  - Polycarpon prostratum (Forssk.) Asch. & Schweinf. var. prostratum, indigenous
- Polycarpon tetraphyllum (L.) L. not indigenous, naturalised
  - Polycarpon tetraphyllum (L.) L. var. tetraphyllum, accepted as Polycarpon tetraphyllum (L.) L. not indigenous, naturalised

=== Sagina ===
Genus Sagina:

- Sagina apetala Ard. not indigenous, naturalised
- Sagina maritima G.Don, not indigenous, naturalised
- Sagina procumbens L. not indigenous, cultivated, naturalised, invasive

=== Saponaria ===
Genus Saponaria:

- Saponaria officinalis L. not indigenous, cultivated

=== Scleranthus ===
Genus Scleranthus:

- Scleranthus annuus L. not indigenous, naturalised

=== Silene ===
Genus Silene:

- Silene aethiopica Burm. indigenous
  - Silene aethiopica Burm. subsp. longiflora J.C.Manning & Goldblatt, indigenous
- Silene bellidioides Sond. indigenous
- Silene burchellii Otth, indigenous
  - Silene burchellii Otth subsp. modesta J.C.Manning & Goldblatt, indigenous
  - Silene burchellii Otth subsp. multiflora J.C.Manning & Goldblatt, indigenous
  - Silene burchellii Otth subsp. pilosellifolia (Cham. & Schltdl.) J.C.Manning & Goldblatt, indigenous
  - Silene burchellii Otth var. angustifolia Sond. accepted as Silene burchellii Otth subsp. pilosellifolia (Cham. & Schltdl.) J.C.Manning & Goldblatt, present
  - Silene burchellii Otth var. burchellii, accepted as Silene burchellii Otth subsp. burchellii, indigenous
  - Silene burchellii Otth var. latifolia Sond. accepted as Silene burchellii Otth subsp. modesta J.C.Manning & Goldblatt, present
  - Silene burchellii Otth var. pilosellifolia, accepted as Silene burchellii Otth subsp. pilosellifolia (Cham. & Schltdl.) J.C.Manning & Goldblatt, present
- Silene clandestina Jacq. accepted as Silene cretica L. present
- Silene crassifolia L. endemic
  - Silene crassifolia L. subsp. crassifolia, endemic
  - Silene crassifolia L. subsp. primuliflora (Eckl. & Zeyh.) J.C.Manning & Goldblatt, endemic
- Silene cretica L. not indigenous, naturalised
- Silene dewinteri Bocquet, indigenous
- Silene dioica (L.) Clairv. not indigenous, cultivated, naturalised
- Silene eckloniana Sond. endemic
- Silene gallica L. not indigenous, naturalised
- Silene mundiana Eckl. & Zeyh. endemic
- Silene ornata Aiton, endemic
- Silene pendula L. not indigenous, naturalised
- Silene pilosellifolia Cham. & Schltdl. accepted as Silene burchellii Otth subsp. pilosellifolia (Cham. & Schltdl.) J.C.Manning & Goldblatt, indigenous
- Silene primuliflora Eckl. & Zeyh. indigenous
  - Silene primuliflora Eckl. & Zeyh. var. ciliata Fenzl ex Sond. accepted as Silene crassifolia L. subsp. primuliflora (Eckl. & Zeyh.) J.C.Manning & Goldblatt, endemic
  - Silene primuliflora Eckl. & Zeyh. var. primuliflora, indigenous
- Silene rigens J.C.Manning & Goldblatt, indigenous
- Silene saldanhensis J.C.Manning & Goldblatt, indigenous
- Silene thunbergiana Bartl. accepted as Silene thunbergiana Eckl. & Zeyh. ex Sond. indigenous
- Silene thunbergiana Eckl. & Zeyh. accepted as Silene thunbergiana Eckl. & Zeyh. ex Sond. indigenous
- Silene thunbergiana Eckl. & Zeyh. ex Sond. endemic
- Silene undulata Aiton, indigenous
  - Silene undulata Aiton subsp. polyantha J.C.Manning & Goldblatt, indigenous
  - Silene undulata Aiton subsp. undulata, indigenous
- Silene vlokii Masson, accepted as Silene primuliflora Eckl. & Zeyh. var. primuliflora, present
- Silene vulgaris (Moench) Garcke, not indigenous, naturalised
  - Silene vulgaris (Moench) Garcke subsp. macrocarpa (Marsden) Jones & Turrill, not indigenous, naturalised
  - Silene vulgaris (Moench) Garcke subsp. vulgaris, not indigenous, naturalised

=== Spergula ===
Genus Spergula:

- Spergula arvensis L. not indigenous, naturalised, invasive

=== Spergularia ===
Genus Spergularia:

- Spergularia bocconei (Scheele) Graebn. not indigenous, naturalised
- Spergularia hanoverensis Simon, endemic
- Spergularia media (L.) C.Presl, not indigenous, naturalised
- Spergularia rubra (L.) J.Presl & C.Presl, not indigenous, naturalised

=== Stellaria ===
Genus Stellaria:

- Stellaria media (L.) Vill. not indigenous, naturalised
- Stellaria pallida (Dumort.) Pire, indigenous
- Stellaria sennii Chiov. not indigenous, naturalised

=== Telephium ===
Genus Telephium:

- Telephium laxiflorum DC. accepted as Corbichonia decumbens (Forssk.) Exell

=== Vaccaria ===
Genus Vaccaria:

- Vaccaria hispanica (Mill.) Rauschert var. hispanica, not indigenous, naturalised

== Corbichoniaceae ==
Family: Corbichoniaceae,

=== Axonotechium ===
Genus Axonotechium:

- Axonotechium trianthemoides (B.Heyne) Fenzl, accepted as Corbichonia decumbens (Forssk.) Exell

=== Corbichonia ===
Genus Corbichonia:

- Corbichonia decumbens (Forssk.) Exell, indigenous
- Corbichonia exellii Sukhor. indigenous

=== Orygia ===
Genus Orygia:

- Orygia decumbens Forssk. accepted as Corbichonia decumbens (Forssk.) Exell, indigenous

== Didiereaceae ==
Family: Didiereaceae,

=== Ceraria ===
Genus Ceraria, accepted as a synonym of Portulacaria:

- Ceraria fruticulosa H.Pearson & Stephens, accepted as Portulacaria fruticulosa (H.Pearson & Stephens) Bruyns & Klak, indigenous
- Ceraria gariepina H.Pearson & Stephens, accepted as Portulacaria namaquensis Sond., indigenous
- Ceraria namaquensis (Sond.) H.Pearson & Stephens, accepted as Portulacaria namaquensis Sond., indigenous
- Ceraria pygmaea (Pillans) G.D.Rowley, accepted as Portulacaria pygmaea Pillans, indigenous
- Ceraria schaeferi Engl. & Schltr. accepted as Portulacaria fruticulosa (H.Pearson & Stephens) Bruyns & Klak

=== Portulacaria ===
Genus Portulacaria:

- Portulacaria afra Jacq. indigenous
- Portulacaria armiana Van Jaarsv. indigenous, near endemic
- Portulacaria fruticulosa (H.Pearson & Stephens) Bruyns & Klak, indigenous
- Portulacaria namaquensis Sond. indigenous
- Portulacaria pygmaea Pillans, indigenous

== Droseraceae ==
Family: Droseraceae,

=== Drosera ===
Genus Drosera:

- Drosera acaulis L.f. endemic
- Drosera admirabilis Debbert, endemic
- Drosera alba E.Phillips, endemic
- Drosera aliciae Raym.-Hamet, endemic
- Drosera atrostyla Debbert, endemic
- Drosera burkeana Planch. indigenous
- Drosera capensis L. endemic
- Drosera cistiflora L. endemic
- Drosera collinsiae N.E.Br. ex Burtt Davy, indigenous
- Drosera cuneifolia L.f. endemic
- Drosera dielsiana Exell & J.R.Laundon, indigenous
- Drosera ericgreenii A.Fleischm. R.P.Gibson & Rivadia, endemic
- Drosera esterhuyseniae (T.M.Salter) Debbert, endemic
- Drosera glabripes (Harv.) Stein, endemic
- Drosera hilaris Cham. & Schltdl. endemic
- Drosera indica L. indigenous
- Drosera madagascariensis DC. indigenous
- Drosera natalensis Diels, indigenous
- Drosera pauciflora Banks ex DC. endemic
- Drosera ramentacea Burch. ex DC. endemic
- Drosera regia Stephens, endemic
- Drosera rubripetala Debbert, endemic
- Drosera slackii Cheek, endemic
- Drosera trinervia Spreng. indigenous
- Drosera venusta Debbert, endemic

== Frankeniaceae ==
Family: Frankeniaceae,

=== Frankenia ===
Genus Frankenia:

- Frankenia densa Pohnert, accepted as Frankenia pulverulenta L.
- Frankenia fruticosa J.C.Manning & Helme, endemic
- Frankenia pulverulenta L. indigenous
- Frankenia repens (P.J.Bergius) Fourc. endemic

=== Nothria ===
Genus Nothria:

- Nothria repens P.J.Bergius, accepted as Frankenia repens (P.J.Bergius) Fourc. indigenous

== Gisekiaceae ==
Family: Gisekiaceae,

=== Gisekia ===
Genus Gisekia:

- Gisekia africana (Lour.) Kuntze, indigenous
  - Gisekia africana (Lour.) Kuntze var. africana, indigenous
  - Gisekia africana (Lour.) Kuntze var. cymosa Adamson, accepted as Gisekia africana (Lour.) Kuntze var. decagyna Hauman, present
  - Gisekia africana (Lour.) Kuntze var. decagyna Hauman, indigenous
  - Gisekia africana (Lour.) Kuntze var. pedunculata (Oliv.) Brenan, indigenous
- Gisekia pharnacioides L. indigenous
  - Gisekia pharnacioides L. var. pharnacioides, indigenous

== Kewaceae ==
Family: Kewaceae,

=== Kewa ===
Genus Kewa:

- Kewa angrae-pequenae (Friedrich) Christenh. indigenous
- Kewa arenicola (Sond.) Christenh. endemic
- Kewa bowkeriana (Sond.) Christenh. indigenous
- Kewa salsoloides (Burch.) Christenh. indigenous
- Kewa trachysperma (Adamson) Christenh. endemic

== Limeaceae ==
Family: Limeaceae,

=== Limeum ===
Genus Limeum:

- Limeum aethiopicum Burm.f. indigenous
  - Limeum aethiopicum Burm.f. subsp. aethiopicum var. aethiopicum, accepted as Limeum aethiopicum Burm.f. var. aethiopicum, present
  - Limeum aethiopicum Burm.f. subsp. aethiopicum var. fluviale, accepted as Limeum aethiopicum Burm.f. var. fluviale (Eckl. & Zeyh.) Friedrich, present
  - Limeum aethiopicum Burm.f. subsp. aethiopicum var. intermedium, accepted as Limeum aethiopicum Burm.f. var. intermedium Friedrich, present
  - Limeum aethiopicum Burm.f. subsp. namaense Friedrich var. lanceolatum, accepted as Limeum aethiopicum Burm.f. var. lanceolatum Friedrich, present
  - Limeum aethiopicum Burm.f. subsp. namaense Friedrich var. namaense, accepted as Limeum aethiopicum Burm.f. var. glabrum Moq. present
  - Limeum aethiopicum Burm.f. var. aethiopicum, endemic
  - Limeum aethiopicum Burm.f. var. fluviale (Eckl. & Zeyh.) Friedrich, indigenous
  - Limeum aethiopicum Burm.f. var. intermedium Friedrich, endemic
  - Limeum aethiopicum Burm.f. var. lanceolatum Friedrich, indigenous
- Limeum africanum L. indigenous
  - Limeum africanum L. subsp. africanum, endemic
  - Limeum africanum L. subsp. canescens (E.Mey. ex Fenzl) Friedrich, endemic
- Limeum arenicolum G.Schellenb. indigenous
- Limeum argute-carinatum Wawra ex Wawra & Peyr. indigenous
  - Limeum argute-carinatum Wawra ex Wawra & Peyr. var. argute-carinatum, indigenous
  - Limeum argute-carinatum Wawra ex Wawra & Peyr. var. kwebense (N.E.Br.) Friedrich, indigenous
- Limeum deserticolum Dinter & G.Schellenb. indigenous
- Limeum dinteri G.Schellenb. indigenous
- Limeum fenestratum (Fenzl) Heimerl var. exalatum Friedrich, indigenous
  - Limeum fenestratum (Fenzl) Heimerl var. fenestratum, indigenous
  - Limeum fenestratum (Fenzl) Heimerl var. frutescens (Dinter) Friedrich, accepted as Limeum fenestratum (Fenzl) Heimerl var. fenestratum
- Limeum humifusum Friedrich, indigenous
- Limeum myosotis H.Walter, indigenous
  - Limeum myosotis H.Walter var. confusum Friedrich, indigenous
  - Limeum myosotis H.Walter var. myosotis, indigenous
- Limeum pauciflorum Moq. endemic
- Limeum pterocarpum (J.Gay) Heimerl, indigenous
  - Limeum pterocarpum (J.Gay) Heimerl var. apterum Friedrich, indigenous
  - Limeum pterocarpum (J.Gay) Heimerl var. pterocarpum, indigenous
- Limeum rhombifolium G.Schellenb. indigenous
- Limeum subnudum Friedrich, endemic
- Limeum sulcatum (Klotzsch) Hutch. indigenous
  - Limeum sulcatum (Klotzsch) Hutch. var. gracile Friedrich, accepted as Limeum sulcatum (Klotzsch) Hutch. var. sulcatum, present
  - Limeum sulcatum (Klotzsch) Hutch. var. robustum Friedrich, accepted as Limeum sulcatum (Klotzsch) Hutch. var. sulcatum, present
  - Limeum sulcatum (Klotzsch) Hutch. var. scabridum (Klotzsch) Friedrich, indigenous
  - Limeum sulcatum (Klotzsch) Hutch. var. sulcatum, indigenous
- Limeum telephioides E.Mey. ex Fenzl, indigenous
  - Limeum telephioides E.Mey. ex Fenzl var. schlechteri (G.Schellenb.) Friedrich, endemic
  - Limeum telephioides E.Mey. ex Fenzl var. telephioides, endemic
- Limeum viscosum (J.Gay) Fenzl, indigenous
  - Limeum viscosum (J.Gay) Fenzl subsp. nummulifolium (H.Walter) Friedrich, indigenous
  - Limeum viscosum (J.Gay) Fenzl subsp. transvaalense Friedrich, endemic
  - Limeum viscosum (J.Gay) Fenzl subsp. viscosum var. dubium, indigenous
  - Limeum viscosum (J.Gay) Fenzl subsp. viscosum var. glomeratum, indigenous
  - Limeum viscosum (J.Gay) Fenzl subsp. viscosum var. kraussii, indigenous
  - Limeum viscosum (J.Gay) Fenzl subsp. viscosum var. macrocarpum, indigenous
  - Limeum viscosum (J.Gay) Fenzl subsp. viscosum var. viscosum, indigenous

== Lophiocarpaceae ==
Family: Lophiocarpaceae,

=== Lophiocarpus ===
Genus Lophiocarpus:

- Lophiocarpus latifolius Nowicke, indigenous
- Lophiocarpus polystachyus Turcz. indigenous
- Lophiocarpus tenuissimus Hook.f. indigenous

== Molluginaceae ==
Family: Molluginaceae,

=== Adenogramma ===
Genus Adenogramma:

- Adenogramma capillaris (Eckl. & Zeyh.) Druce, endemic
- Adenogramma congesta Adamson, endemic
- Adenogramma glomerata (L.f.) Druce, indigenous
- Adenogramma lichtensteiniana (Schult.) Druce, endemic
- Adenogramma littoralis Adamson, endemic
- Adenogramma mollugo Rchb.f. endemic
- Adenogramma natans J.C.Manning & Goldblatt, endemic
- Adenogramma physocalyx Fenzl, endemic
- Adenogramma rigida (Bartl.) Sond. endemic
- Adenogramma sylvatica (Eckl. & Zeyh.) Fenzl, endemic
- Adenogramma teretifolia (Thunb.) Adamson, endemic

=== Coelanthum ===
Genus Coelanthum:

- Coelanthum grandiflorum E.Mey. ex Fenzl, indigenous
- Coelanthum semiquinquefidum (Hook.f.) Druce, endemic
- Coelanthum verticillatum Adamson, endemic

=== Glinus ===
Genus Glinus:

- Glinus bainesii (Oliv.) Pax, indigenous
- Glinus lotoides L. indigenous
  - Glinus lotoides L. var. lotoides, not indigenous, naturalised
  - Glinus lotoides L. var. virens Fenzl, indigenous
- Glinus oppositifolius (L.) Aug.DC. indigenous
  - Glinus oppositifolius (L.) Aug.DC. var. oppositifolius, indigenous
- Glinus trianthemoides B.Heyne, accepted as Corbichonia decumbens (Forssk.) Exell

=== Hypertelis ===
Genus Hypertelis:

- Hypertelis angrae-pequenae Friedrich, accepted as Kewa angrae-pequenae (Friedrich) Christenh. indigenous
- Hypertelis arenicola Sond. accepted as Kewa arenicola (Sond.) Christenh. endemic
- Hypertelis bowkeriana Sond. accepted as Kewa bowkeriana (Sond.) Christenh. indigenous
- Hypertelis caespitosa Friedrich, accepted as Kewa caespitosa (Friedrich) Christenh. indigenous
- Hypertelis cerviana (L.) Thulin, indigenous
- Hypertelis longifolia Gand. accepted as Pharnaceum lineare L.f. indigenous
- Hypertelis salsoloides (Burch.) Adamson, accepted as Kewa salsoloides (Burch.) Christenh. indigenous
- Hypertelis spergulacea E.Mey. ex Fenzl, indigenous
- Hypertelis trachysperma Adamson, accepted as Kewa trachysperma (Adamson) Christenh. endemic
- Hypertelis umbellata (Forssk.) Thulin, indigenous
- Hypertelis verrucosa (Eckl. & Zeyh.) Fenzl, accepted as Kewa salsoloides (Burch.) Christenh. indigenous

=== Mollugo ===
Genus Mollugo:

- Mollugo cerviana (L.) Ser. ex DC. accepted as Hypertelis cerviana (L.) Thulin, indigenous
  - Mollugo cerviana (L.) Ser. ex DC. var. spathulifolia Fenzl, accepted as Hypertelis umbellata (Forssk.) Thulin, indigenous
- Mollugo namaquensis Bolus, accepted as Pharnaceum namaquense (Bolus ex Schltr.) Thulin, endemic
- Mollugo nudicaulis Lam. accepted as Paramollugo nudicaulis (Lam.) Thulin, indigenous
- Mollugo pusilla (Schltr.) Adamson, accepted as Pharnaceum pusillum Schltr. indigenous
- Mollugo spathulifolia (Fenzl) Dinter, accepted as Hypertelis umbellata (Forssk.) Thulin, indigenous
- Mollugo tenella Bolus, accepted as Pharnaceum subtile E.Mey. indigenous
- Mollugo umbellata (Forssk.) Ser. accepted as Hypertelis umbellata (Forssk.) Thulin, indigenous

=== Paramollugo ===
Genus Paramollugo:

- Paramollugo nudicaulis (Lam.) Thulin, indigenous

=== Pharnaceum ===
Genus Pharnaceum:

- Pharnaceum albens L.f. indigenous
- Pharnaceum alpinum Adamson, indigenous
- Pharnaceum aurantium (DC.) Druce, indigenous
- Pharnaceum brevicaule (DC.) Bartl. indigenous
- Pharnaceum cervianum L. accepted as Hypertelis cerviana (L.) Thulin, indigenous
- Pharnaceum ciliare Adamson, endemic
- Pharnaceum confertum (DC.) Eckl. & Zeyh. indigenous
  - Pharnaceum confertum (DC.) Eckl. & Zeyh. var. brachyphyllum Adamson, indigenous
  - Pharnaceum confertum (DC.) Eckl. & Zeyh. var. confertum, indigenous
- Pharnaceum cordifolium L. endemic
- Pharnaceum croceum E.Mey. ex Fenzl, indigenous
- Pharnaceum detonsum Fenzl, indigenous
- Pharnaceum dichotomum L.f. indigenous
- Pharnaceum elongatum (DC.) Adamson, endemic
- Pharnaceum exiguum Adamson, indigenous
- Pharnaceum fluviale Eckl. & Zeyh. endemic
- Pharnaceum incanum L. endemic
- Pharnaceum lanatum Bartl. endemic
- Pharnaceum lanuginosum J.C.Manning & Goldblatt, endemic
- Pharnaceum lineare L.f. endemic
- Pharnaceum microphyllum L.f. endemic
  - Pharnaceum microphyllum L.f. var. albens Adamson, accepted as Pharnaceum lanuginosum J.C.Manning & Goldblatt, present
  - Pharnaceum microphyllum L.f. var. microphyllum, indigenous
- Pharnaceum namaquense (Bolus ex Schltr.) Thulin, endemic
- Pharnaceum pusillum Schltr. indigenous
- Pharnaceum quadrangulare L.f. accepted as Psammotropha quadrangularis (L.f.) Fenzl var. quadrangularis, present
- Pharnaceum rubens Adamson, endemic
- Pharnaceum scleranthoides Sond. accepted as Suessenguthiella scleranthoides (Sond.) Friedrich, indigenous
- Pharnaceum serpyllifolium L.f. endemic
- Pharnaceum subtile E.Mey. indigenous
- Pharnaceum thunbergii Adamson, endemic
- Pharnaceum trigonum Eckl. & Zeyh. indigenous
- Pharnaceum umbellatum Forssk. accepted as Hypertelis umbellata (Forssk.) Thulin, indigenous
- Pharnaceum verrucosum Eckl. & Zeyh. accepted as Kewa salsoloides (Burch.) Christenh. indigenous
- Pharnaceum viride Adamson, endemic

=== Polpoda ===
Genus Polpoda:

- Polpoda capensis C.Presl, endemic
- Polpoda stipulacea (F.M.Leight.) Adamson, endemic

=== Psammotropha ===
Genus Psammotropha:

- Psammotropha alternifolia Killick, indigenous
- Psammotropha anguina Compton, endemic
- Psammotropha breviscapa Burtt Davy, accepted as Psammotropha myriantha Sond. indigenous
- Psammotropha diffusa Adamson, endemic
- Psammotropha frigida Schltr. endemic
- Psammotropha marginata (Thunb.) Druce, indigenous
- Psammotropha mucronata (Thunb.) Fenzl, indigenous
  - Psammotropha mucronata (Thunb.) Fenzl var. foliosa Adamson, indigenous
  - Psammotropha mucronata (Thunb.) Fenzl var. marginata Adamson, indigenous
  - Psammotropha mucronata (Thunb.) Fenzl var. mucronata, indigenous
- Psammotropha myriantha Sond. indigenous
- Psammotropha obovata Adamson, indigenous
- Psammotropha obtusa Adamson, indigenous
- Psammotropha quadrangularis (L.f.) Fenzl, endemic
  - Psammotropha quadrangularis (L.f.) Fenzl var. calcarata Compton, endemic
  - Psammotropha quadrangularis (L.f.) Fenzl var. quadrangularis, endemic
- Psammotropha spicata Adamson, endemic
- Psammotropha stipulacea F.M.Leight. accepted as Polpoda stipulacea (F.M.Leight.) Adamson, indigenous

=== Suessenguthiella ===
Genus Suessenguthiella:

- Suessenguthiella caespitosa Friedrich, accepted as Suessenguthiella scleranthoides (Sond.) Friedrich
- Suessenguthiella scleranthoides (Sond.) Friedrich, indigenous

== Nyctaginaceae ==
Family: Nyctaginaceae,

=== Boerhavia ===
Genus Boerhavia:

- Boerhavia coccinea Mill. indigenous
  - Boerhavia coccinea Mill. var. coccinea, indigenous
- Boerhavia cordobensis Kuntze, not indigenous, naturalised
- Boerhavia diffusa L. var. diffusa, not indigenous, naturalised
- Boerhavia erecta L. not indigenous, naturalised
- Boerhavia hereroensis Heimerl, indigenous
- Boerhavia repens L. indigenous
  - Boerhavia repens L. subsp. repens, indigenous

=== Bougainvillea ===
Genus Bougainvillea:

- Bougainvillea glabra Choisy, not indigenous, naturalised, invasive

=== Commicarpus ===
Genus Commicarpus:

- Commicarpus chinensis (L.) Heimerl, indigenous
  - Commicarpus chinensis (L.) Heimerl subsp. natalensis Meikle, indigenous
- Commicarpus decipiens Meikle, indigenous
- Commicarpus helenae (Roem. & Schult.) Meikle, indigenous
  - Commicarpus helenae (Roem. & Schult.) Meikle var. helenae, indigenous
- Commicarpus pentandrus (Burch.) Heimerl, indigenous
- Commicarpus pilosus (Heimerl) Meikle, indigenous
- Commicarpus plumbagineus (Cav.) Standl. indigenous
  - Commicarpus plumbagineus (Cav.) Standl. var. plumbagineus, indigenous

=== Mirabilis ===
Genus Mirabilis:

- Mirabilis jalapa L. not indigenous, naturalised, invasive

=== Phaeoptilum ===
Genus Phaeoptilum:

- Phaeoptilum spinosum Radlk. indigenous

=== Pisonia ===
Genus Pisonia:

- Pisonia aculeata L. indigenous

== Phytolaccaceae ==
Family: Phytolaccaceae,

=== Hilleria ===
Genus Hilleria:

- Hilleria latifolia (Lam.) H.Walter, indigenous

=== Petiveria ===
Genus Petiveria:

- Petiveria alliacea L. not indigenous, naturalised, invasive

=== Phytolacca ===
Genus Phytolacca :

- Phytolacca americana L. not indigenous, naturalised, invasive
- Phytolacca dioica L. not indigenous, naturalised, invasive
- Phytolacca dodecandra L'Her. indigenous
- Phytolacca heptandra Retz. indigenous
- Phytolacca octandra L. not indigenous, naturalised, invasive

=== Rivina ===
Genus Rivina:

- Rivina humilis L. not indigenous, naturalised, invasive

== Plumbaginaceae ==
Family: Plumbaginaceae,

=== Afrolimon ===
Genus Afrolimon:

- Afrolimon amoenum (C.H.Wright) Lincz. accepted as Limonium amoenum (C.H.Wright) R.A.Dyer, endemic
- Afrolimon capense (L.Bolus) Lincz. accepted as Limonium capense (L.Bolus) L.Bolus, endemic
- Afrolimon longifolium (Thunb.) Lincz. accepted as Limonium longifolium (Thunb.) R.A.Dyer, endemic
- Afrolimon namaquanum (L.Bolus) Lincz. accepted as Limonium namaquanum L.Bolus, endemic
- Afrolimon peregrinum (P.J.Bergius) Lincz. accepted as Limonium peregrinum (P.J.Bergius) R.A.Dyer, endemic
- Afrolimon purpuratum (L.) Lincz. accepted as Limonium purpuratum (L.) F.T.Hubb. ex L.H.Bailey, endemic
- Afrolimon teretifolium (L.) Lincz. accepted as Limonium teretifolium L.Bolus, endemic

=== Dyerophytum ===
Genus Dyerophytum:

- Dyerophytum africanum (Lam.) Kuntze, indigenous

=== Limonium ===
Genus Limonium:

- Limonium acuminatum L.Bolus, endemic
- Limonium amoenum (C.H.Wright) R.A.Dyer, endemic
- Limonium anthericoides (Schltr.) R.A.Dyer, endemic
- Limonium capense (L.Bolus) L.Bolus, endemic
- Limonium decumbens (Boiss.) Kuntze, endemic
- Limonium depauperatum (Boiss.) R.A.Dyer, endemic
- Limonium dregeanum (C.Presl) Kuntze, indigenous
- Limonium equisetinum (Boiss.) R.A.Dyer, endemic
- Limonium kraussianum (Buchinger ex Boiss.) Kuntze, endemic
- Limonium linifolium (L.f.) Kuntze, indigenous
  - Limonium linifolium (L.f.) Kuntze var. linifolium, endemic
  - Limonium linifolium (L.f.) Kuntze var. maritimum (Eckl. & Zeyh. ex Boiss.) R.A.Dyer, endemic
- Limonium longifolium (Thunb.) R.A.Dyer, endemic
- Limonium membranaceum R.A.Dyer, accepted as Limonium dyeri Lincz.
- Limonium namaquanum L.Bolus, endemic
- Limonium peregrinum (P.J.Bergius) R.A.Dyer, endemic
- Limonium perezii (Stapf) F.T.Hubb. not indigenous; cult, naturalised
- Limonium purpuratum (L.) F.T.Hubb. ex L.H.Bailey, endemic
- Limonium scabrum (Thunb.) Kuntze, indigenous
  - Limonium scabrum (Thunb.) Kuntze var. avenaceum (C.H.Wright) R.A.Dyer, endemic
  - Limonium scabrum (Thunb.) Kuntze var. corymbulosum (Boiss.) R.A.Dyer, endemic
  - Limonium scabrum (Thunb.) Kuntze var. scabrum, indigenous
- Limonium sinuatum (L.) Mill. not indigenous; cult, naturalised, invasive
  - Limonium sinuatum (L.) Mill. subsp. sinuatum, not indigenous; cult, naturalised, invasive
- Limonium teretifolium L.Bolus, endemic

=== Plumbago ===
Genus Plumbago:

- Plumbago auriculata Lam. indigenous
- Plumbago tristis Aiton, endemic
- Plumbago zeylanica L. not indigenous, naturalised

== Polygonaceae ==
Family: Polygonaceae,

=== Antigonon ===
Genus Antigonon:

- Antigonon leptopus Hook. & Arn. not indigenous, naturalised, invasive

=== Emex ===
Genus Emex:

- Emex australis Steinh. indigenous
- Emex podocentrum Meisn. accepted as Emex australis Steinh. present

=== Fagopyrum ===
Genus Fagopyrum:

- Fagopyrum esculentum Moench, not indigenous, naturalised

=== Fallopia ===
Genus Fallopia:

- Fallopia convolvulus (L.) Holub, not indigenous, naturalised
- Fallopia sachalinensis (F.Schmidt) Ronse Decr. accepted as Reynoutria sachalinensis (F.Schmidt) Nakai, not indigenous, naturalised, invasive

=== Oxygonum ===
Genus Oxygonum:

- Oxygonum alatum Burch. indigenous
  - Oxygonum alatum Burch. var. alatum, indigenous
- Oxygonum delagoense Kuntze, indigenous
- Oxygonum dregeanum Meisn. indigenous
  - Oxygonum dregeanum Meisn. subsp. canescens (Sond.) Germish. var. canescens, indigenous
  - Oxygonum dregeanum Meisn. subsp. canescens (Sond.) Germish. var. dissectum, endemic
  - Oxygonum dregeanum Meisn. subsp. canescens (Sond.) Germish. var. linearifolium, endemic
  - Oxygonum dregeanum Meisn. subsp. canescens (Sond.) Germish. var. lobophyllum, indigenous
  - Oxygonum dregeanum Meisn. subsp. canescens (Sond.) Germish. var. pilosum, endemic
  - Oxygonum dregeanum Meisn. subsp. dregeanum, endemic
  - Oxygonum dregeanum Meisn. subsp. lanceolatum Germish. indigenous
  - Oxygonum dregeanum Meisn. subsp. streyi Germish. endemic
  - Oxygonum dregeanum Meisn. subsp. swazicum (Burtt Davy) Germish. indigenous
- Oxygonum robustum Germish. indigenous
- Oxygonum sinuatum (Hochst. & Steud. ex Meisn.) Dammer, indigenous

=== Persicaria ===
Genus Persicaria:

- Persicaria amphibia (L.) Gray, not indigenous, naturalised
- Persicaria attenuata (R.Br.) Sojak subsp. africana K.L.Wilson, accepted as Persicaria madagascariensis (Meisn.) S.Ortiz & Paiva, indigenous
- Persicaria capitata (Buch.-Ham. ex D.Don) H.Gross, not indigenous, naturalised, invasive
- Persicaria decipiens (R.Br.) K.L.Wilson, indigenous
- Persicaria hydropiper (L.) Spach, not indigenous, naturalised
- Persicaria hystricula (J.Schust.) Sojak, indigenous
- Persicaria lapathifolia (L.) Gray, not indigenous, naturalised
- Persicaria madagascariensis (Meisn.) S.Ortiz & Paiva, indigenous
- Persicaria meisneriana (Cham. & Schltdl.) M.Gomez, indigenous
- Persicaria nepalensis (Meisn.) H.Gross, not indigenous, naturalised
- Persicaria senegalensis (Meisn.) Sojak, indigenous
  - Persicaria senegalensis (Meisn.) Sojak forma albotomentosa (R.A.Graham) K.L.Wilson, indigenous
  - Persicaria senegalensis (Meisn.) Sojak forma senegalensis, indigenous
- Persicaria serrulata (Lag.) Webb & Moq. accepted as Persicaria decipiens (R.Br.) K.L.Wilson, present
- Persicaria wallichii Greuter & Burdet, not indigenous, cultivated, naturalised

=== Polygonum ===
Genus Polygonum:

- Polygonum aviculare L. not indigenous, naturalised
- Polygonum bellardii All. not indigenous, naturalised
- Polygonum hystriculum J.Schust. accepted as Persicaria hystricula (J.Schust.) Sojak, present
- Polygonum kitaibelianum Sadler, accepted as Polygonum bellardii All. not indigenous, naturalised
- Polygonum maritimum L. not indigenous, naturalised
- Polygonum meisnerianum Cham. & Schltdl. accepted as Persicaria meisneriana (Cham. & Schltdl.) M.Gomez, present
- Polygonum plebeium R.Br. indigenous
- Polygonum poiretii Meisn. var. madagascariensis Meisn. accepted as Persicaria madagascariensis (Meisn.) S.Ortiz & Paiva, indigenous
- Polygonum snijmaniae S.Ortiz, endemic
- Polygonum undulatum (L.) P.J.Bergius, endemic

=== Reynoutria ===
Genus Reynoutria:

- Reynoutria sachalinensis (F.Schmidt) Nakai, not indigenous, naturalised, invasive

=== Rumex ===
Genus Rumex:

- Rumex acetosella L. subsp. angiocarpus (Murb.) Murb. not indigenous, naturalised
- Rumex bequaertii De Wild. indigenous
- Rumex brownii Campd. not indigenous, naturalised
- Rumex conglomeratus Murb. indigenous
- Rumex cordatus Poir. indigenous
- Rumex crispus L. not indigenous, naturalised, invasive
- Rumex dregeanus Meisn. indigenous
  - Rumex dregeanus Meisn. subsp. dregeanus, endemic
  - Rumex dregeanus Meisn. subsp. montanus B.L.Burtt, indigenous
- Rumex lanceolatus Thunb. indigenous
- Rumex lativalvis Meisn. endemic
- Rumex nepalensis Spreng. not indigenous, naturalised
- Rumex obtusifolius L. subsp. obtusifolius, indigenous
- Rumex pulcher L. not indigenous, naturalised
  - Rumex pulcher L. subsp. divaricatus (L.) Murb. not indigenous, naturalised
- Rumex rhodesius Rech.f. indigenous
- Rumex sagittatus Thunb. indigenous
- Rumex spathulatus Thunb. endemic
- Rumex steudelii Hochst. ex A.Rich. indigenous
- Rumex usambarensis (Dammer) Dammer, not indigenous, naturalised, invasive
- Rumex woodii N.E.Br. indigenous

=== Triplaris ===
Genus Triplaris:

- Triplaris americana L. not indigenous, naturalised, invasive

== Portulacaceae ==
Family: Portulacaceae,

=== Calandrinia ===
Genus Calandrinia:

- Calandrinia ciliata (Ruiz & Pav.) DC. not indigenous, naturalised

=== Claytonia ===
Genus Claytonia:

- Claytonia portulacaria (L.) L. accepted as Portulacaria afra Jacq. indigenous

=== Portulaca ===
Genus Portulaca:

- Portulaca collina Dinter, indigenous
- Portulaca decumbens (Forssk.) Vahl, accepted as Corbichonia decumbens (Forssk.) Exell, indigenous
- Portulaca foliosa Ker Gawl. indigenous
- Portulaca fruticosa Thunb. accepted as Portulacaria afra Jacq. indigenous
- Portulaca grandiflora Hook. endemic
- Portulaca hereroensis Schinz, indigenous
- Portulaca kermesina N.E.Br. indigenous
- Portulaca oleracea L. not indigenous, naturalised
- Portulaca pilosa L. indigenous
- Portulaca quadrifida L. indigenous
- Portulaca rhodesiana R.A.Dyer & E.A.Bruce, indigenous
- Portulaca trianthemoides Bremek. endemic

== Tamaricaceae ==
Family: Tamaricaceae,

=== Tamarix ===
Genus Tamarix:

- Tamarix angolensis Nied. accepted as Tamarix usneoides E.Mey. ex Bunge
- Tamarix chinensis Lour. not indigenous, naturalised, invasive
- Tamarix ramosissima Ledeb. not indigenous, naturalised, invasive
- Tamarix usneoides E.Mey. ex Bunge, indigenous
