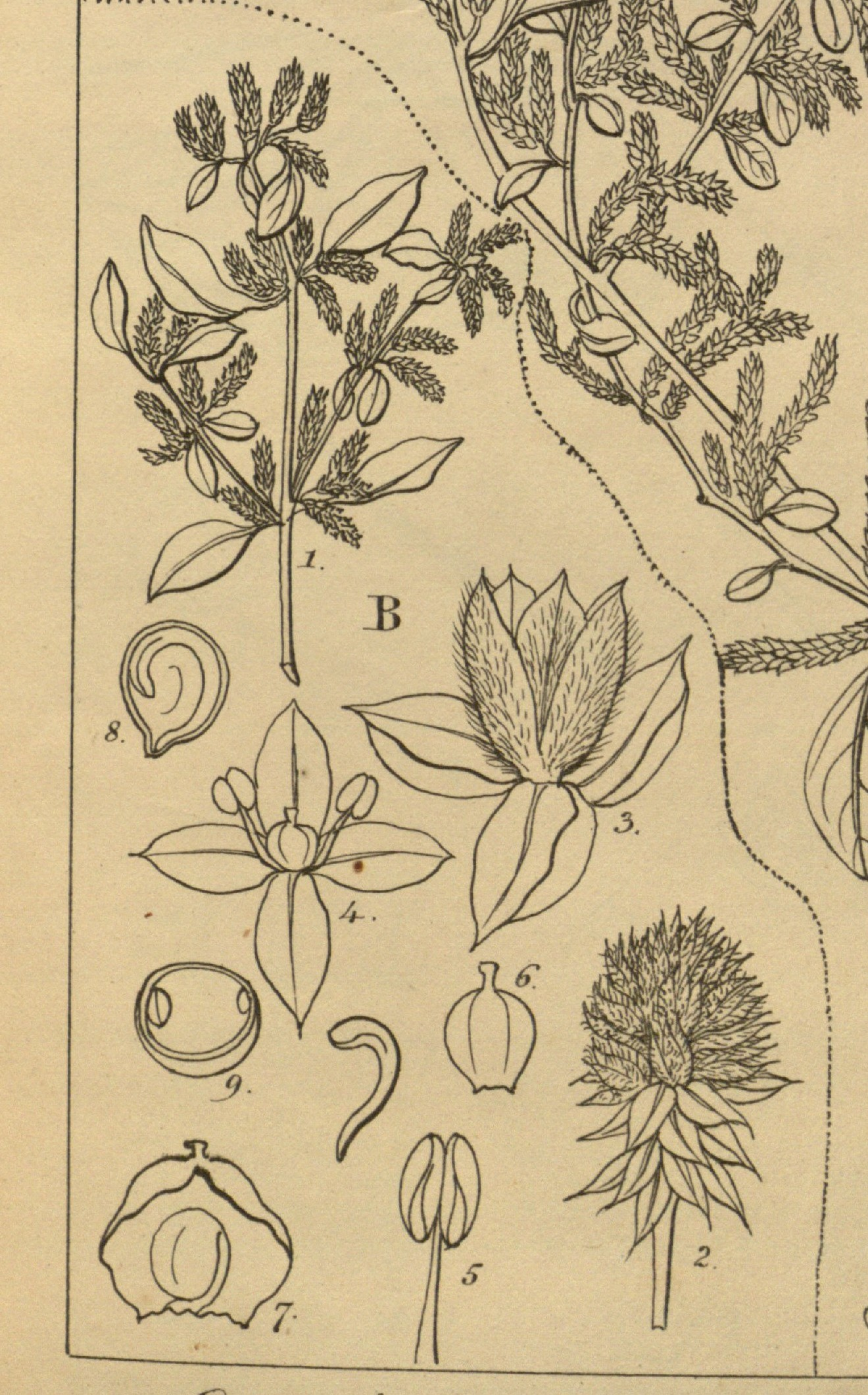

Scientific classification
- Kingdom: Plantae
- Clade: Tracheophytes
- Clade: Angiosperms
- Clade: Eudicots
- Order: Caryophyllales
- Family: Amaranthaceae
- Subfamily: Amaranthoideae
- Genus: Nothosaerva; Wight
- Species: N. brachiata

Binomial name
- Nothosaerva brachiata (L.) Wight

Synonyms
- Pseudanthus Wight 1852, illegitimate homonym, not Pseudanthus Sieber ex A. Spreng. 1827 (Picrodendraceae); Achyranthes brachiata L.; Aerva brachiata (L.) Mart.; Aerva chenopodiifolia Bojer; Amaranthus minutus Lesch. ex Moq.; Illecebrum brachiatum (L.) L.; Pseudanthus brachiatus (L.) Wight

= Nothosaerva =

Genus of flowering plants

Nothosaerva is a monotypic genus of flowering plants in the family Amaranthaceae containing the single species Nothosaerva brachiata. It is native to India, Sri Lanka, Southeast Asia, and eastern Africa.

This species was first described in 1852 with the name Pseudanthus. This turned out to be an illegitimate homonym, so it was renamed Nothosaerva in 1853.
