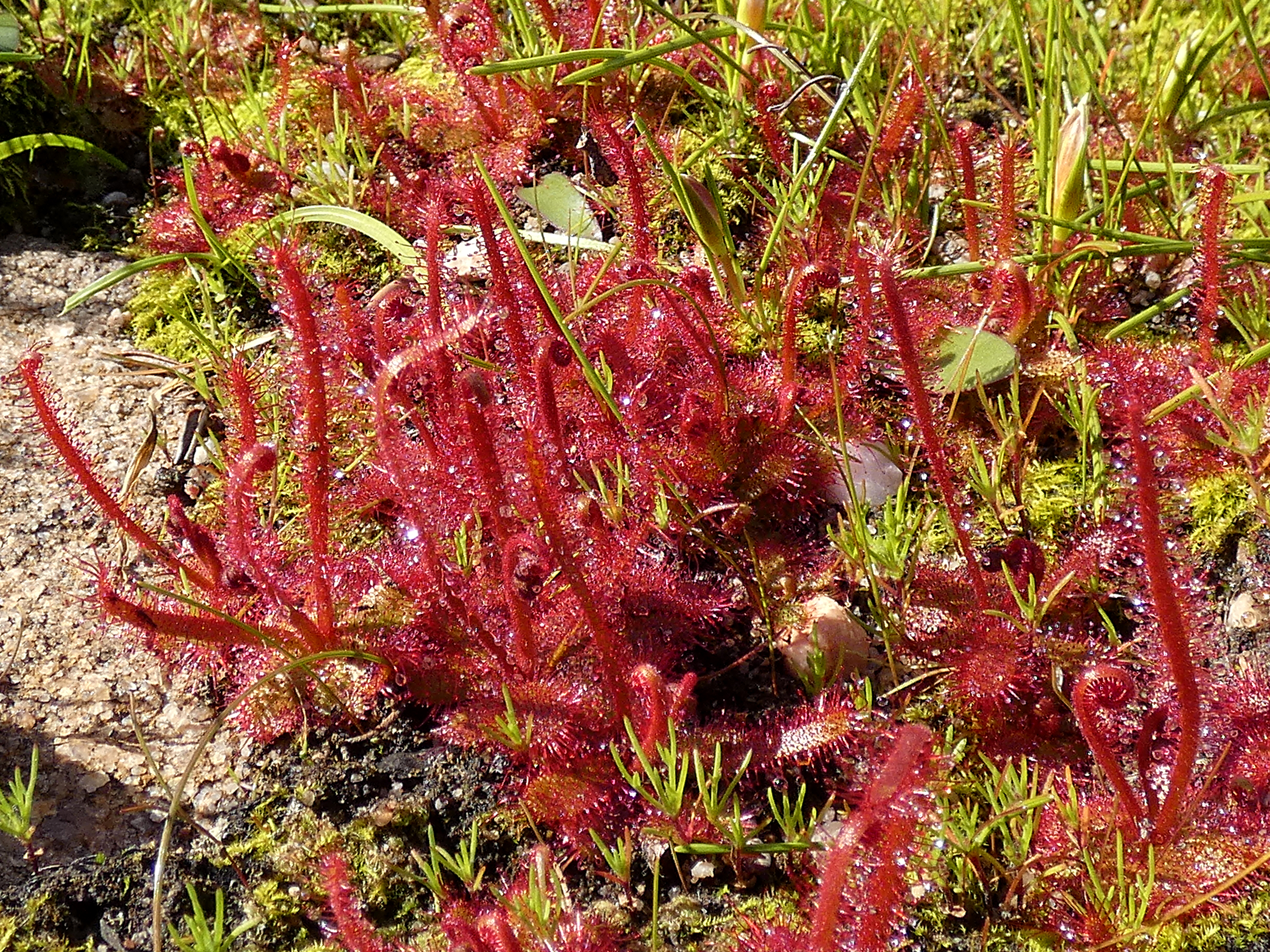

Scientific classification
- Kingdom: Plantae
- Clade: Tracheophytes
- Clade: Angiosperms
- Clade: Eudicots
- Order: Caryophyllales
- Family: Droseraceae
- Genus: Drosera
- Subgenus: Drosera subg. Drosera
- Section: Drosera sect. Drosera
- Species: D. alba

Binomial name
- Drosera alba E.Phillips (1913)

= Drosera alba =

Endemic plant species

Drosera alba, the white sundew, is a species of carnivorous plant in the family Droseraceae. It is endemic to South Africa.

Drosera alba is not to be confused with anthocyanin-free forms of Drosera capensis which are sometimes referred to by growers as "Alba". These are correctly referred to by the registered cultivar name 'Albino'.

== Description ==
Although the plant itself is red, its flowers (for which the species is named) are white. It is a winter-growing sundew that enters dormancy during a dry summer season.

== Distribution ==
Drosera alba is native to the south-west Cape region of South Africa.
