= Dianthus micropetalus =

Scientific classification
- Kingdom: Plantae
- Clade: Tracheophytes
- Clade: Angiosperms
- Clade: Eudicots
- Order: Caryophyllales
- Family: Caryophyllaceae
- Genus: Dianthus
- Species: D. micropetalus

Binomial name
- Dianthus micropetalus Ser

Species of flowering plant

Dianthus micropetalus (Grassveld pink) is a species of flowering plant in the family Caryophyllaceae.

It is indigenous to the dry grassland and karoo terrain in the central and northwestern parts of South Africa, from near Cradock in the south east, to Namibia in the north west. It is recorded from Griekwastad, Windsorton, and Colesberg.

== Description ==
Dianthus micropetalus can be distinguished by its very minute petals (due to them being very shortly exserted, by only 2.5 to 10mm). The petals are toothed or narrowly fimbriate. The flower stems can be either simple or branched.

The basal leaves are short (5-15mm long usually, max 4mm in rare cases).
