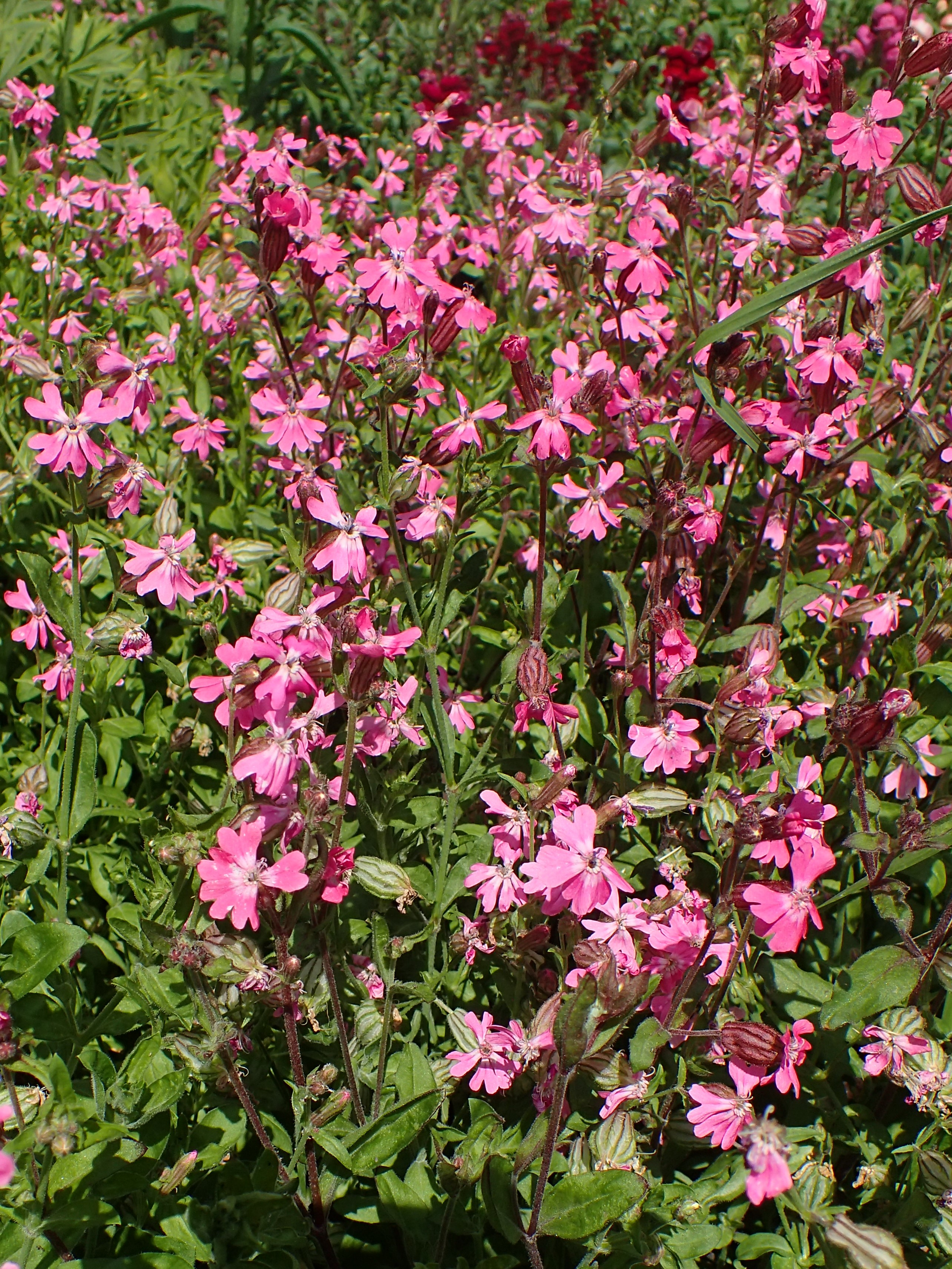
- 'Compacta' cultivar
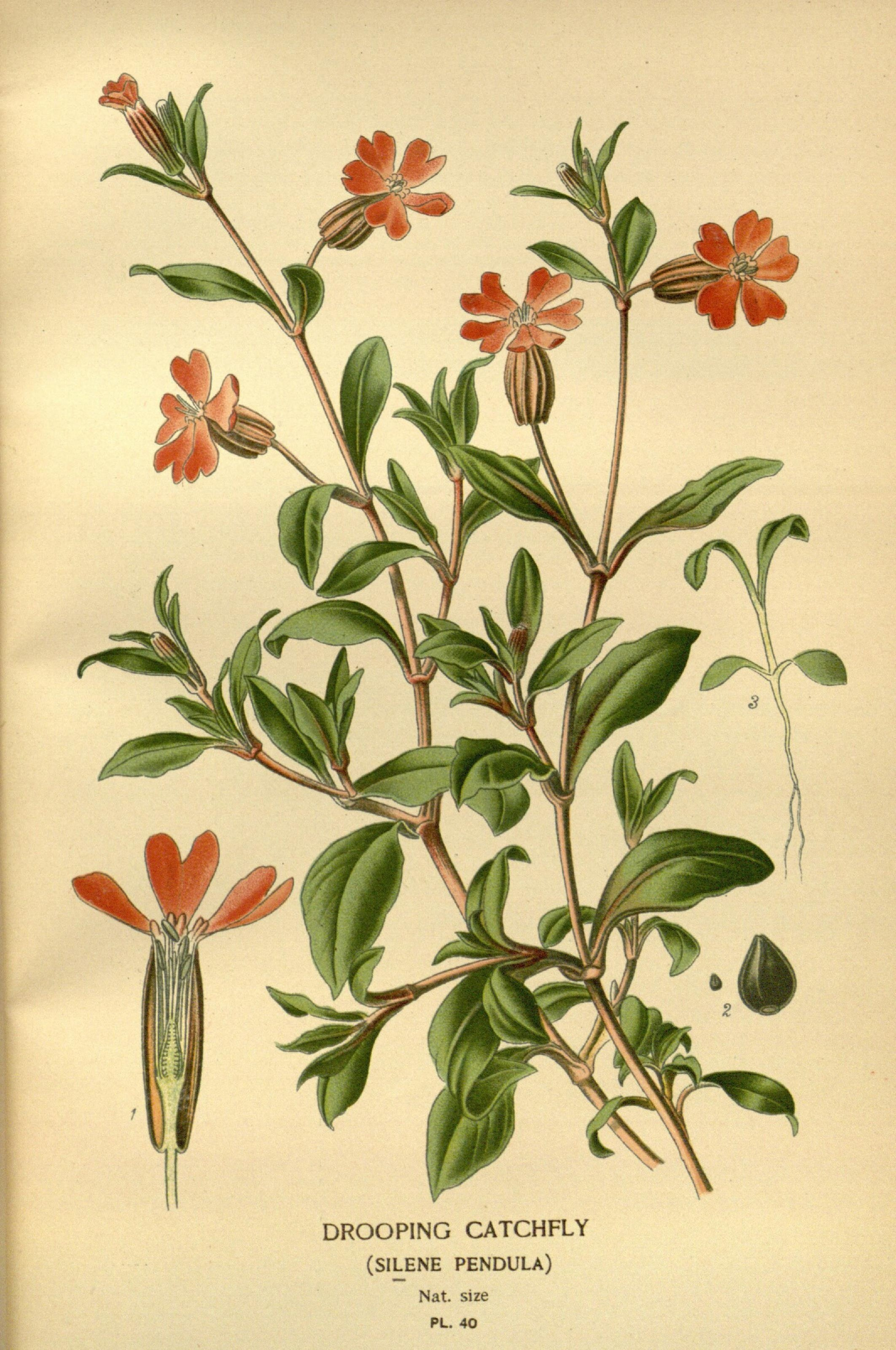
- Botanical illustration

Scientific classification
- Kingdom: Plantae
- Clade: Embryophytes
- Clade: Tracheophytes
- Clade: Angiosperms
- Clade: Eudicots
- Order: Caryophyllales
- Family: Caryophyllaceae
- Genus: Silene
- Species: S. pendula

Binomial name
- Silene pendula L.

Synonyms
- Silene cisplatensis Cambess.; Silene crispa Moench

= Silene pendula =

Species of flowering plant

Silene pendula, called the nodding catchfly or drooping catchfly, is a species of flowering plant in the genus Silene, native to Italy, Greece, and Turkey, and introduced to scattered locations in North America, South America, Africa, Europe and Asia. A number of cultivars are available. A 2020 study showed with certainty that, despite their morphological similarities, Silene cisplatensis is not synonymous with Silene pendula.
