= Drosanthemopsis =

Scientific classification
- Kingdom: Plantae
- Clade: Tracheophytes
- Clade: Angiosperms
- Clade: Eudicots
- Order: Caryophyllales
- Family: Aizoaceae
- Genus: Drosanthemopsis; Rauschert

Genus of plants

Drosanthemopsis is a genus of flowering plants belonging to the family Aizoaceae.

Its native range is South African Republic.

Species:

- Drosanthemopsis bella Klak
- Drosanthemopsis diversifolia (L.Bolus) Klak
- Drosanthemopsis kwaganapensis Klak
- Drosanthemopsis vaginata (L.Bolus) Rauschert
