= Calamophyllum =

Scientific classification
- Kingdom: Plantae
- Clade: Tracheophytes
- Clade: Angiosperms
- Clade: Eudicots
- Order: Caryophyllales
- Family: Aizoaceae
- Genus: Calamophyllum; Schwantes

Genus of flowering plants

Calamophyllum is a genus of flowering plants belonging to the family Aizoaceae.

Its native range is South African Republic.

Species:

- Calamophyllum cylindricum (Haw.) Schwantes
- Calamophyllum teretifolium (Haw.) Schwantes
- Calamophyllum teretiusculum (Haw.) Schwantes
