= Silene burchellii =

Scientific classification
- Kingdom: Plantae
- Clade: Tracheophytes
- Clade: Angiosperms
- Clade: Eudicots
- Order: Caryophyllales
- Family: Caryophyllaceae
- Genus: Silene
- Species: S. burchellii

Binomial name
- Silene burchellii Otth

Species of flowering plant

Silene burchellii is a herbaceous flowering plant in the family Caryophyllaceae.

It was first described by Swedish naturalist, Carl Adolf Otth in 1824, and was named after William John Burchell, who written about the species describing its habitat and habit in Travels in the Interior of Southern Africa. The species is commonly known as the gunpowder plant.

It is native to southern and eastern parts of Africa and the Arabian Peninsula.

== Subspecies ==
The species has the following subspecies:

- Silene burchellii subsp. burchellii
- Silene burchellii subsp. modesta
- Silene burchellii subsp. multiflora
- Silene burchellii subsp. pilosellifolia
