= Persicaria meisneriana =

Scientific classification
- Kingdom: Plantae
- Clade: Tracheophytes
- Clade: Angiosperms
- Clade: Eudicots
- Order: Caryophyllales
- Family: Polygonaceae
- Genus: Persicaria
- Species: P. meisneriana

Binomial name
- Persicaria meisneriana (Cham. & Schltdl.) M.Gómez

Species of plant

Persicaria meisneriana is a flowering plant species in the family Polygonaceae. It was first described by Adelbert von Chamisso and Diederich Franz Leonhard von Schlechtendal, and given its precise name by Gomez de la Maza.

Persicaria meisneriana belongs to the genus Persicaria and the family Polygonaceae.

This species is distributed in:

- Democratic Republic of the Congo
- Democratic Republic of the Congo
- Rwanda
- possibly Burundi
- Uganda
- Tanzania
- Malawi
- South Africa
- Limpopo (province of South Africa)
- Gauteng
- Mpumalanga (province)
- Free State
- Province of KwaZulu-Natal
- Eastern Cape
- Eswatini
- Botswana
- Madagascar

One subspecies belonging to this species is *P. m. beyrichiana*.
