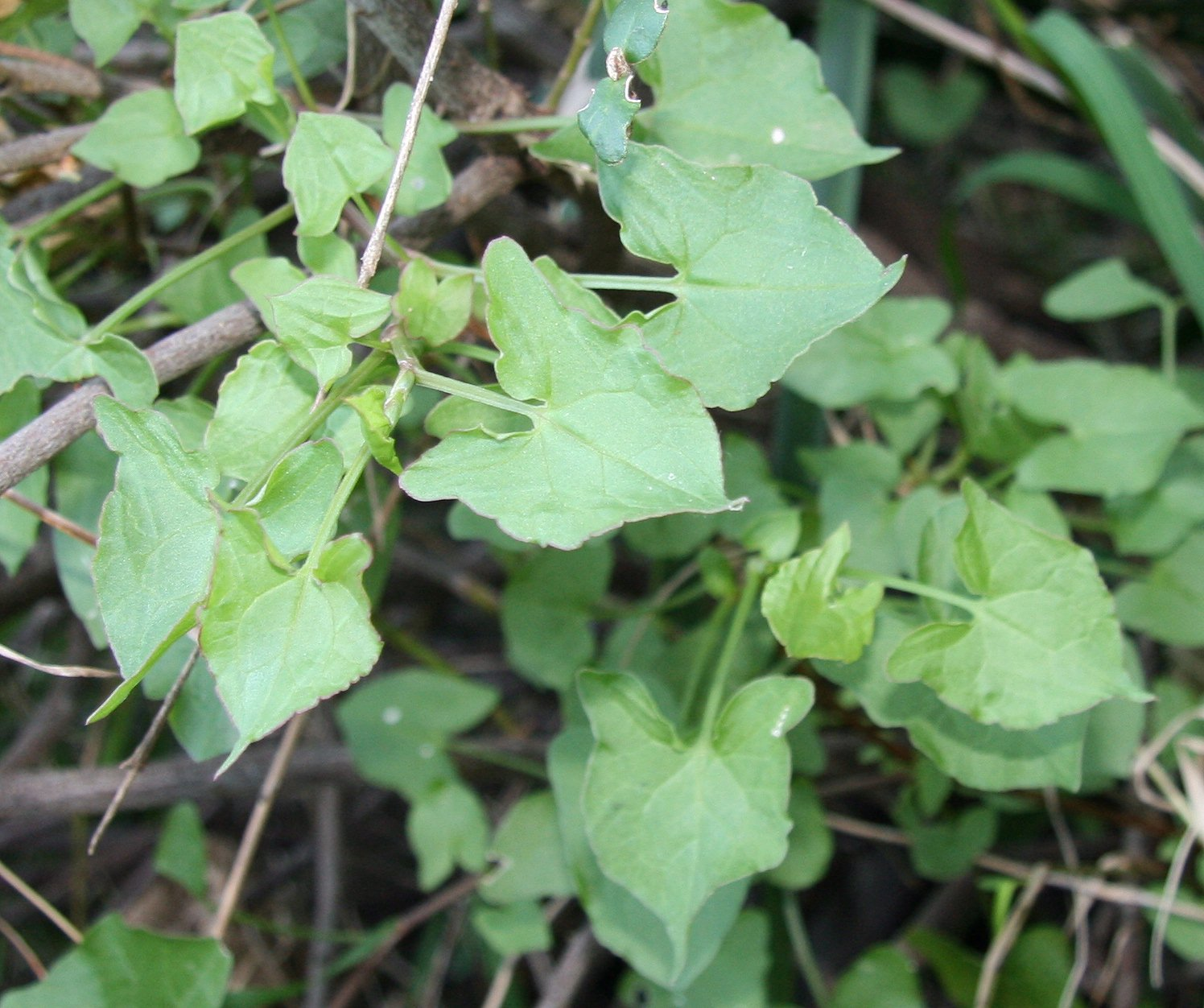
- Characteristic arrow-shaped leaves

Scientific classification
- Kingdom: Plantae
- Clade: Tracheophytes
- Clade: Angiosperms
- Clade: Eudicots
- Order: Caryophyllales
- Family: Polygonaceae
- Genus: Rumex
- Species: R. sagittatus

Binomial name
- Rumex sagittatus Thunb.

Synonyms
- Acetosa luxurians (L.) Chaz.; Acetosa sagittata (Thunb.) L.A.S.Johnson & B.G.Briggs; Eutralia luxurians (L.) Raf.; Rumex burchellii Campd.; Rumex luxurians L.; Rumex pseudoscutatus Dinter; Rumex scandens Burch.

= Rumex sagittatus =

Species of flowering plant

Rumex sagittatus, synonym Acetosa sagittata, commonly known as turkey rhubarb or rambling dock or potato vine, is a herbaceous perennial plant native to southern Africa, which has become a weed in Australia and New Zealand.

== Description ==
Rumex sagittatus is a soft-stemmed herbaceous scrambling and climbing plant with prominent triangular arrow-shaped leaves 3–6 cm (1.2–2.4 in) in length and 2–4 cm (0.8–1.6 in) wide. The grooved green stem may be distinctly tinted red at times. The small pinkish flowers grow on panicles up to 15 cm (6 in) long. These are followed by a 3-sided greenish 0.8–1 cm diameter pod. The plant grows from a tuber, which may be up to 10 cm (4 in) long. The plant flowers and sets seed over summer, and may die back to the tuber in colder areas.

== Taxonomy ==
Rumex sagittatus was first described in 1794 by Swedish botanist Carl Peter Thunberg. It was later placed in the genus Acetosa by Australian botanists Lawrie Johnson and Barbara Briggs, a placement not accepted by other sources, such as Plants of the World Online. Its specific epithet is derived from the Latin sagittus "arrow", hence "arrow-shaped". The plant is known by various common names including turkey rhubarb, arrowhead vine, potato vine, rambling dock or climbing sorrel.

== Distribution and habitat ==
The plant is native to southern Africa, where it occurs from Malawi and Zambia south to South Africa. It has become naturalised in many parts of Australia near urban areas, from Queensland to eastern Tasmania, and warmer locales in New Zealand.

It spreads by seed or by resprouting from the tuber. The seeds float on water and hence may be conveyed far from the parent plant. Tubers may be broken up by tractors or road graders and each fragment may be able to regrow; they can also be difficult to find with removal of plants by hand. Rumex sagittatus may grow and smother other plants it covers.

== Uses ==
The leaves and young stems can be cooked and eaten and are sometimes cultivated as a vegetable in Java.
