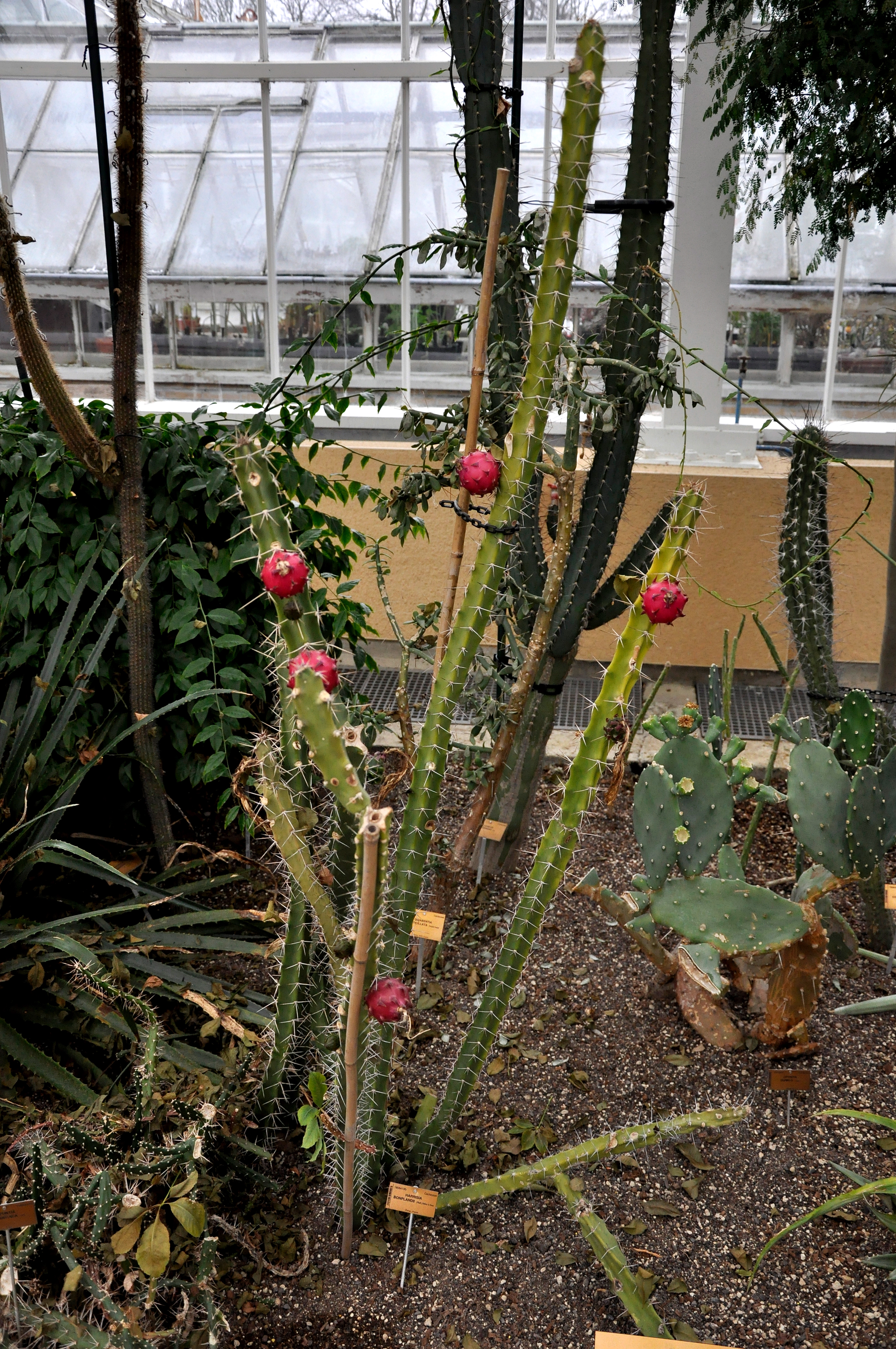

Scientific classification
- Kingdom: Plantae
- Clade: Tracheophytes
- Clade: Angiosperms
- Clade: Eudicots
- Order: Caryophyllales
- Family: Cactaceae
- Subfamily: Cactoideae
- Genus: Harrisia
- Species: H. bonplandii

Binomial name
- Harrisia bonplandii (Parm.) Britton & Rose

Synonyms
- Cereus bonplandii J.Parm. 1837; Eriocereus bonplandii (J.Parm. ex Pfeiff.) Riccob. 1909; Harrisia pomanensis subsp. bonplandii (J.Parm. ex Pfeiff.) P.J.Braun & Esteves 1995; Acanthocereus acutangulus (Pfeiff.) A.Berger 1929; Cereus acutangulus Pfeiff. 1837; Cereus balansae K.Schum. 1890; Cereus bonplandii var. brevispinus C.A.Maass 1905; Cereus bonplandii var. pomanensis F.A.C.Weber 1897; Cereus guelichii Speg. 1905; Cereus pomanensis var. grossei Graebener 1909; Echinopsis balansae (K.Schum.) Anceschi & Magli 2013; Eriocereus guelichii (Speg.) A.Berger 1929; Harrisia balansae (K.Schum.) N.P.Taylor & Zappi 1997; Harrisia guelichii (Speg.) Britton & Rose 1920

= Harrisia bonplandii =

Species of cactus

Harrisia bonplandii is a species of cactus. The cactus plants in the Gran Chaco (Paraguay, Argentina, Bolivia) are generally called tuna and this specific variety reina de la noche (queen of the night). Fruits and roots are edible and well known to the native nations of the Gran Chaco.

Names of this cactus in the different languages of the native Nations are: Ayoreo Nation: daturirai / datura; Enxet Nation: laapang; Nivaclé Nation: sôtôyuc. In Argentina it is also known as pasacana/ulua. The plant remains often unnoticed in the forest, but can not be overseen when it blossoms only in the night and where its Spanish name originates. In English, it's also called the giant red dragon apple cactus or strangler prickly apple.

The name bonplandii honors the French scientist Aimé Bonpland.

== Description ==
Harrisia bonplandii is stem scandent, clambering or sprawling and grows up leaning-climbing. The stems have diameters of up to 5 centimeters and are up to 2.5 meters long. They are three to four edged with flat faces. Their edges are sharp and wavy. The single strong central spine is up to 2.5 centimeters long. The four to five side spines reach a length of 4 to 5 millimeters. The flowers reach a length of 20 to 25 centimeters. Their pericarpel and the corolla tube are virtually without wool, but filled with large scurf’s. The spherical, red fruits are edible and strongly tuberculate. They have diameters of 4 to 4.5 centimetres.

== Distribution ==
Harrisia bonplandii can be found in the southwest of Brazil, in Paraguay, in Bolivia and in the north of Argentina in the Chaco at elevations of 80–900 meters.

== Taxonomy ==
The first description as Cereus bonplandii was realized at 1837 from Ludwig Karl Georg Pfeiffer. Nathaniel Lord Britton and Joseph Nelson Rose classified the type in 1920 as Genus Harrisia. Nomenclature synonyms are Eriocereus bonplandii (J.Parm. & Pfeiff.) Riccob. (1909) and Harrisia pomanensis subsp. bonplandii (J.Parm. & Pfeiff.) P.J.Braun & Esteves (1994, not the correct Name ICBN-Artikel 11.4).

== Invasiveness ==
=== South Africa ===
Harrisia bonplandii is classified as a Category 1a invader in South Africa due to its invasive nature in the forested and savannah regions of the North West and Limpopo; it is targeted for national eradication.

== Literature ==
- Edward F. Anderson (2005), Das große Kakteen-Lexikon (in German), Urs Eggli (trans.), Stuttgart: Eugen Ulmer KG, p. 338, ISBN 3-8001-4573-1
