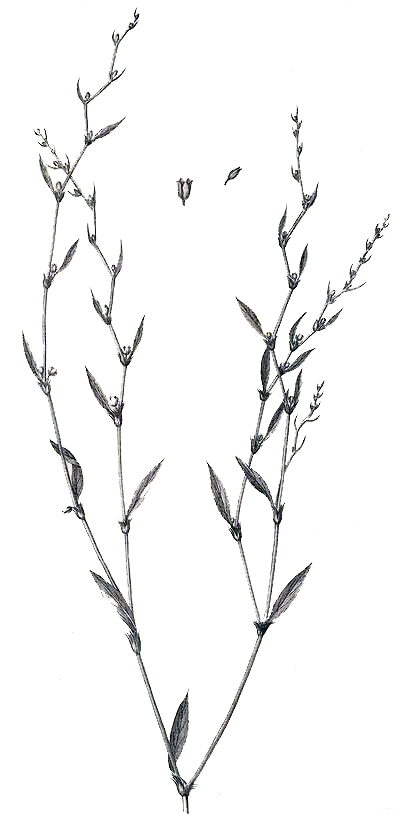

Scientific classification
- Kingdom: Plantae
- Clade: Tracheophytes
- Clade: Angiosperms
- Clade: Eudicots
- Order: Caryophyllales
- Family: Polygonaceae
- Genus: Polygonum
- Species: P. bellardii

Binomial name
- Polygonum bellardii All.

Synonyms
- Polygonum nudum

= Polygonum bellardii =

Species of plant

Polygonum bellardii, the narrowleaf knotweed, is a species of annual herb in the family Polygonaceae. They have a self-supporting growth form and simple, broad leaves. They are native to Southern Europe, West Asia and North Africa. Individuals can grow to 0.49 m.

== Sources ==
This article incorporates text from a free content work. Licensed under CC0 (license statement/permission). Text taken from Polygonum bellardii. Encyclopedia of Life.
