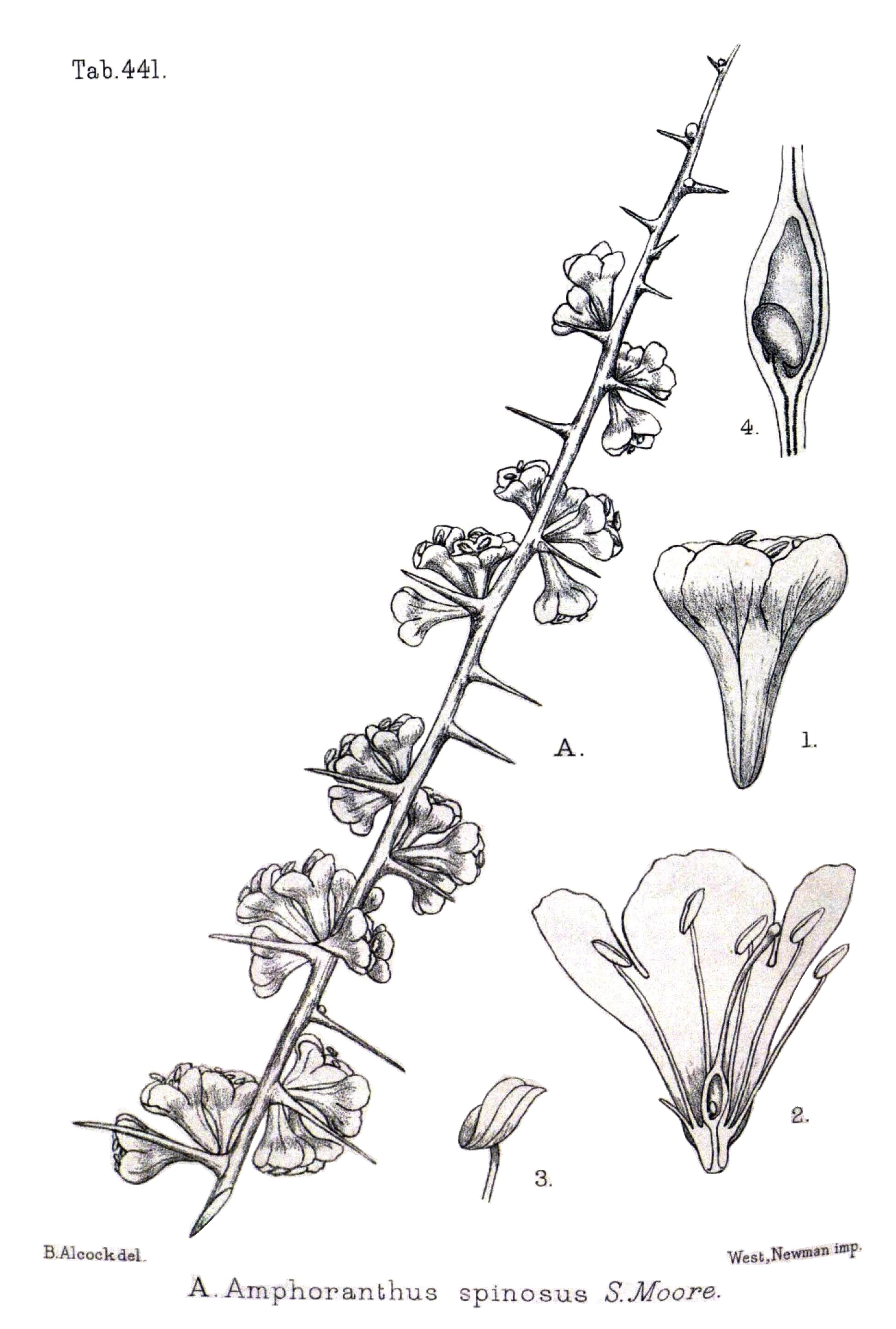

Scientific classification
- Kingdom: Plantae
- Clade: Tracheophytes
- Clade: Angiosperms
- Clade: Eudicots
- Order: Caryophyllales
- Family: Nyctaginaceae
- Tribe: Bougainvilleae
- Genus: Phaeoptilum; Radlk.
- Species: P. spinosum

Binomial name
- Phaeoptilum spinosum Radlk.
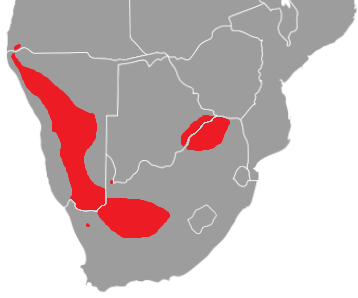
- range

Synonyms
- Amphoranthus spinosus (Radlk.) S.Moore; Phaeoptilum heimerli Engl.

= Phaeoptilum =

Brittle thorn

Genus of shrub

Phaeoptilum spinosum (brittle thorn) is a shrub that occurs in central Namibia. It is the only species in the genus Phaeoptilum. It is a valuable drought-resistant fodder plant, browsed by goats and kudu. The bush bears winged red fruits in October.

== Gallery ==
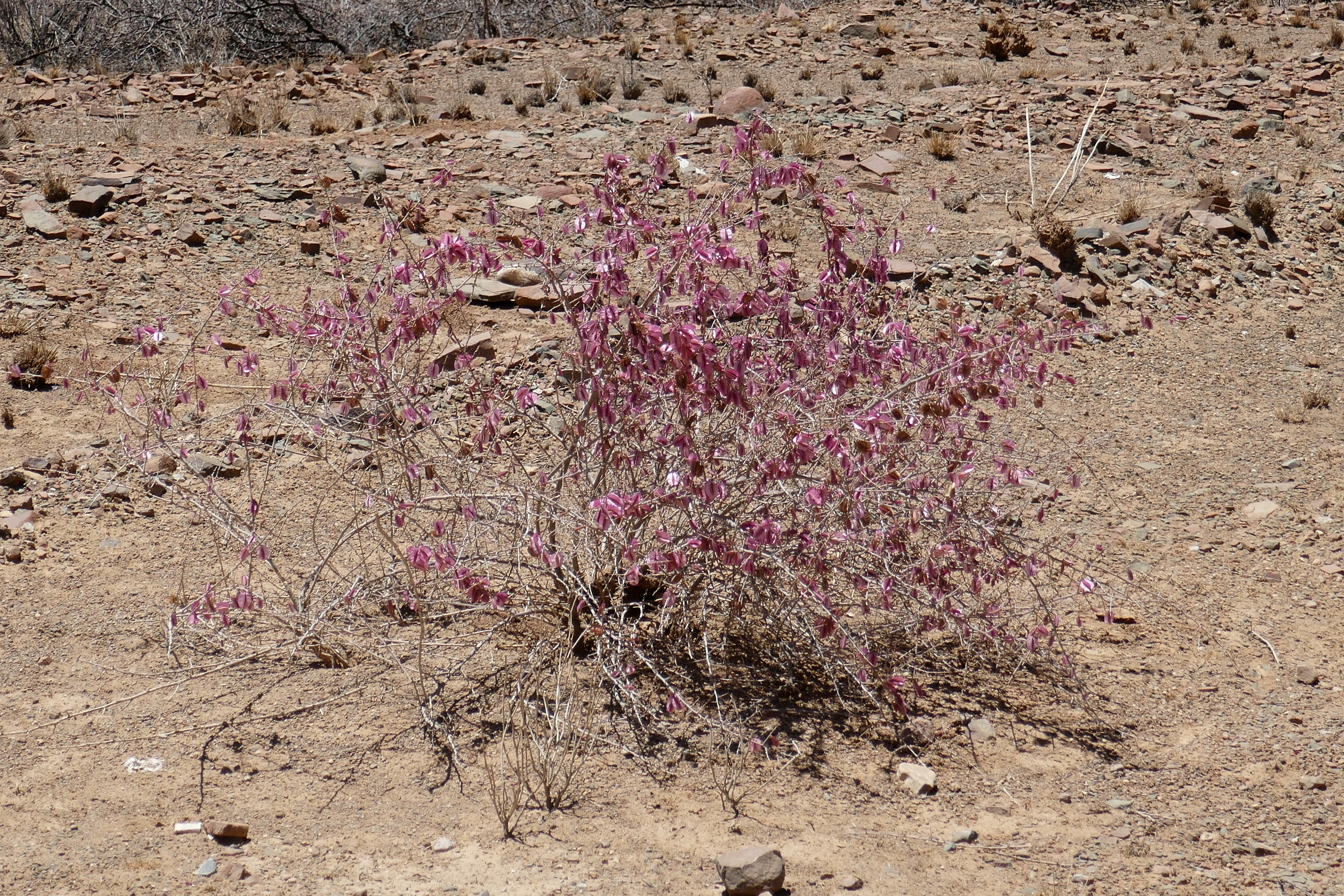
Habit in the Naukluft

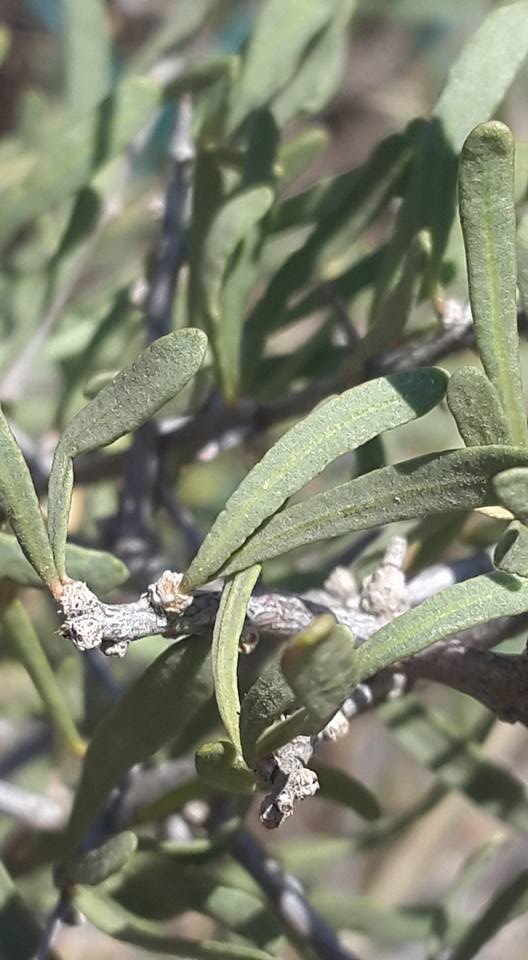
Foliage in fascicles

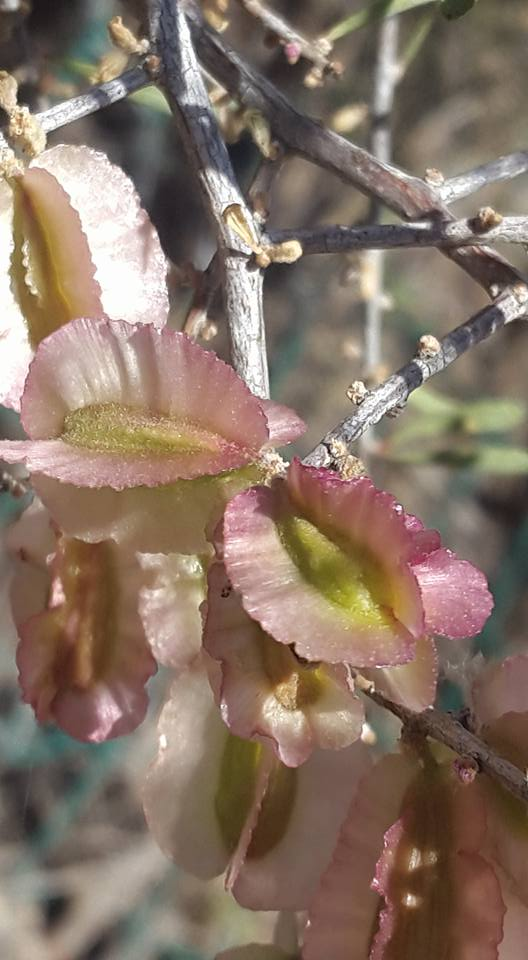
Anthocarp fruit

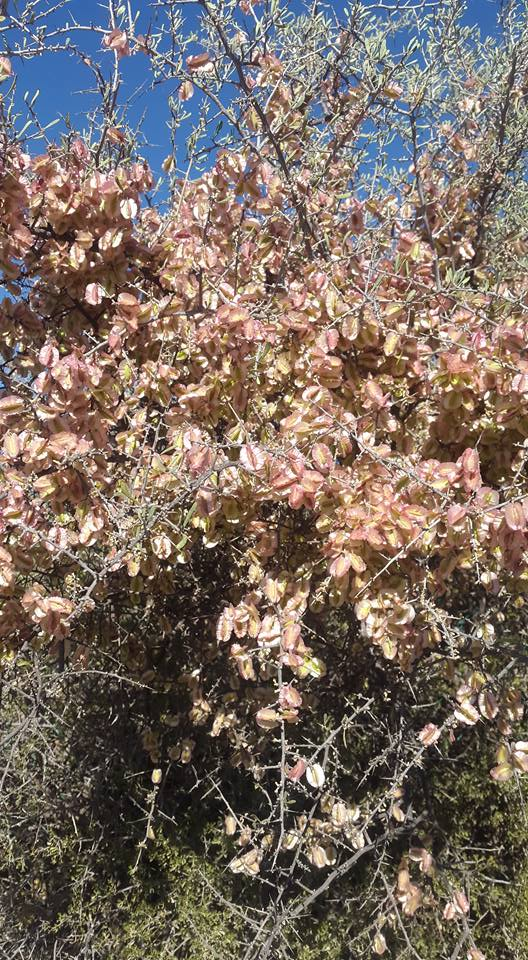
Anthocarp fruit
