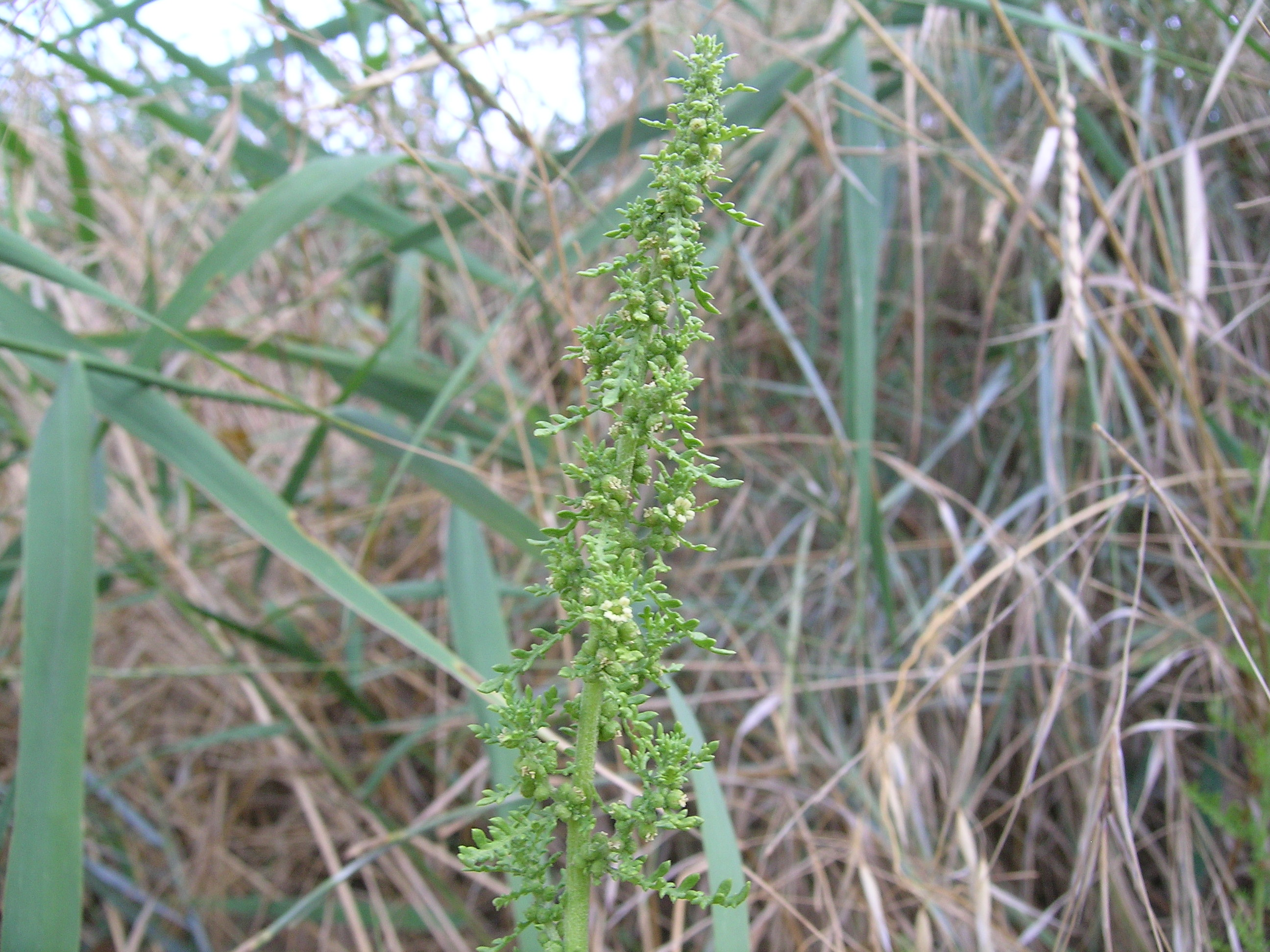

Scientific classification
- Kingdom: Plantae
- Clade: Tracheophytes
- Clade: Angiosperms
- Clade: Eudicots
- Order: Caryophyllales
- Family: Amaranthaceae
- Genus: Dysphania
- Species: D. multifida

Binomial name
- Dysphania multifida (L.) Mosyakin & Clemants

Synonyms
- Chenopodium multifidum; Roubieva multifida; Teloxys multifida

= Dysphania multifida =

Species of flowering plant

Dysphania multifida is a species of flowering plant in the family Amaranthaceae known by the common names cutleaf goosefoot and scented goosefoot.

It is native to South America, but it can be found on most continents as an introduced species. It grows easily in many habitat types, including disturbed areas such as roadsides. It is an annual herb with variously shaped stems up to about 60 centimeters long, branching and growing upright to flat along the ground. The oblong, glandular leaves are up to 2 centimeters long and have several lobes along each side. The inflorescences are located in leaf axils, spherical in shape and about half a centimeter long, with panicles of clusters located at the ends of stem branches. Each is a dense cluster of tiny flowers enclosing the developing fruit.
