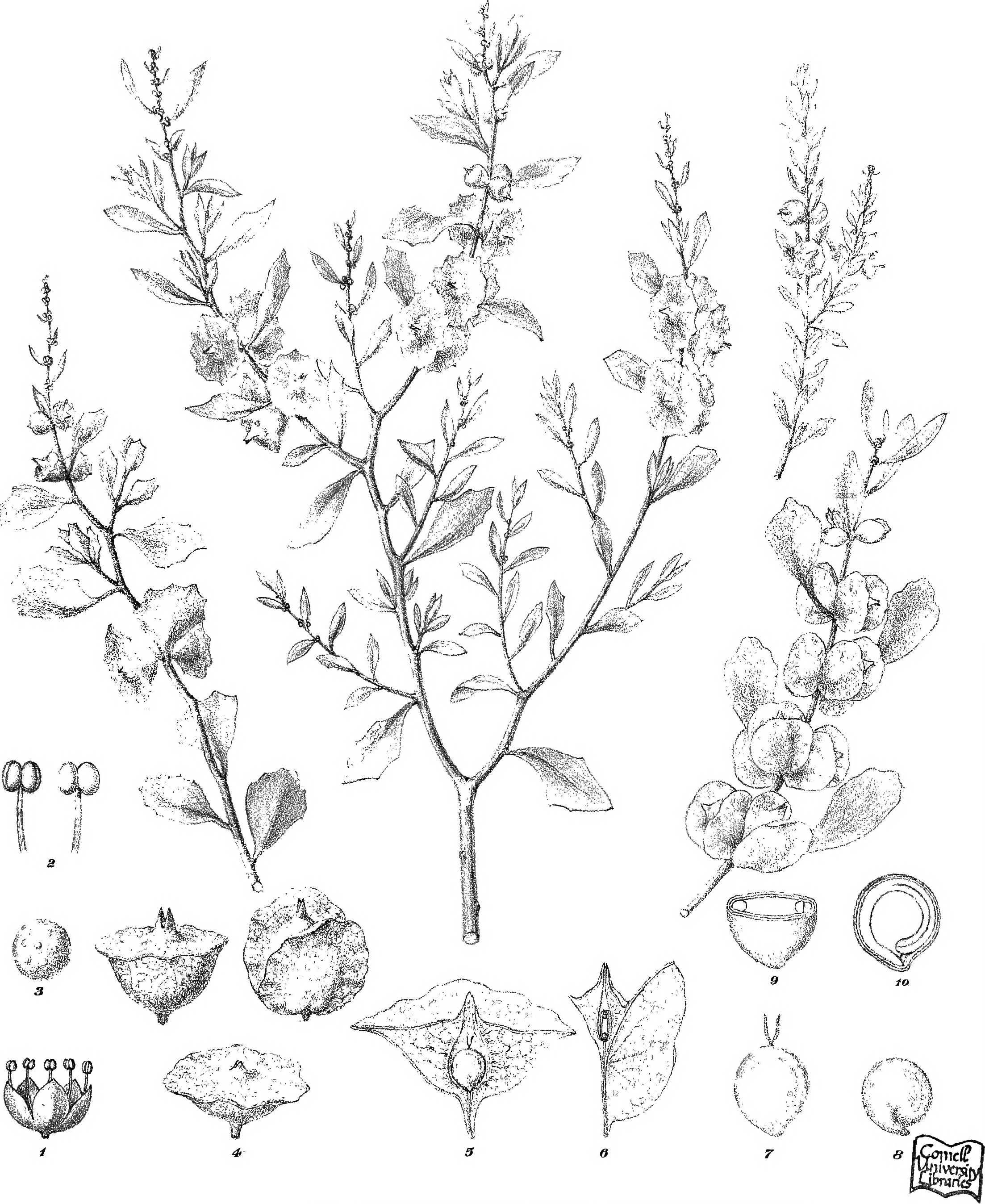

Scientific classification
- Kingdom: Plantae
- Clade: Tracheophytes
- Clade: Angiosperms
- Clade: Eudicots
- Order: Caryophyllales
- Family: Amaranthaceae
- Genus: Atriplex
- Species: A. lindleyi

Binomial name
- Atriplex lindleyi Moq.

Synonyms
- Atriplex halimoides

= Atriplex lindleyi =

Species of plant

Atriplex lindleyi is a species of saltbush known by the common name Lindley's saltbush. It is native to Australia, where it is widespread, especially in dry areas. It is known elsewhere as an introduced species, in California and the United States an invasive species.

== Description ==
This is an annual or perennial herb producing brittle, scaly whitish stems erect or spreading to lengths between 10 and 40 centimetres (3.9 and 15.7 in). The leaves are greenish white, scaly, and often toothed along the edges. They are widely lance-shaped to diamond in shape and up to 3 or 4 centimetres (1.2 or 1.6 in) long.

Male flowers are located in leaf axils or in spikelike inflorescences. Female flowers are generally held in small clusters below the male clusters in the leaf axils. The female inflorescence has spongy bracteoles up to 1 centimetre (0.39 in) long and inflated around the flowers.
