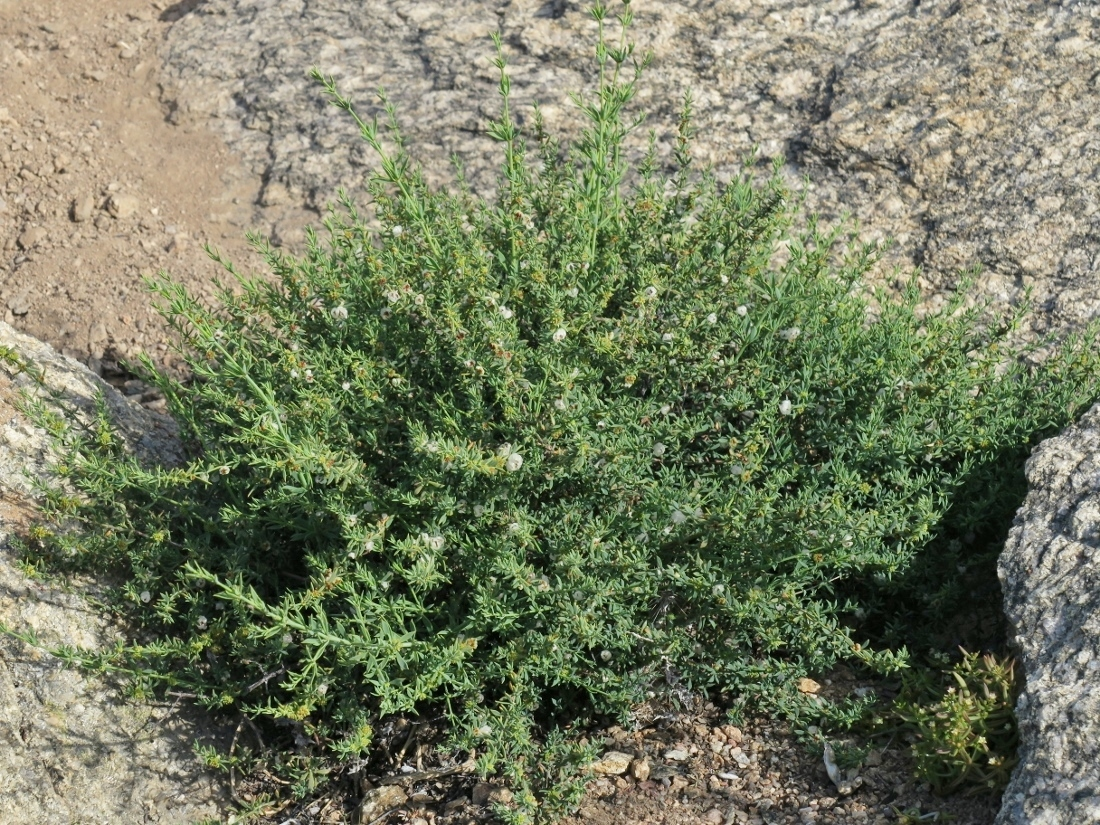

Scientific classification
- Kingdom: Plantae
- Clade: Tracheophytes
- Clade: Angiosperms
- Clade: Eudicots
- Order: Caryophyllales
- Family: Caryophyllaceae
- Genus: Pollichia; Aiton, 1789
- Species: P. campestris

Binomial name
- Pollichia campestris Aiton

Synonyms
- Bergia abyssinica A. Rich. (1847); Meerburgia glomerata Moench; Neckeria campestris J.F.Gmel.

= Pollichia =

Species of dwarf shrub found in Africa

Pollichia campestris, commonly known as waxberry or barley sugar bush, is a herbaceous plant in the family Caryophyllaceae and the only species in the monotypic genus Pollichia. It is found in southern and eastern Africa and in the Arabian peninsula.

== Taxonomy ==
Pollichia campestris was first described in 1789 by the Scottish botanist William Aiton in the publication Hortus Kewensis, a catalogue of all the plants then being cultivated at Kew Gardens.

== Description ==
Pollichia campestris is a much-branched subshrub growing to a height of about 60 cm (24 in). The erect stems have a covering of fine hairs when young. The leaves are greyish-green and hairy at first, measuring up to 3 by 1 cm (1.2 by 0.4 in), narrowly lanceolate or elliptical, with acute apexes, short stalks and small, membranous stipules. The inflorescence is a small, pubescent cyme growing in the axil of a leaf; the flowers are greenish-yellow with white bracts. The fruit is a capsule with a persistent receptacle and calyx, and the bracts become swollen and fleshy, waxy-white or dull orange.

== Distribution and habitat ==
Pollichia campestris is native to the Arabian peninsula, eastern Africa and southern Africa. Its range extends from Saudi Arabia and Yemen, through Eritrea and southwards in East Africa to Angola, Namibia, Zimbabwe and South Africa. Its typical habitat is grasslands, thickets, and open woodland on light, sandy soils, at elevations of up to 2,340 m (7,700 ft).

== Ecology ==
This is a common plant throughout much of Africa. It often forms part of the subcanopy in the Kalahari thornveld region of South Africa, but in Botswana it often grows in more open habitats. The fruits are attractive to birds and the seeds of this species are dispersed by them. The fruits are also eaten by people, the foliage is browsed by animals and the plant is used in traditional medicine to treat rheumatism and chest problems.
