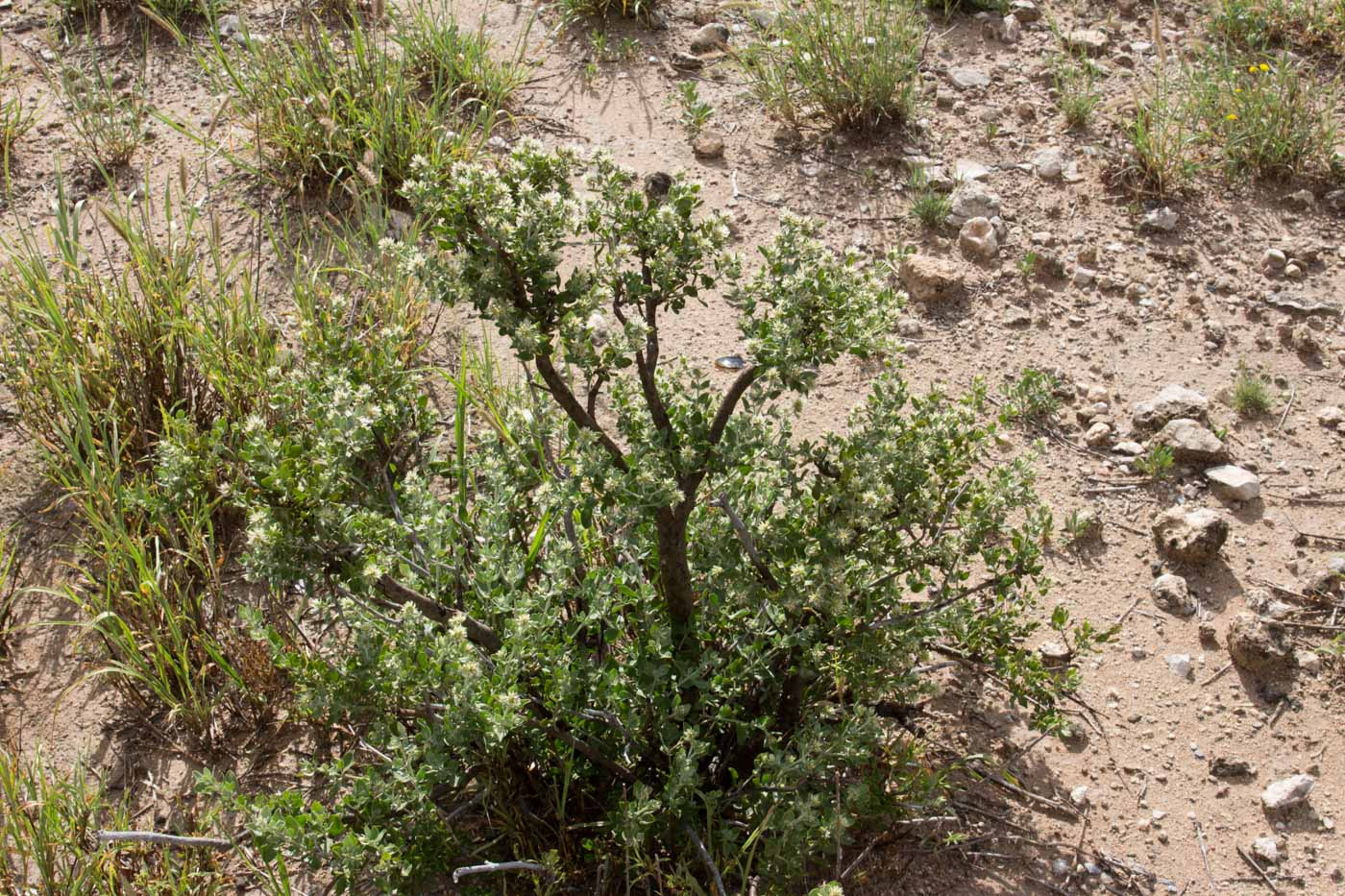

Scientific classification
- Kingdom: Plantae
- Clade: Tracheophytes
- Clade: Angiosperms
- Clade: Eudicots
- Order: Caryophyllales
- Family: Amaranthaceae
- Genus: Leucosphaera; Gilg (1897)
- Species: L. bainesii

Binomial name
- Leucosphaera bainesii (Hook.f.) Gilg (1897)

Synonyms
- Leucosphaera pfeilii Gilg (1897); Marcellia bainesii (Hook.f.) C.B.Clarke (1909) (basionym); Sericocoma bainesii Hook.f. (1880); Sericocomopsis bainesii (Hook.f.) Schinz (1895); Sericocoma pfeilii (Gilg) Kuntze (1903)

= Leucosphaera bainesii =

Species of plant

Leucosphaera bainesii is a species of flowering plant in the family Amaranthaceae. It is a subshrub native to southern tropical and southern Africa, ranging from Angola through Namibia, Botswana, and Zimbabwe to the Northern Provinces and Cape Provinces of South Africa. It is the only species in the monotypic genus Leucosphaera.
