= Carpetweed =

Carpetweed is a common name for several plants and may refer to:

- Aizoaceae, a family of flowering plants
- Ajuga reptans, a plant
- Molluginaceae, a family of flowering plants
  - Mollugo
    - Mollugo verticillata
- Phyla canescens
