= Hypertelis =

Scientific classification
- Kingdom: Plantae
- Clade: Tracheophytes
- Clade: Angiosperms
- Clade: Eudicots
- Order: Caryophyllales
- Family: Molluginaceae
- Genus: Hypertelis; E.Mey. ex Fenzl
- Species: H. spergulacea

Binomial name
- Hypertelis spergulacea E.Mey. ex Fenzl

Synonyms
- Mollugo linearis auct. non Ser.

Genus of flowering plants

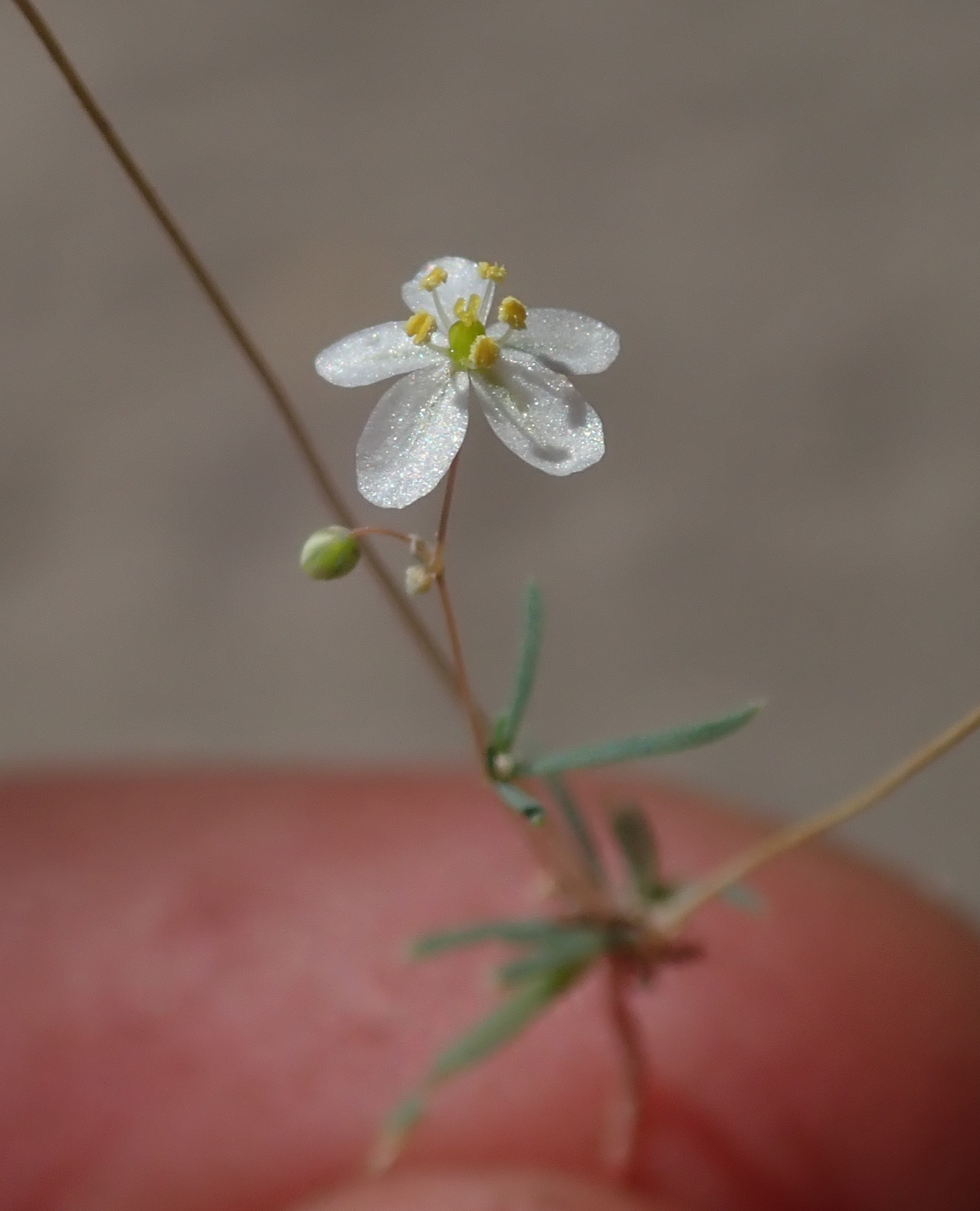
Hypertelis cerviana

Hypertelis is a genus of flowering plants in the family Molluginaceae. Most of its former species have been transferred to the new genus Kewa, and the remaining species, Hypertelis spergulacea, may also need a different placement. Hypertelis spergulacea is a woody-based plant, up to 30 cm (1 ft) high, with whorled greyish green leaves. It is found on the border between Namibia and the Northern Cape province of South Africa.

== Description ==
Hypertelis spergulacea grows to about 30 cm (1 ft) high, woody at the base with softer ascending stems. The lower leaves are crowded together and fleshy; further up the stem the leaves are arranged in well spaced whorls of five to ten. The individual leaves are narrowly linear, hairless (glabrous) and greyish green in colour. The inflorescence is somewhat umbellate, with individual flowers borne on long thin stems (pedicels). The flowers have 20–30 stamens, most united at the base into 3–5 groups. The seeds are black and shiny.

== Taxonomy ==
The genus Hypertelis was first described by Eduard Fenzl in 1836 in the first part of a monograph on what he regarded as two parts of the family Portulacaceae (Mollugineae and Steudelieae); he attributed the genus name to Ernst Heinrich Friedrich Meyer. He described the species Hypertelis spergulacea in 1839 in a second part of his monograph, again attributing the name to Meyer. Fenzl did not give a type for the genus; H. spergulacea was designated as the "type species" by E. P. Philips in 1951. H. spergulacea has been called Mollugo linearis by some authors, but the true M. linearis Ser. is not a synonym.

The genus had grown to nine species by 2011, when molecular phylogenetic studies found that H. spergulacea appeared to be nested within the genus Mollugo, and the other eight species of the genus were included in a clade well removed from Molluginaceae, close to the families Aizoaceae, Phytolaccaceae and Nyctaginaceae. Accordingly, in 2014, a new genus, Kewa, and family, Kewaceae, were proposed to accommodate these eight species. H. spergulacea was left in the genus, although it was noted that further reorganization of Mollugo might change its placement.

Among other features, Hypotelis spergulacea can be distinguished from Kewa by its stamens. It has more (20–30 rather than 3–15) and they are arranged in bundles. Its leaves are arranged in whorls, relatively far apart, rather than being alternate or more-or-less opposite along the stems, as in Kewa.

=== Former species ===
Species transferred to Kewa in 2014 were:

- Hypertelis acida (Hook.f.) Müller = Kewa acida
- Hypertelis angrae-pequenae Friedrich = Kewa angrae-pequenae
- Hypertelis arenicola Sond. = Kewa arenicola
- Hypertelis bowkeriana Sond. = Kewa bowkeriana
- Hypertelis caespitosa Friedrich = Kewa caespitosa
- Hypertelis salsoloides (Burch.) Adamson = Kewa salsoloides
- Hypertelis suffruticosa (Baker) Adamson = Kewa suffruticosa
- Hypertelis trachysperma Adamson = Kewa trachysperma

== Distribution and habitat ==
Hypertelis spergulacea has been recorded from the border between Namibia and the Northern Cape province of South Africa. It grows at elevations of 100–600 m (300–2,000 ft).
