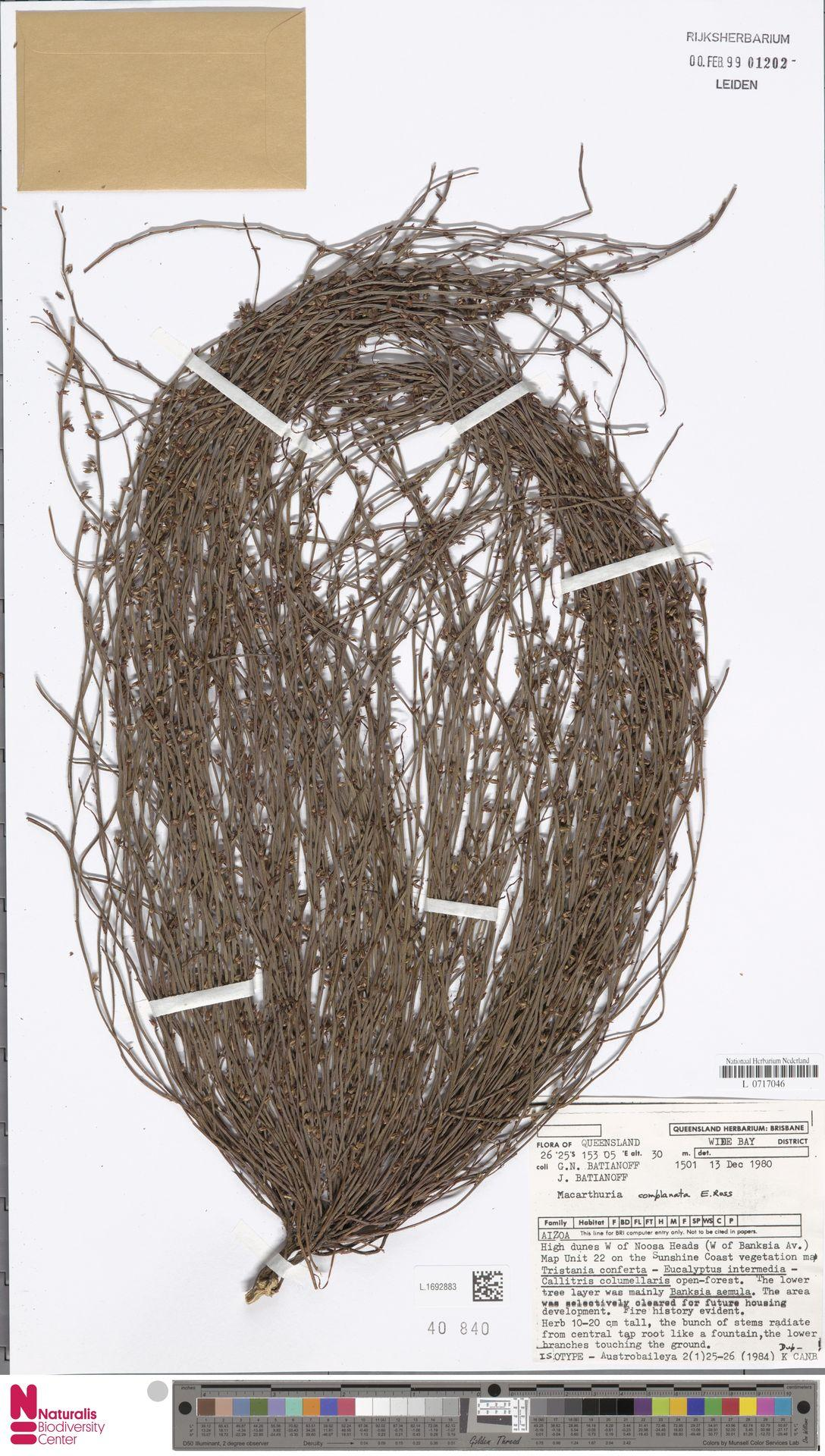

Scientific classification
- Kingdom: Plantae
- Clade: Embryophytes
- Clade: Tracheophytes
- Clade: Spermatophytes
- Clade: Angiosperms
- Clade: Eudicots
- Order: Caryophyllales
- Family: Macarthuriaceae
- Genus: Macarthuria
- Species: M. complanata

Binomial name
- Macarthuria complanata E.M.Ross

= Macarthuria complanata =

Australian endemic plant

Macarthuria complanata is a species of plant in the Macarthuriaceae family, endemic to the eastern coast of Australia. The feature that differentiates this species from others in the genus is that its stems are narrowly to broadly winged; pedicels 0.5–1 (–1.5) mm long. M. complanata inhabits dry heath habitat occurring on Noosa National Park, and Rainbow Beach. Noosa provides a stronghold for the species, with 14 known locations.

The leaves of species in this genus are mostly basal, shortly petiolate; cauline leaves alternate, reduced to scales. The flowers are small, pedicellate, in lateral or terminal, short, irregular cymes, or forming a spreading dichotomous cyme with opposite bracts. The outer perianth whorl 5-partite, persistent. Inner perianth deeply 5-lobed and petaloid, or absent. Stamens 8; filaments are united at the base. Ovary superior, 3-locular; ovules 1–3 per loculus; placentation basal; styles 3. The fruit is a capsule, dehiscing loculicidally in 3 valves; seeds arillate.

== Discovery ==
This species was first described by E.M. Ross in 1984.
