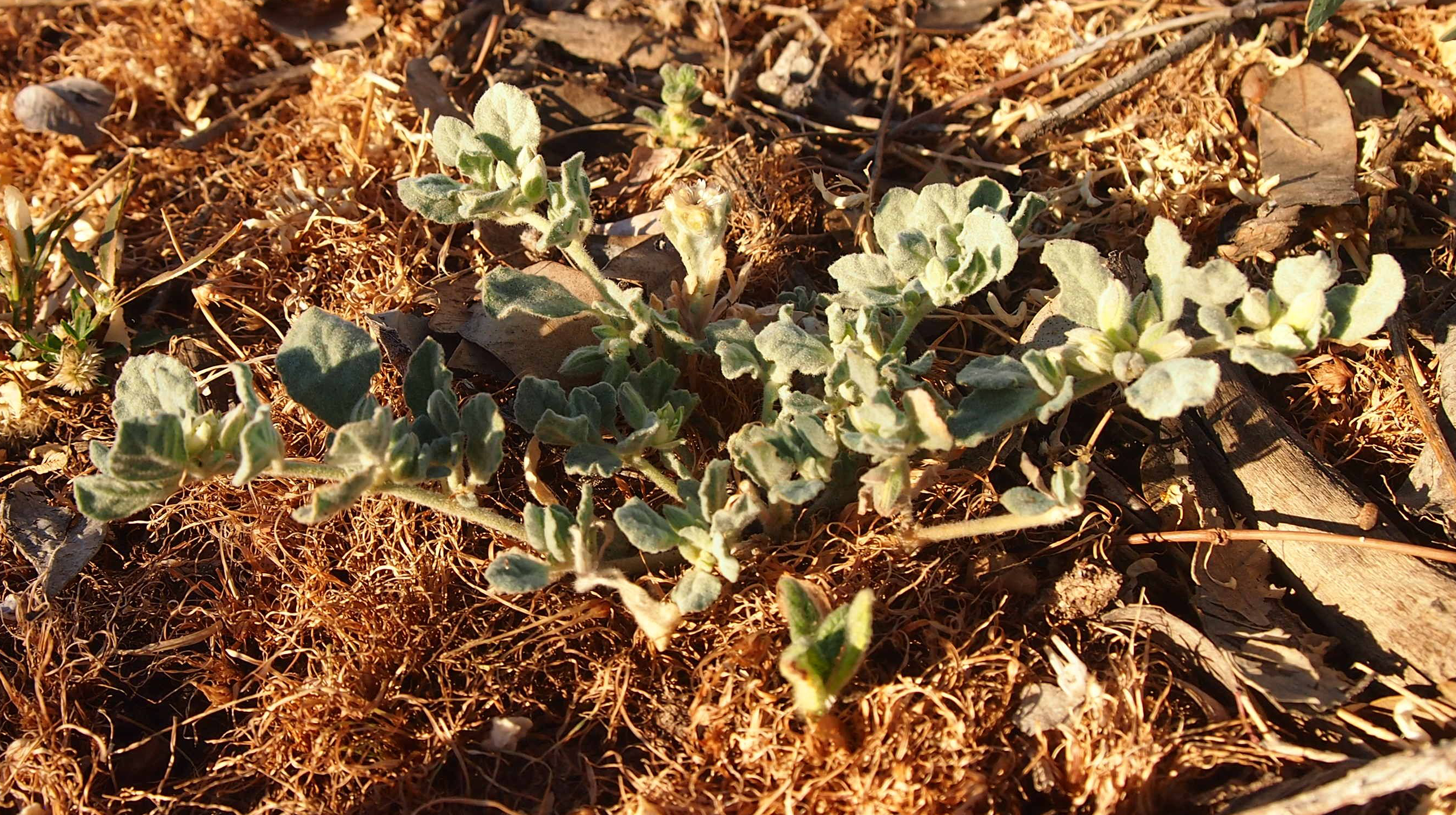

Scientific classification
- Kingdom: Plantae
- Clade: Tracheophytes
- Clade: Angiosperms
- Clade: Eudicots
- Order: Caryophyllales
- Family: Molluginaceae
- Genus: Glinus
- Species: G. lotoides

Binomial name
- Glinus lotoides L.

= Glinus lotoides =

Species of flowering plant

Glinus lotoides is a species of flowering plant in the family Molluginaceae known by the common names damascisa and lotus sweetjuice. It is native to Eurasia and Africa and it is known in many other places as an introduced species.

== Description ==
It is a prostrate to somewhat upright annual herb with a stem up to about 30 or 35 centimeters long and coated in feltlike whitish hairs. The oval or spade-shaped leaves are located in whorls about the stem. Each is a few millimeters to 3 centimeters long. The inflorescence is a tight cluster of five to ten small flowers. Each flower has five woolly sepals and no petals. The fruit is an oval capsule about four millimeters long.

== Uses ==
This plant is found in seasonally inundated land and has many traditional uses in cultures across its large native range, as medicine and as food. Young leaves and stems of Glinus lotoides are used as a vegetable in some tropical countries.
