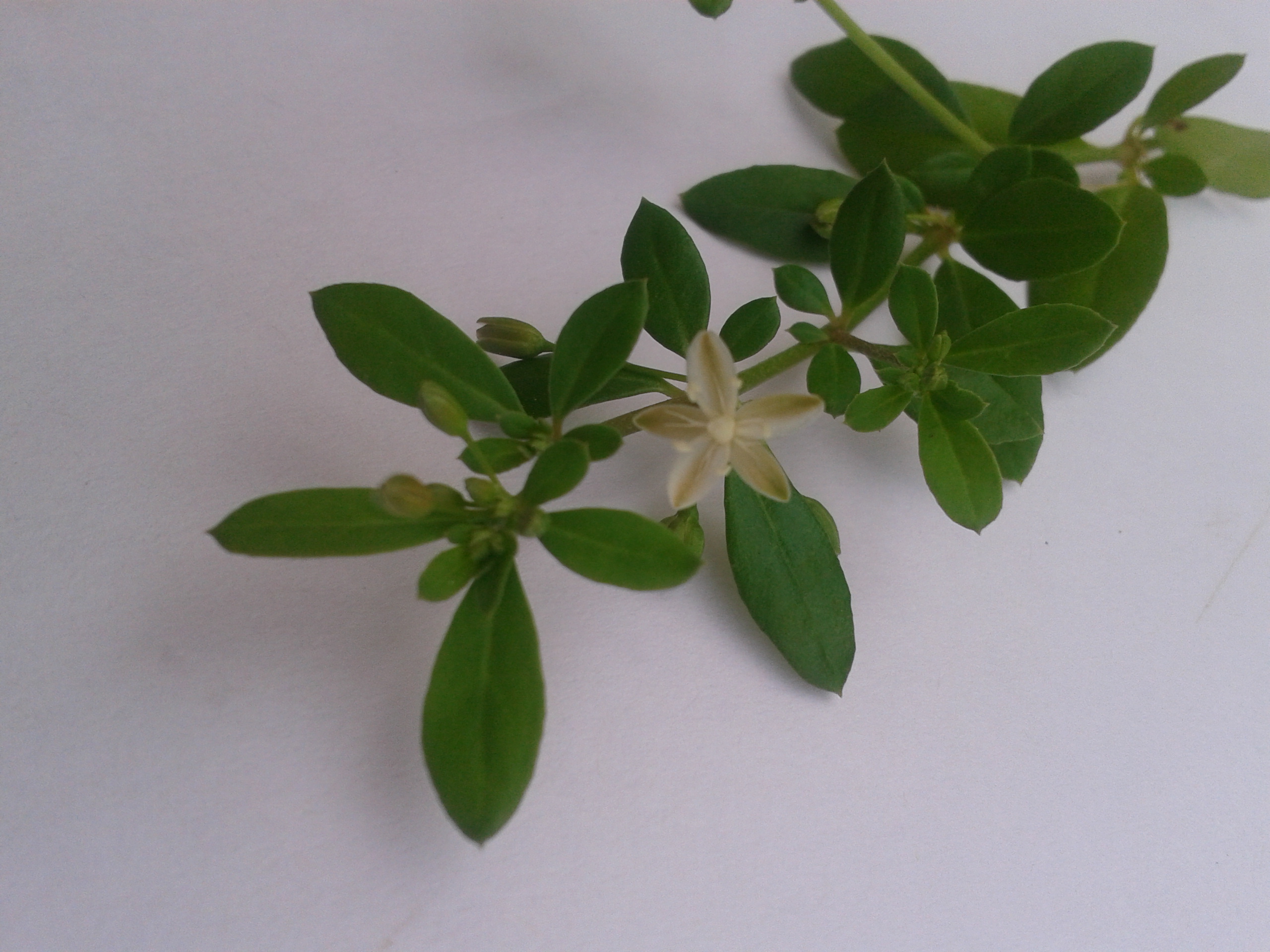
- Mollugo cerviana (carpet weed)

Scientific classification
- Kingdom: Plantae
- Clade: Tracheophytes
- Clade: Angiosperms
- Clade: Eudicots
- Order: Caryophyllales
- Family: Molluginaceae
- Genus: Mollugo
- Species: M. cerviana

Binomial name
- Mollugo cerviana (L.) Ser.

= Mollugo cerviana =

Species of flowering plant

Mollugo cerviana is a species of flowering plant known by the common name threadstem carpetweed. It can be found on most continents growing as a weed in many types of dry, sandy habitat types. It is an annual herb producing a thin, erect stem up to about 20 centimeters tall. The narrow, waxy leaves are up to 1.5 centimeters long, linear in shape, and arranged in whorls around the stem. The inflorescence is a loose umbel of tiny flowers each made up of whitish, petal-like sepals less than 2 millimeters long, and no true petals.
