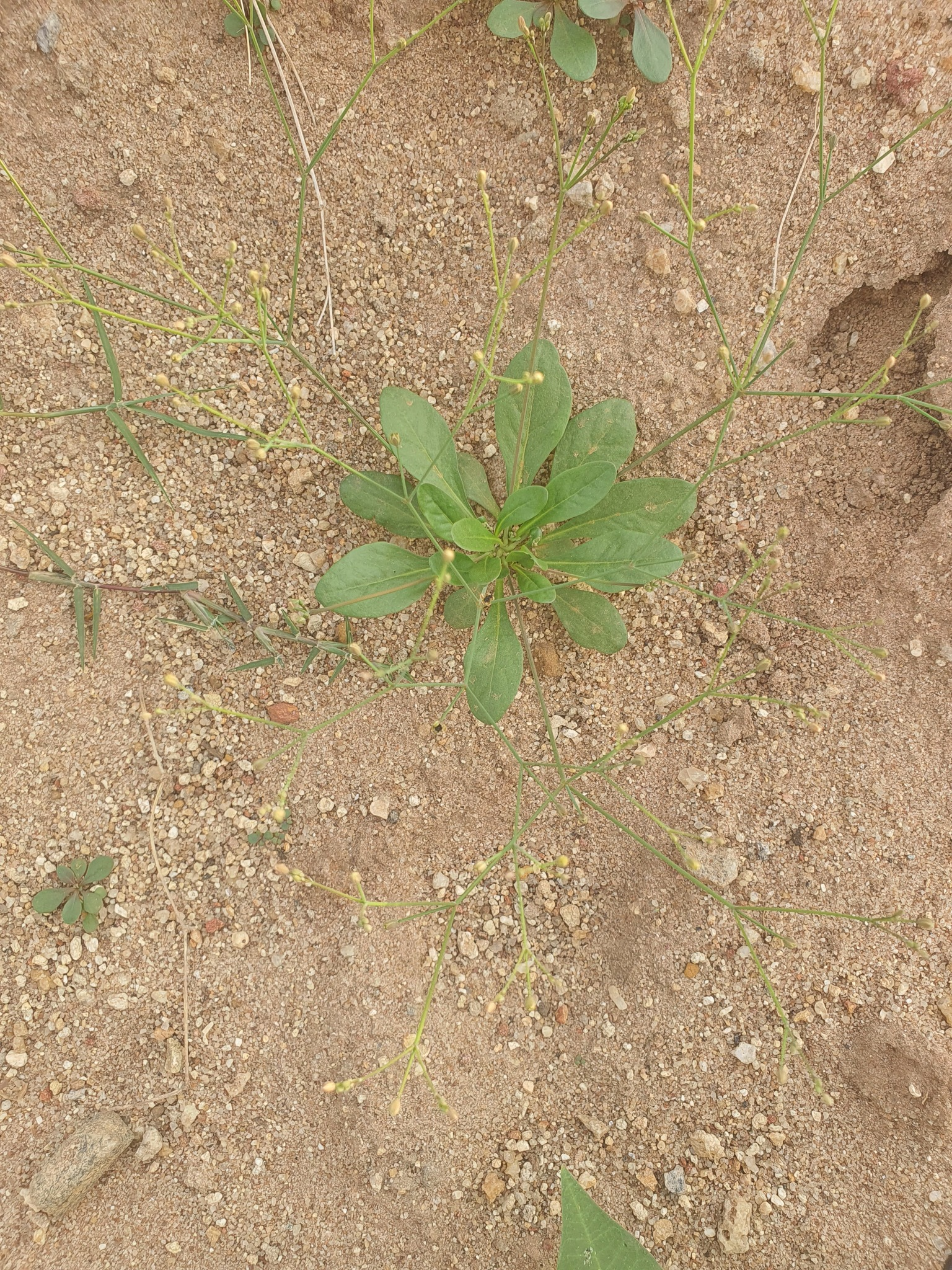

Scientific classification
- Kingdom: Plantae
- Clade: Tracheophytes
- Clade: Angiosperms
- Clade: Eudicots
- Order: Caryophyllales
- Family: Molluginaceae
- Genus: Paramollugo
- Species: P. nudicaulis

Binomial name
- Paramollugo nudicaulis (Lam.) Thulin

= Paramollugo nudicaulis =

Species of plant

Paramollugo nudicaulis is a species of plant in the genus Paramollugo. Originally native to Madagascar and surrounding islands, it has become widely dispersed as a weed across tropical Africa, southern Arabia, and South and Southeast Asia.
