= Polpoda capensis =

Scientific classification
- Kingdom: Plantae
- Clade: Tracheophytes
- Clade: Angiosperms
- Clade: Eudicots
- Order: Caryophyllales
- Family: Molluginaceae
- Genus: Polpoda
- Species: P. capensis

Binomial name
- Polpoda capensis C.Presl

Species of flowering plant

Polpoda capensis is a species of flowering plant in the family Molluginaceae, and the type species of the genus Polpoda. It is endemic to the Western Cape region of South Africa.

== Taxonomy ==
Polpoda capensis was first described by the Carl Borivoj Presl in the 19th century. It was designated the type species of the genus Polpoda, with the type specimen collected by Franz Sieber near Cape Town.

== Importance ==
Polpoda capensis is important as the type species of its genus and contributes to the biodiversity of the Cape Floristic Region, a recognized biodiversity hotspot.

== See also ==
- Molluginaceae
- Cape Floristic Region
- Flora of South Africa
