= Glinus radiatus =

Scientific classification
- Kingdom: Plantae
- Clade: Tracheophytes
- Clade: Angiosperms
- Clade: Eudicots
- Order: Caryophyllales
- Family: Molluginaceae
- Genus: Glinus
- Species: G. radiatus

Binomial name
- Glinus radiatus (Ruiz & Pav.) Rohrb.

Synonyms
- Mollugo radiata Ruiz & Pav.; Glinus cambessedesii Fenzl; Glinus glaber Larrañaga; Mollugo araucana Phil.; Mollugo cambessedesii (Fenzl) Coult.; Mollugo glinoides Cambess.

Species of flowering plant

Glinus radiatus is a species of flowering plant in the family Molluginaceae, known by the common name spreading sweetjuice.

It is native to the Pantanal ecoregion of Brazil.
