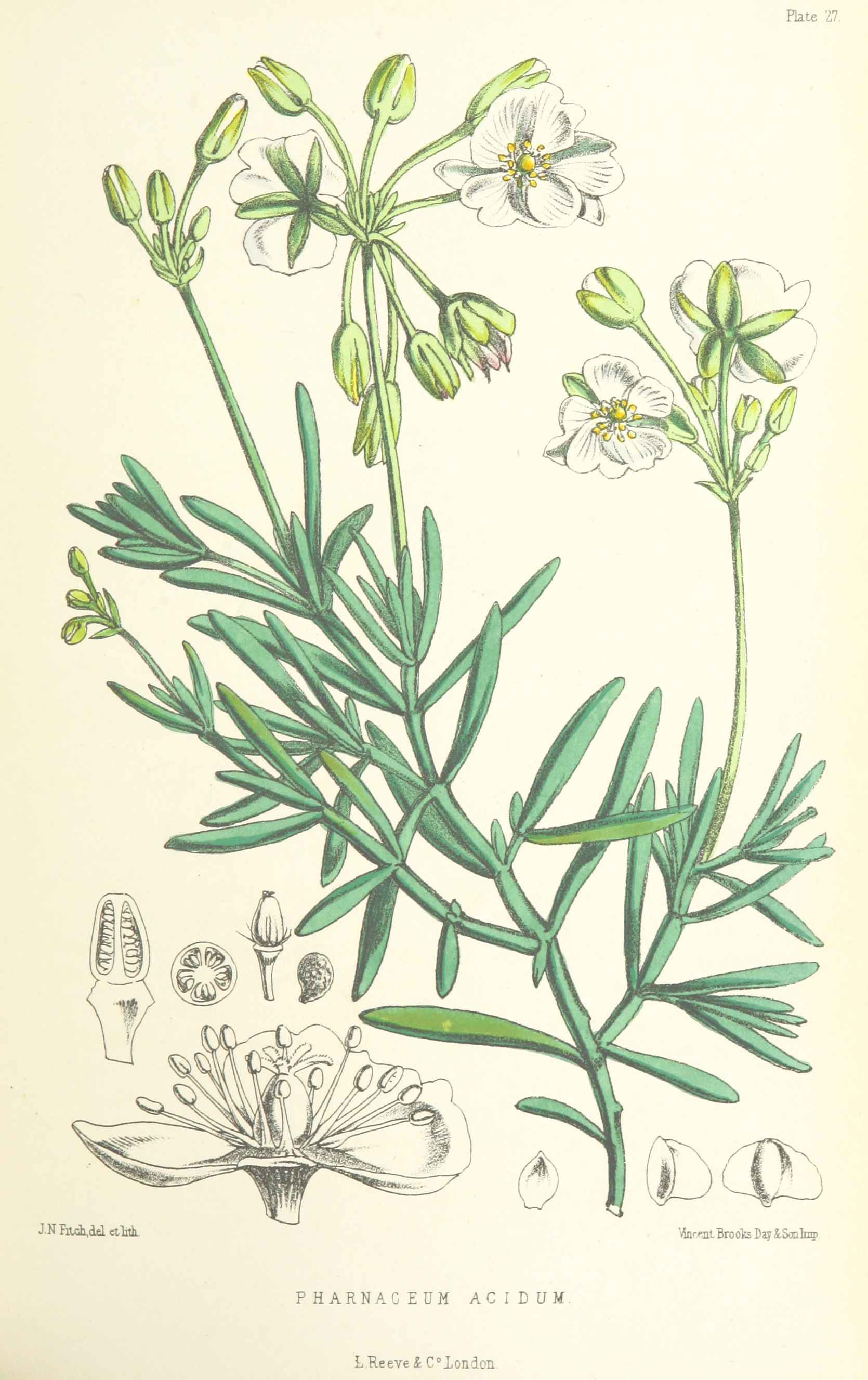

Conservation status
- Critically Endangered (IUCN 3.1)

Scientific classification
- Kingdom: Plantae
- Clade: Embryophytes
- Clade: Tracheophytes
- Clade: Spermatophytes
- Clade: Angiosperms
- Clade: Eudicots
- Order: Caryophyllales
- Family: Kewaceae
- Genus: Kewa
- Species: K. acida

Binomial name
- Kewa acida (Hook.f.) Christenh.

Synonyms
- Hypertelis acida (Hook.f.) K.Müll.; Pharnaceum acidum Hook.f.

= Kewa acida =

Species of flowering plant

Kewa acida, commonly called the salad plant, is one of the eight species currently recognized in the genus Kewa, the sole genus in the family Kewaceae. It is a bushy grey-leaved annual or short-lived perennial plant, with white flowers, endemic to Saint Helena. It is regarded as Critically Endangered. The succulent leaves are high in Vitamin C and were used by sailors in the past as a scurvy preventative.

== Description ==
Kewa acida is a succulent annual or short-lived perennial, growing up to 30 cm (1 ft) tall by about 1 m (3 ft) wide. It has a spreading, bush-like habit, with stems that may be woody at the base. The succulent leaves are narrow, usually 30–40 mm (1.2–1.6 in) long by 3 mm (0.1 in) wide, but occasionally longer, and are smooth, with a bluish-grey waxy coat. The inflorescence is a false umbel with two to seven flowers, each on a stem (pedicel) up to 2 cm (0.8 in) long. The white flowers are about 25 mm (1.0 in) across. The flower has five tepals arranged in a single whorl. Characteristic of the genus Kewa, the outer two appear to be sepals, being green; one appears to be half sepal and half petal; and the inner two appear to be petals, being white with a green stripe on the back. The stamens are arranged in two whorls: ten paired in one whorl alternating with five single in the other. The ovary is superior (visible inside the tepals). The fruit is yellowish-brown, dehiscent, containing small black seeds.

== Taxonomy ==
Kewa acida was first described by Joseph Dalton Hooker in 1868, as Pharnaceum acidum. In 1908, Konrad Müller transferred it to the genus Hypertelis, as H. acida. Müller placed Hypertelis in the family Aizoaceae, but it was subsequently placed in Molluginaceae. Molecular phylogenetic studies in the 21st century showed that most of the species placed in Hypertelis did not belong there, and in 2014 a new genus, Kewa, was established for eight species, including K. acida.

== Distribution, habitat and conservation ==
Kewa acida is endemic to the mid-Atlantic island of St Helena. It is found in hot, dry coastal regions, up to 550 m (1,800 ft) in elevation. It tends to be annual and hence smaller in drier areas, but can become perennial and shrubby where there is more moisture.

Because it only occurs only on a single island in an area of about 33 km^{2} (13 mi^{2}), the species is considered to be Critically Endangered, i.e. at a high risk of extinction. It is threatened by introduced animals, such as mice and rabbits, which eat the highly palatable leaves, and also by competition from introduced plants. Efforts have been made to exclude grazing animals. Seeds are stored at the Millennium Seed Bank, Kew.

== Uses ==
On St Helena, Kewa acida has been called the "salad plant". Its leaves have a salty acid taste and are high in vitamin C, so were used by sailors to prevent scurvy.

== Cultivation ==
Kewa acida is in cultivation at Kew Gardens, originating from seeds collected in 2009. It is grown in a porous, low-nutrient potting compost, and kept at a minimum temperature of 10 °C (50 °F) at night, higher in the daytime. It can be propagated by seeds or by cuttings.
