= Suessenguthiella caespitosa =

Conservation status
- Least Concern (IUCN 3.1)

Scientific classification
- Kingdom: Plantae
- Clade: Tracheophytes
- Clade: Angiosperms
- Clade: Eudicots
- Order: Caryophyllales
- Family: Molluginaceae
- Genus: Suessenguthiella
- Species: S. caespitosa

Binomial name
- Suessenguthiella caespitosa Friedrich

Species of flowering plant

Suessenguthiella caespitosa is a species of plant in the Molluginaceae family. It is endemic to Namibia. Its natural habitat is rocky areas.
