= Trigastrotheca =

Trigastrotheca may refer to:

- Trigastrotheca (wasp), a genus of insects in the family Braconidae
- Trigastrotheca (plant), a genus of flowering plants in the family Molluginaceae
