= Polpoda stipulacea =

Scientific classification
- Kingdom: Plantae
- Clade: Tracheophytes
- Clade: Angiosperms
- Clade: Eudicots
- Order: Caryophyllales
- Family: Molluginaceae
- Genus: Polpoda
- Species: P. stipulacea

Binomial name
- Polpoda stipulacea (F.M.Leight.) Adamson

Species of flowering plant

Polpoda stipulacea is a species of flowering plant in the family Molluginaceae. It is native to parts of southern Africa, including South Africa and Namibia.

== Distribution ==
This species is found primarily in South Africa, especially in the Cape Provinces and Namibia, where it grows in dry, open habitats.
