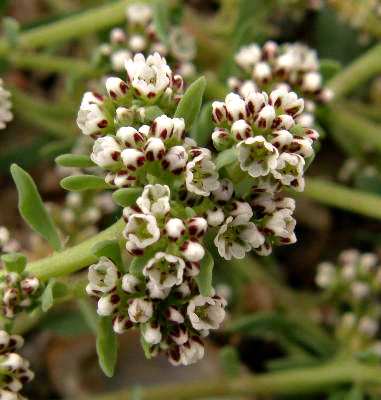

Scientific classification
- Kingdom: Plantae
- Clade: Tracheophytes
- Clade: Angiosperms
- Clade: Eudicots
- Order: Caryophyllales
- Family: Caryophyllaceae
- Genus: Corrigiola
- Species: C. litoralis

Binomial name
- Corrigiola litoralis L.

= Corrigiola litoralis =

Species of flowering plant

Corrigiola litoralis is a species of flowering plant known by the common name strapwort. It can be found as a native species in Europe and Africa, and has been introduced to Australia and North America. In Europe it is a plant of shingly pool margins where water levels fluctuate. In Africa it is found in a variety of habitats.
