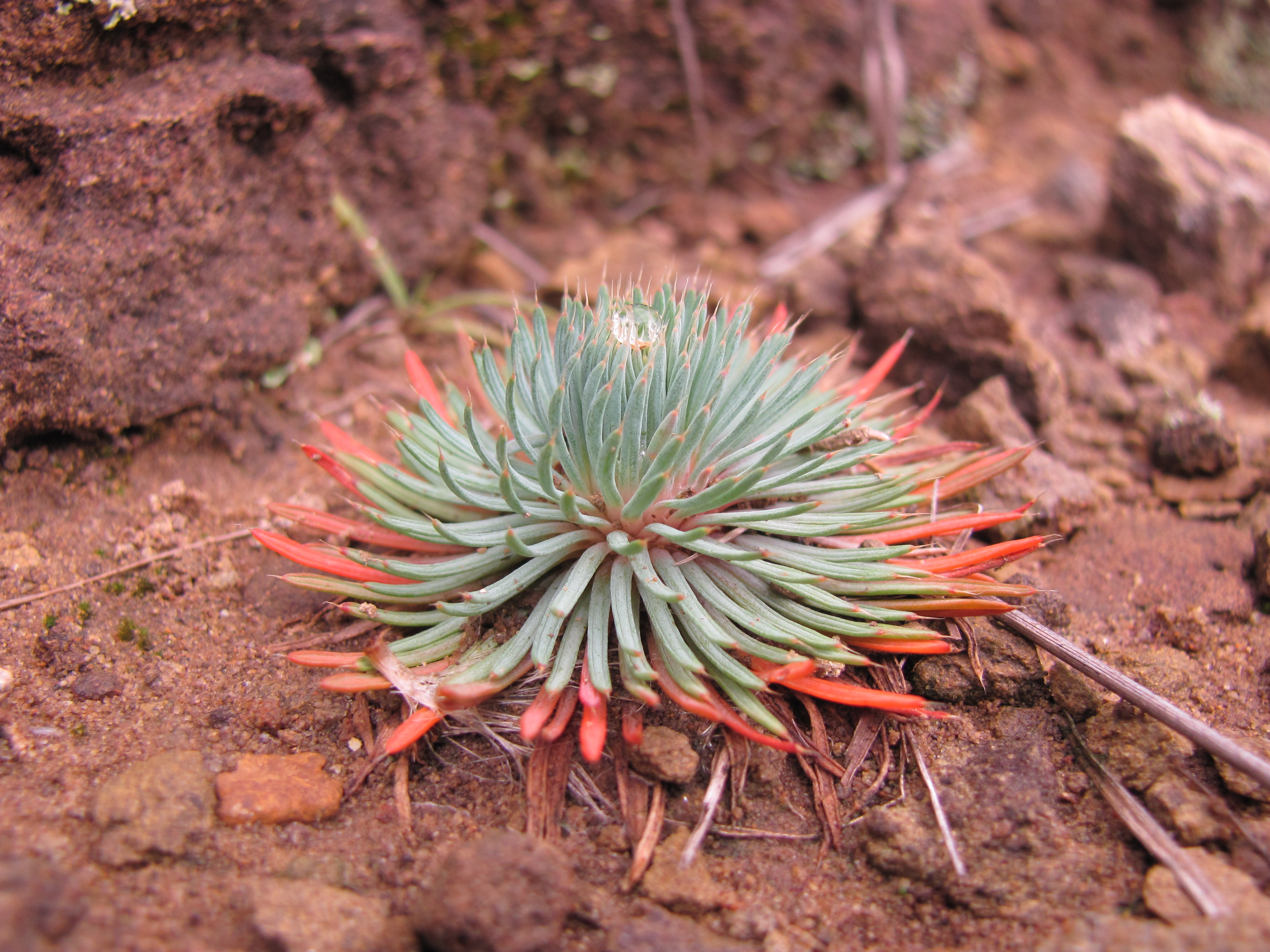
- Psammotropha myriantha

Scientific classification
- Kingdom: Plantae
- Clade: Tracheophytes
- Clade: Angiosperms
- Clade: Eudicots
- Order: Caryophyllales
- Family: Molluginaceae
- Genus: Psammotropha; Eckl. & Zeyh.

= Psammotropha =

Genus of plants

Psammotropha is a genus of flowering plants belonging to the family Molluginaceae.

Its native range is Tanzania to Southern Africa.

Species:

- Psammotropha alternifolia Killick
- Psammotropha anguina Compton
- Psammotropha diffusa Adamson
- Psammotropha frigida Schltr.
- Psammotropha marginata (Thunb.) Druce
- Psammotropha mucronata (Thunb.) Fenzl
- Psammotropha myriantha Sond.
- Psammotropha obovata Adamson
- Psammotropha obtusa Adamson
- Psammotropha quadrangularis (L.f.) Fenzl
- Psammotropha spicata Adamson
