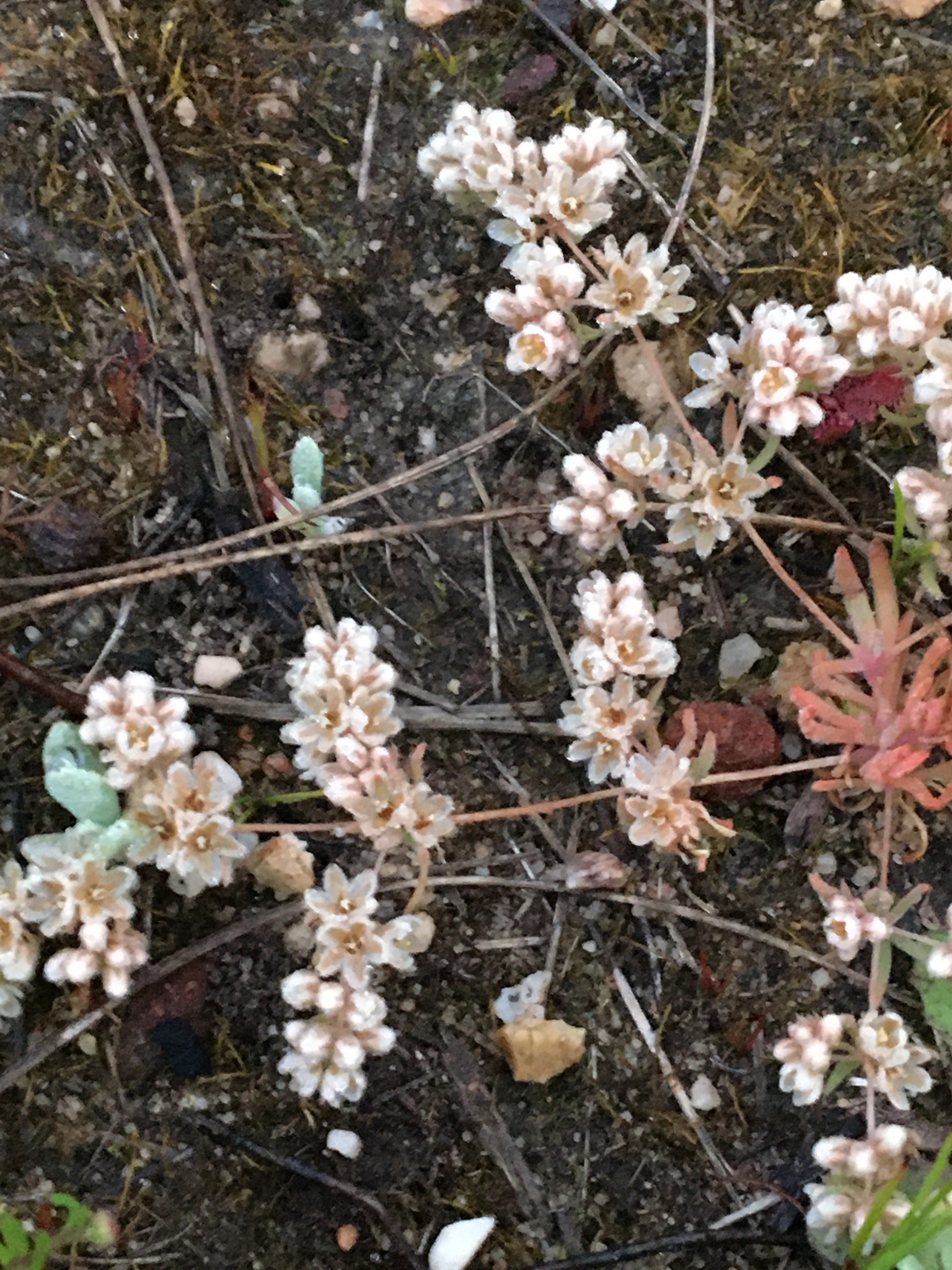
- Adenogramma mollugo

Scientific classification
- Kingdom: Plantae
- Clade: Tracheophytes
- Clade: Angiosperms
- Clade: Eudicots
- Order: Caryophyllales
- Family: Molluginaceae
- Genus: Adenogramma; Rchb.

= Adenogramma =

Genus of flowering plants

Adenogramma is a genus of flowering plants belonging to the family Molluginaceae.

Its native range is Southern Africa.

Species:

- Adenogramma asparagoides Adamson
- Adenogramma capillaris (Eckl. & Zeyh.) Druce
- Adenogramma mollugo Rchb.
