= Telephium =

Scientific classification
- Kingdom: Plantae
- Clade: Tracheophytes
- Clade: Angiosperms
- Clade: Eudicots
- Order: Caryophyllales
- Family: Caryophyllaceae
- Tribe: Corrigioleae
- Genus: Telephium; L.

Species
- See text

Synonyms
- Merophragma Dulac; Raynaudetia Bubani

Genus of flowering plants

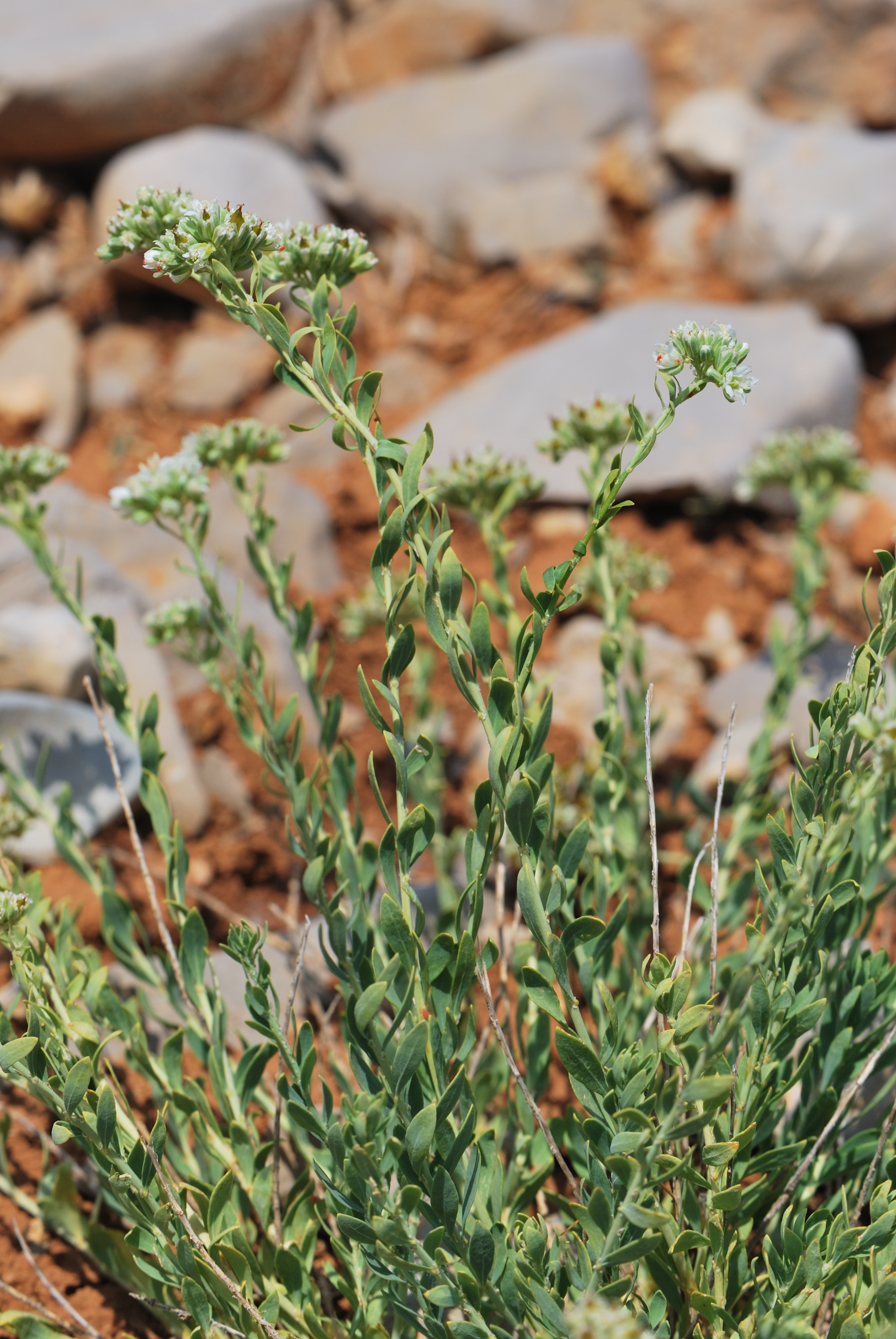

Telephium are a genus of flowering plants in the family Molluginaceae or Caryophyllaceae, found in Mediterranean parts of Europe, Africa, the Arabian Peninsula, and western Asia. They are annual or perennial herbs, sometimes becoming woody at their bases. Together with Corrigiola they form the tribe Corrigioleae.

The generic name is derived from a Greek word for a plant thought to be a symbol of reciprocated love ("far-off-lover").

== Species ==
Currently accepted species include:

- Telephium barbeyanum Bornm.
- Telephium eriglaucum F.N.Williams
- Telephium imperati L.
- Telephium oligospermum Steud. ex Boiss.
- Telephium sphaerospermum Boiss.
