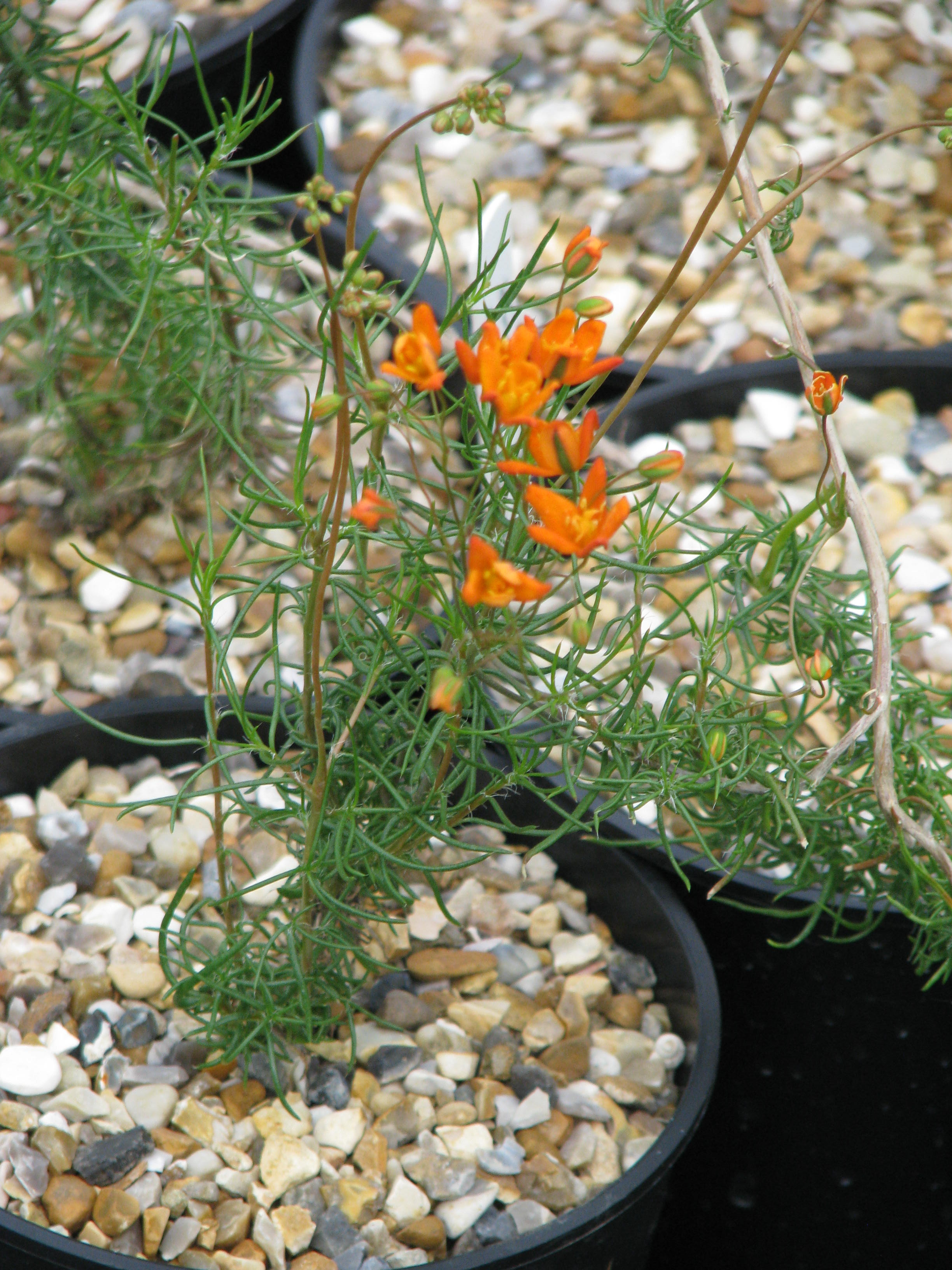
- Pharnaceum aurantium

Scientific classification
- Kingdom: Plantae
- Clade: Tracheophytes
- Clade: Angiosperms
- Clade: Eudicots
- Order: Caryophyllales
- Family: Molluginaceae
- Genus: Pharnaceum; L.

Species
- See text

Synonyms
- Ginginsia DC.

= Pharnaceum =

Genus of flowering plants

Pharnaceum is a genus of flowering plants in the family Molluginaceae, found in southern Africa. Some are annual or perennial herbs, others are shrubs or subshrubs.

== Species ==
Currently accepted species include:

- Pharnaceum albens L.f.
- Pharnaceum alpinum Adamson
- Pharnaceum aurantium (DC.) Druce
- Pharnaceum brevicaule (DC.) Bartl.
- Pharnaceum ciliare Adamson
- Pharnaceum confertum (DC.) Eckl. & Zeyh.
- Pharnaceum cordifolium L.
- Pharnaceum croceum E.Mey. ex Fenzl
- Pharnaceum detonsum Fenzl
- Pharnaceum dichotomum L.f.
- Pharnaceum elongatum (DC.) Adamson
- Pharnaceum exiguum Adamson
- Pharnaceum fluviale Eckl. & Zeyh.
- Pharnaceum gracile Fenzl
- Pharnaceum incanum L.
- Pharnaceum lanatum Bartl.
- Pharnaceum lanuginosum J.C.Manning & Goldblatt
- Pharnaceum lineare L.f.
- Pharnaceum microphyllum L.f.
- Pharnaceum rubens Adamson
- Pharnaceum serpyllifolium L.f.
- Pharnaceum subtile E.Mey. ex Fenzl
- Pharnaceum thunbergii Adamson
- Pharnaceum trigonum Eckl. & Zeyh.
- Pharnaceum viride Adamson
