= Paramollugo =

Scientific classification
- Kingdom: Plantae
- Clade: Tracheophytes
- Clade: Angiosperms
- Clade: Eudicots
- Order: Caryophyllales
- Family: Molluginaceae
- Genus: Paramollugo; Thulin

Genus of plants

Paramollugo is a genus of flowering plants belonging to the family Molluginaceae.

Its native range is Caribbean to Guyana, Tropical and Subtropical Old World.

Species:

- Paramollugo angustifolia (M.G.Gilbert & Thulin) Thulin
- Paramollugo cuneifolia (Griseb.) Thulin
- Paramollugo decandra (Scott Elliot) Thulin
- Paramollugo deltoidea (León) Thulin
- Paramollugo digyna (Montrouz.) Sukhor.
- Paramollugo elliotii Sukhor.
- Paramollugo nudicaulis (Lam.) Thulin
- Paramollugo simulans Sukhor.
- Paramollugo spathulata (Sw.) Sukhor.
