= Polpoda =

Scientific classification
- Kingdom: Plantae
- Clade: Tracheophytes
- Clade: Angiosperms
- Clade: Eudicots
- Order: Caryophyllales
- Family: Molluginaceae
- Genus: Polpoda; C.Presl

Genus of plants

Polpoda is a genus of flowering plants belonging to the family Molluginaceae.

Its native range is South African Republic.

Species:

- Polpoda capensis C.Presl
- Polpoda stipulacea (F.M.Leight.) Adamson
