= Trigastrotheca (plant) =

Scientific classification
- Kingdom: Plantae
- Clade: Tracheophytes
- Clade: Angiosperms
- Clade: Eudicots
- Order: Caryophyllales
- Family: Molluginaceae
- Genus: Trigastrotheca; F.Muell.

Genus of flowering plants

Trigastrotheca is a genus of flowering plants belonging to the family Molluginaceae.

Its native range is Tropical and Subtropical Asia to Pacific.

Species:

- Trigastrotheca molluginea F.Muell.
- Trigastrotheca pentaphylla (L.) Thulin
- Trigastrotheca rupestris (T.Cooke) Sukhor.
- Trigastrotheca stricta (L.) Thulin
