= Lophiocarpus =

Scientific classification
- Kingdom: Plantae
- Clade: Tracheophytes
- Clade: Angiosperms
- Clade: Eudicots
- Order: Caryophyllales
- Family: Lophiocarpaceae
- Genus: Lophiocarpus; Turcz.

Genus of plants

Lophiocarpus is a genus of flowering plants belonging to the family Lophiocarpaceae.

Its native range is Southern Tropical and Southern Africa.

Species:

- Lophiocarpus dinteri Engl.
- Lophiocarpus latifolius Nowicke
- Lophiocarpus polystachyus Turcz.
- Lophiocarpus tenuissimus Hook.f.
