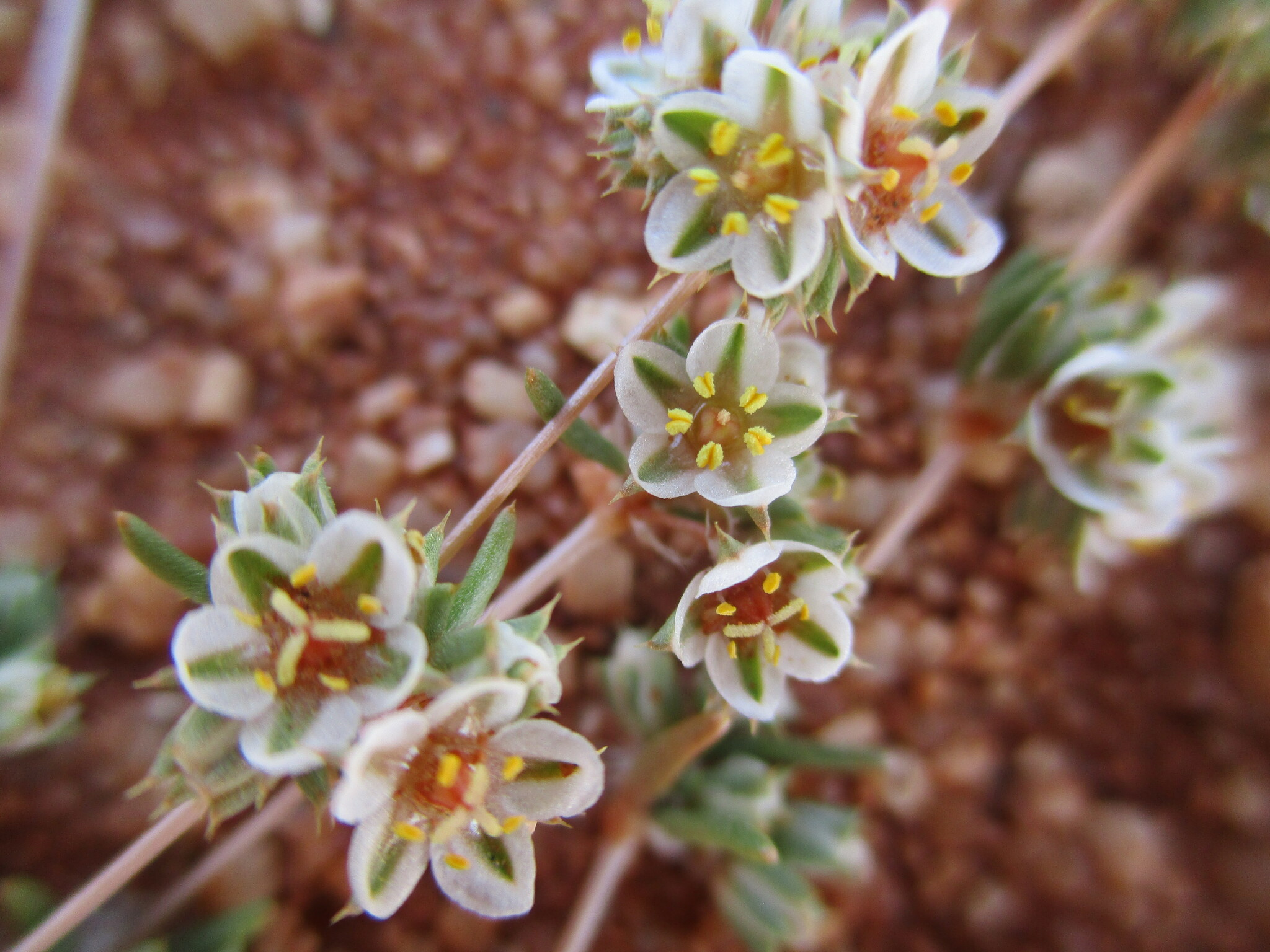
- Suessenguthiella scleranthoides

Scientific classification
- Kingdom: Plantae
- Clade: Tracheophytes
- Clade: Angiosperms
- Clade: Eudicots
- Order: Caryophyllales
- Family: Molluginaceae
- Genus: Suessenguthiella; Friedrich

= Suessenguthiella =

Genus of plants

Suessenguthiella is a genus of plant in family Molluginaceae.

== Selected species ==
The genus contains the following species (but this list may be incomplete):

- Suessenguthiella caespitosa Friedrich
- Suessenguthiella scleranthoides (Sond.) Friedrich
