= Coelanthum =

Scientific classification
- Kingdom: Plantae
- Clade: Tracheophytes
- Clade: Angiosperms
- Clade: Eudicots
- Order: Caryophyllales
- Family: Molluginaceae
- Genus: Coelanthum; E.Mey. ex Fenzl

Genus of flowering plants

Coelanthum is a genus of flowering plants belonging to the family Molluginaceae.

Its native range is Southern Africa.

Species:

- Coelanthum grandiflorum E.Mey. ex Fenzl
- Coelanthum semiquinquefidum (Hook.) Druce
- Coelanthum verticillatum Adamson
