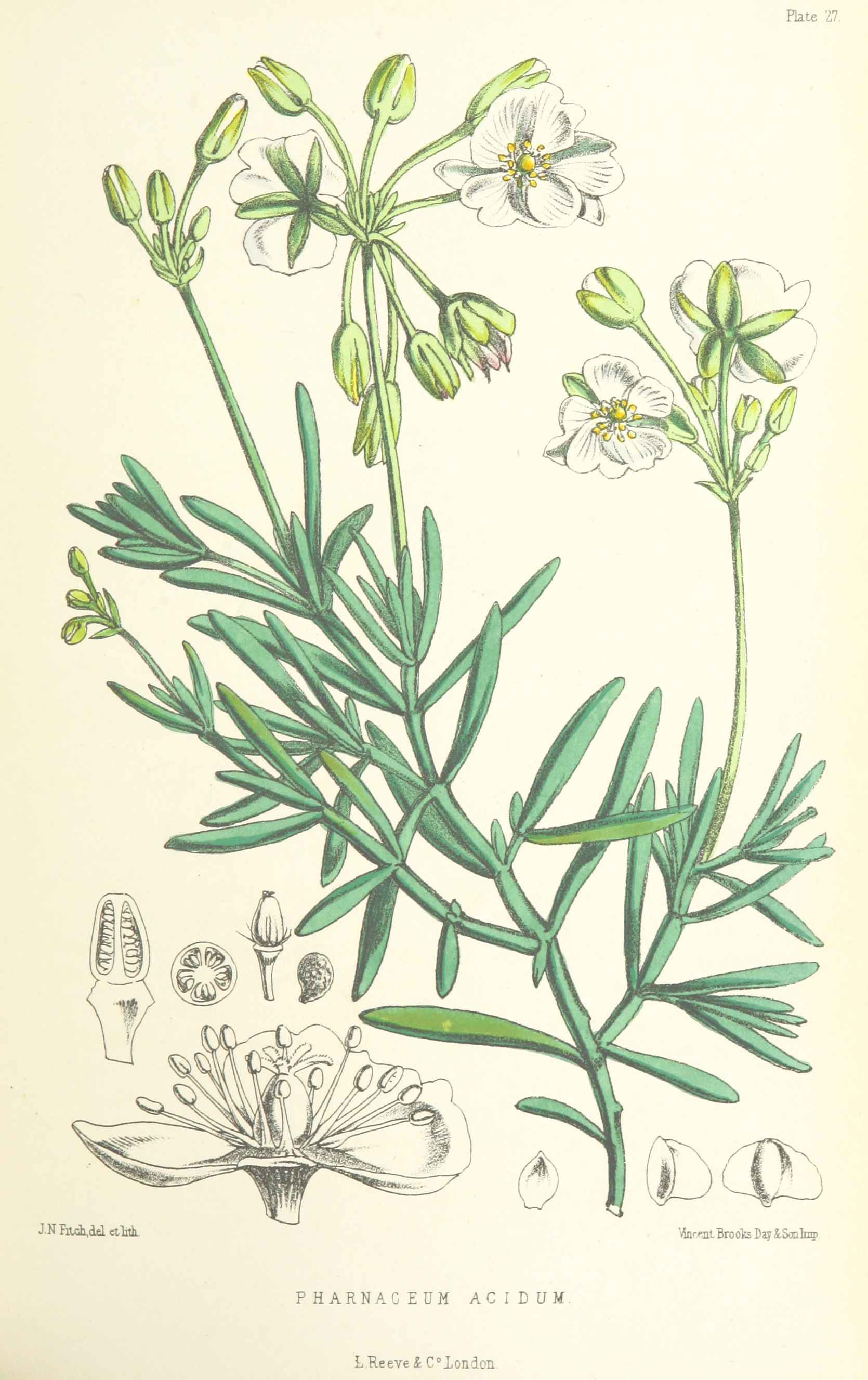
- Kewa acida

Scientific classification
- Kingdom: Plantae
- Clade: Tracheophytes
- Clade: Angiosperms
- Clade: Eudicots
- Order: Caryophyllales
- Family: Kewaceae; Christenh.
- Genus: Kewa; Christenh.

Species
- See text
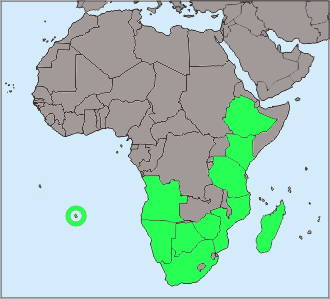
- Distribution of Kewa species by country

= Kewa (plant) =

Genus of flowering plants

Kewa is a genus of flowering plants, consisting of eight species of succulent sub-woody plants, native to eastern and southern Africa, including Saint Helena and Madagascar. These are small shrubs or herbs that form cushions and have edible, acid-tasting leaves. Kewa is the only genus in the family Kewaceae.

The species were formerly included in the genus Hypertelis of the family Molluginaceae, but molecular studies have shown that most species did not belong there, but were rather distantly related to Molluginaceae, being placed in a clade comprising Aizoaceae, Gisekiaceae and Barbeuiaceae. Only the type species Hypertelis spergulacea remains in Molluginaceae; all others are transferred to the genus Kewa, which was named for Kew, where the Royal Botanic Gardens, Kew are situated.

== Species ==
Species transferred to Kewa from Hypertelis in 2014 were:

- Kewa acida (Hook.f.) Christenh. – Saint Helena
- Kewa angrae-pequenae (Friedrich) Christenh. – Namibia, South Africa
- Kewa arenicola (Sond.) Christenh. – South Africa
- Kewa bowkeriana (Sond.) Christenh. – Ethiopia, Kenya, Tanzania, Mozambique, Zimbabwe, Botswana, Namibia, South Africa
- Kewa caespitosa (Friedrich) Christenh. – Namibia, South Africa
- Kewa salsoloides (Burch.) Christenh. – Mozambique, Angola, Namibia, South Africa
- Kewa suffruticosa (Baker) Christenh. – Madagascar
- Kewa trachysperma (Adamson) Christenh. – South Africa

== Cultivation ==
Plants are perennial but relatively short lived. They can easily be propagated from seed and make attractive cushion-like shrubs with leathery leaves and many starry white flowers.
