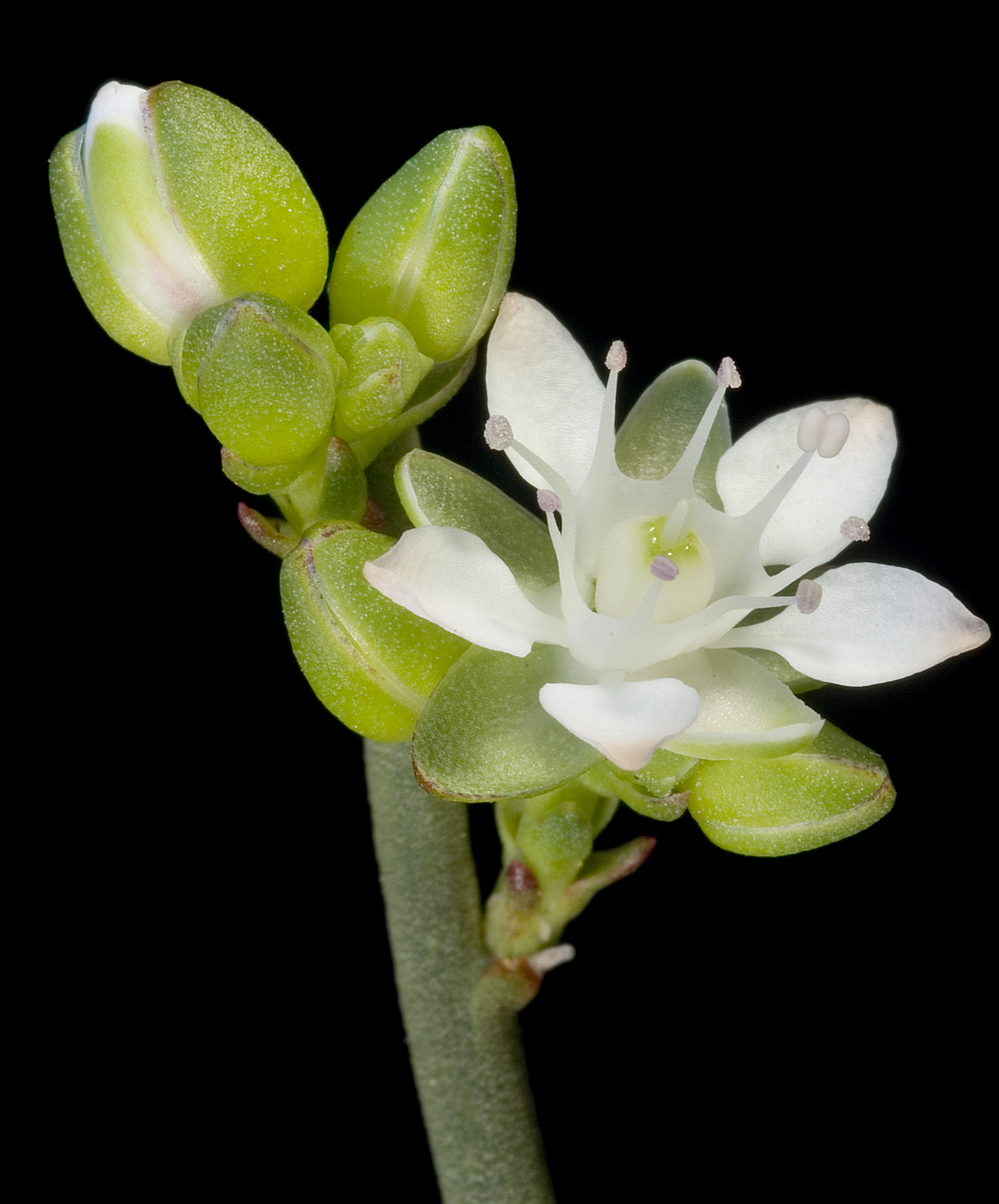

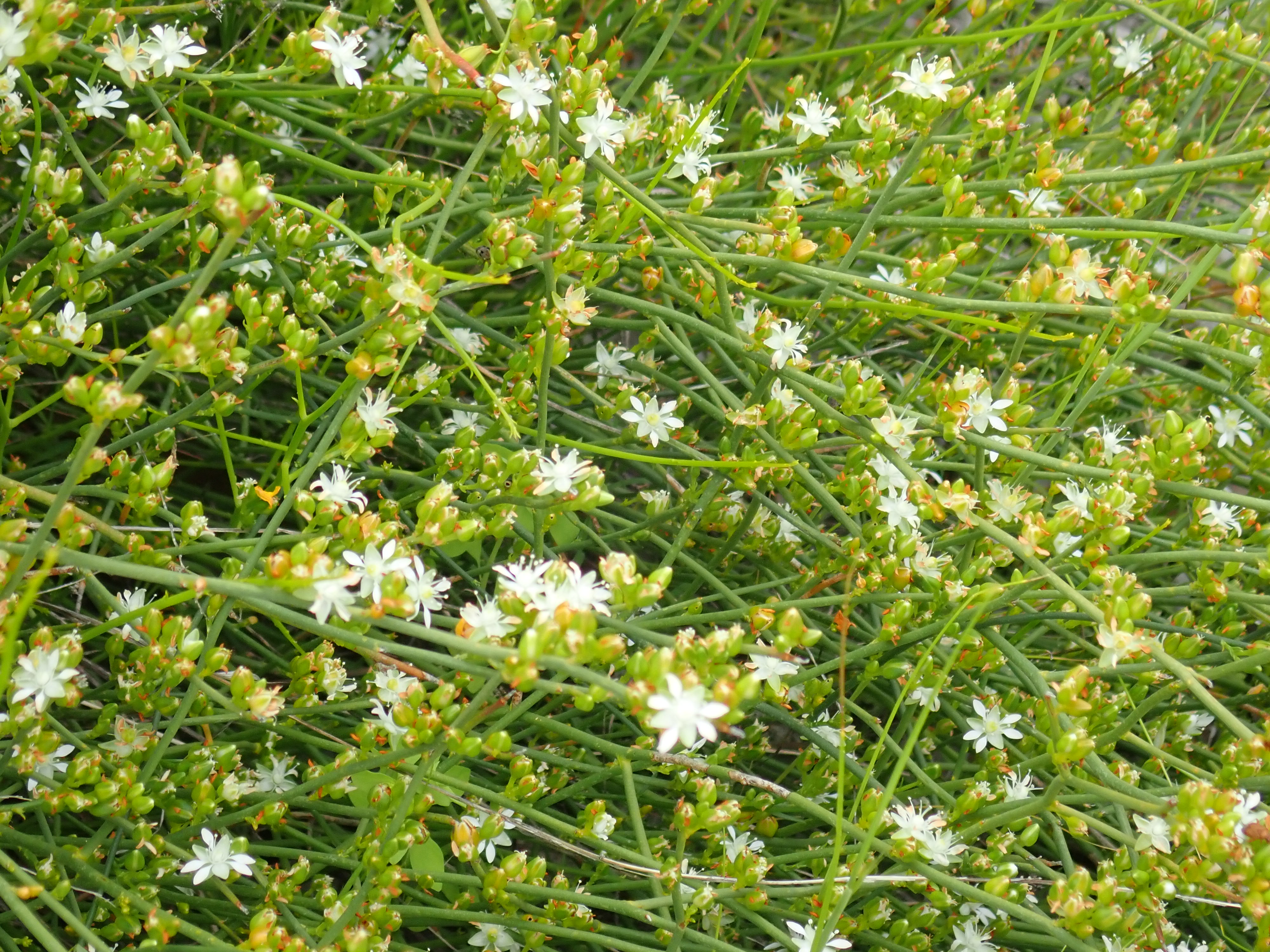

Scientific classification
- Kingdom: Plantae
- Clade: Tracheophytes
- Clade: Angiosperms
- Clade: Eudicots
- Order: Caryophyllales
- Family: Macarthuriaceae
- Genus: Macarthuria
- Species: M. australis

Binomial name
- Macarthuria australis Hügel ex Endl.
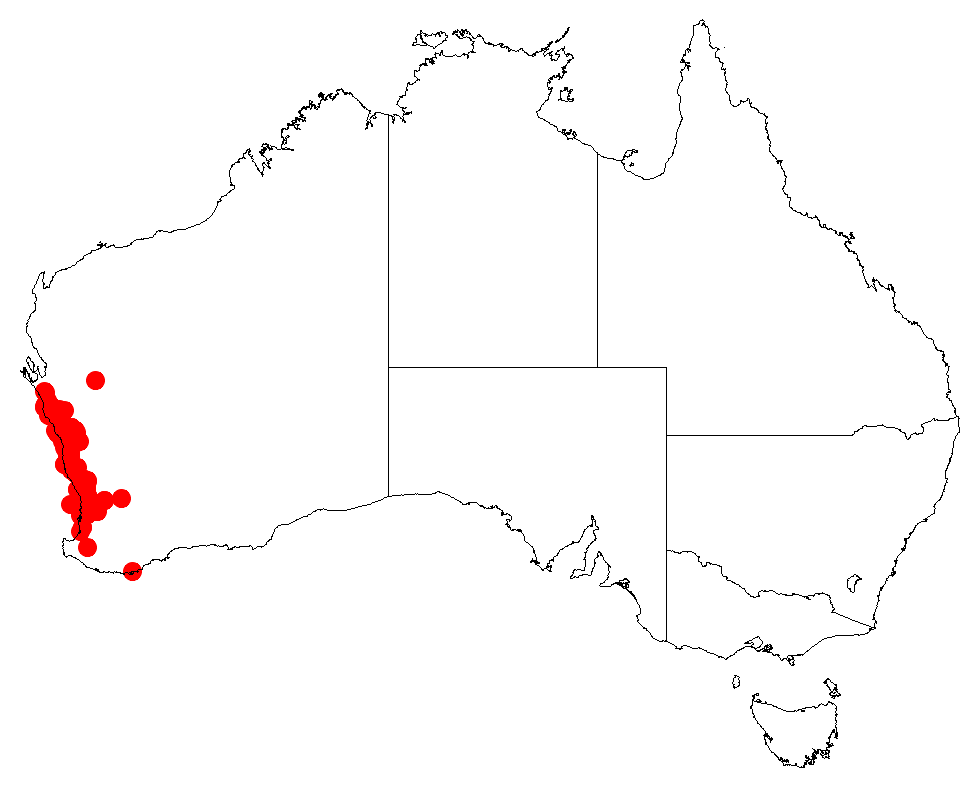
- Occurrence data from the AVH

= Macarthuria australis =

Species of shrub

Macarthuria australis is an erect or spreading, wiry shrub, in the family Macarthuriaceae endemic to Western Australia. It grows from 0.15-0.75 m high and has white/white-cream flowers, and may be seen in flower from May to February although mainly from August to September. It grows on sand and laterite, on coastal sandplains, sandhills, and roadsides.

== Ecology ==
The seeds are dispersed by ants.
