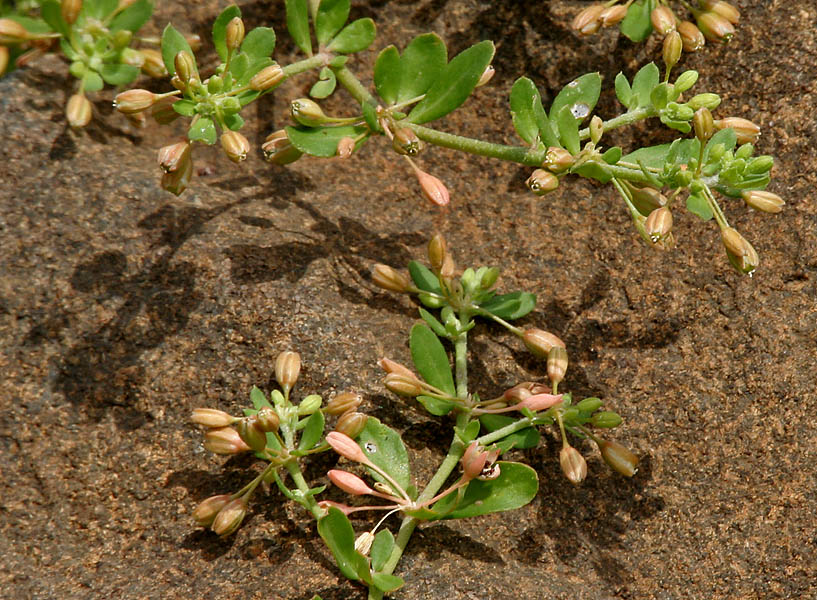
- Glinus oppositifolius at Pocharam lake, Andhra Pradesh, India.

Scientific classification
- Kingdom: Plantae
- Clade: Tracheophytes
- Clade: Angiosperms
- Clade: Eudicots
- Order: Caryophyllales
- Family: Molluginaceae
- Genus: Glinus; L.

Species
- 6 - 12, see text

= Glinus =

Genus of plants

Glinus is a genus of tropical and subtropical plants in the family Molluginaceae. Plants of this genus are sometimes called sweetjuice. They are squat annual herbs with fuzzy to hairy green herbage. The fruit is a capsule containing many kidney-shaped seeds. Some species are used as herbal remedies and some are eaten as food.

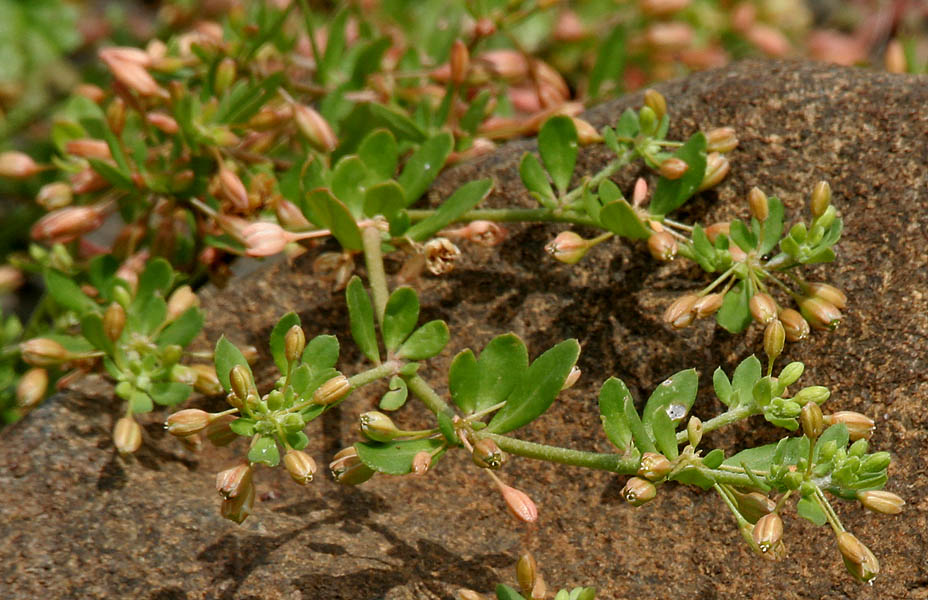
Glinus oppositifolius at Pocharam lake, Andhra Pradesh, India.

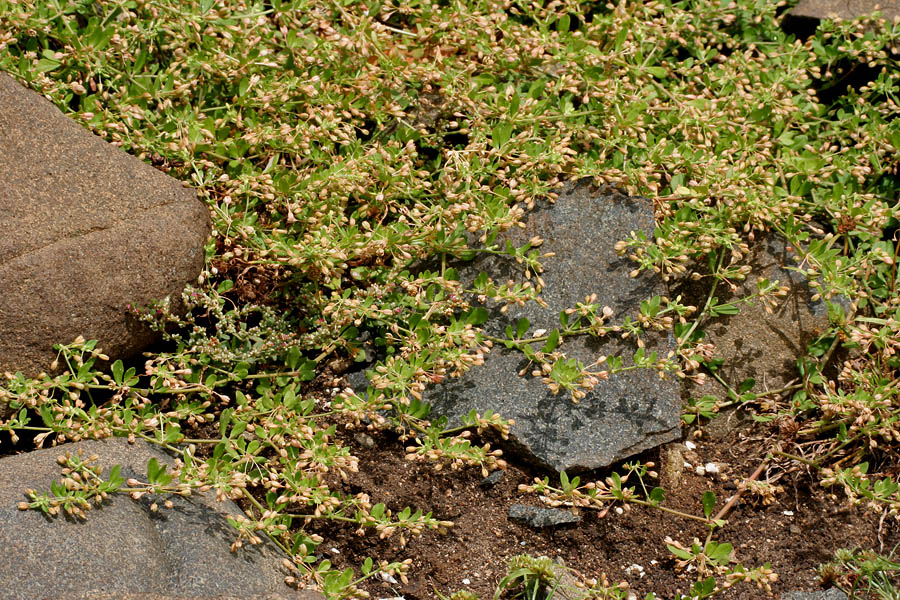
Glinus oppositifolius at Pocharam lake, Andhra Pradesh, India.

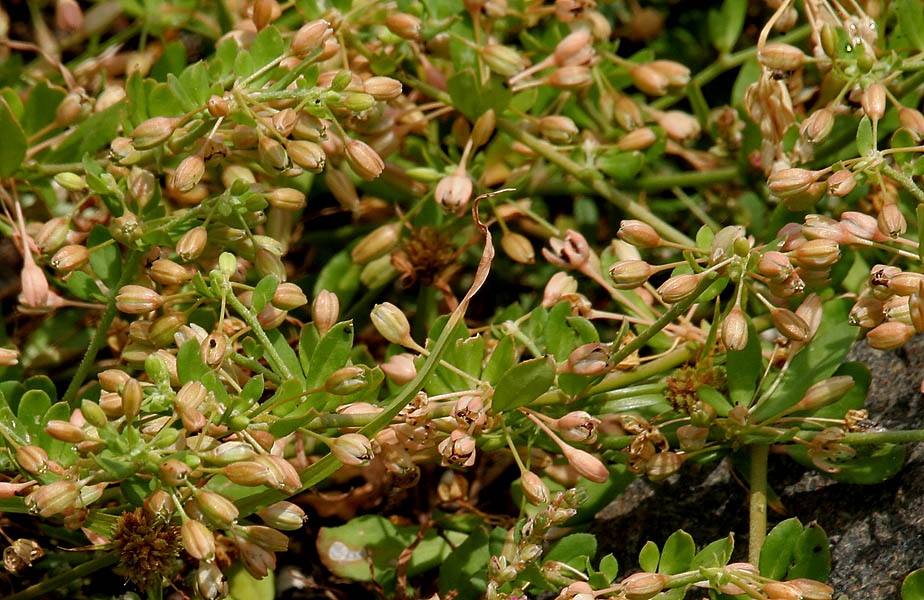
Glinus oppositifolius at Pocharam lake, Andhra Pradesh, India.

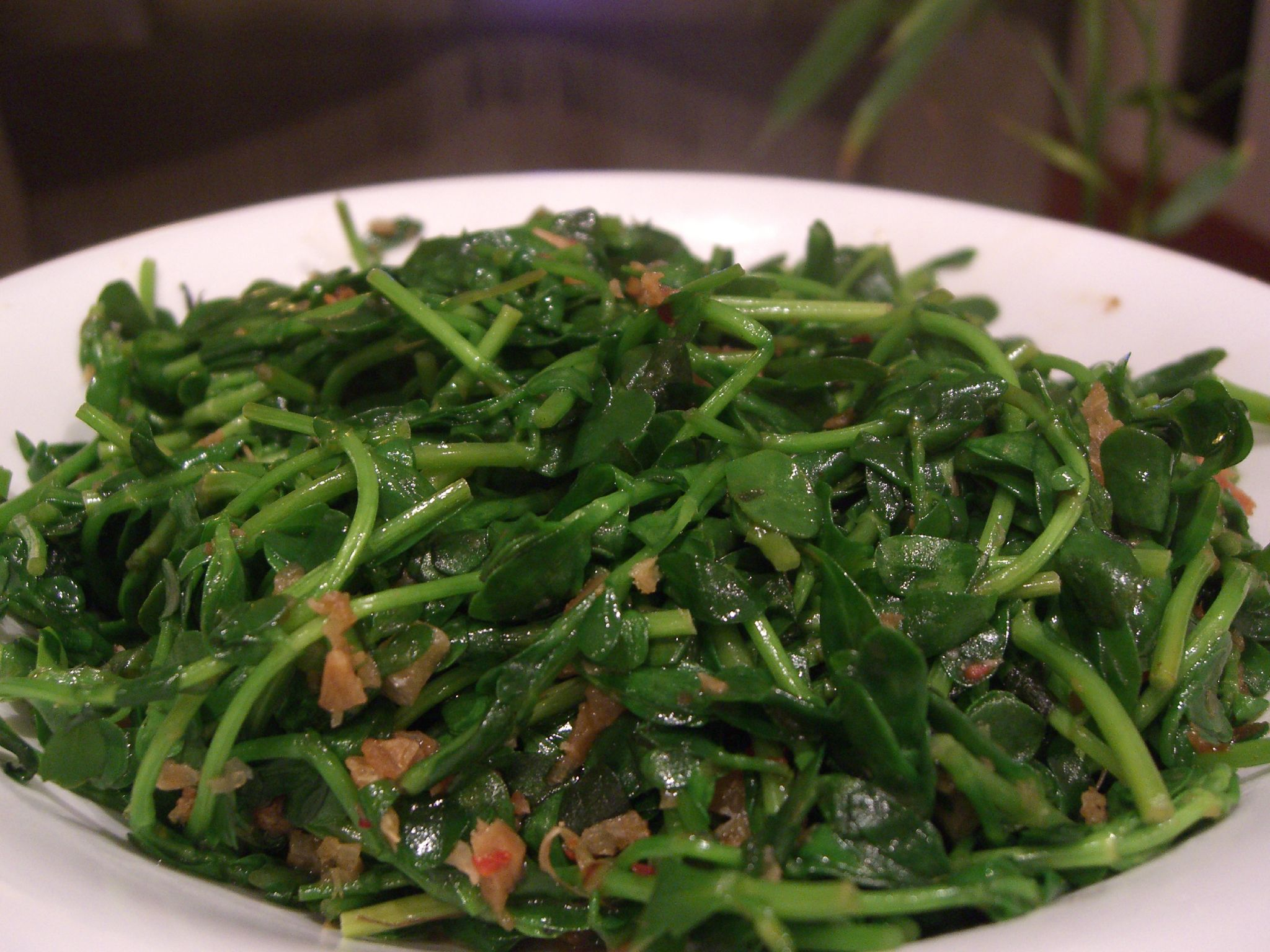
Glinus oppositifolius (Rau Dang) stir fried with Sambal Belacan

== Selected species ==
- Glinus herniarioides
- Glinus lotoides
- Glinus oppositifolius
- Glinus radiatus
