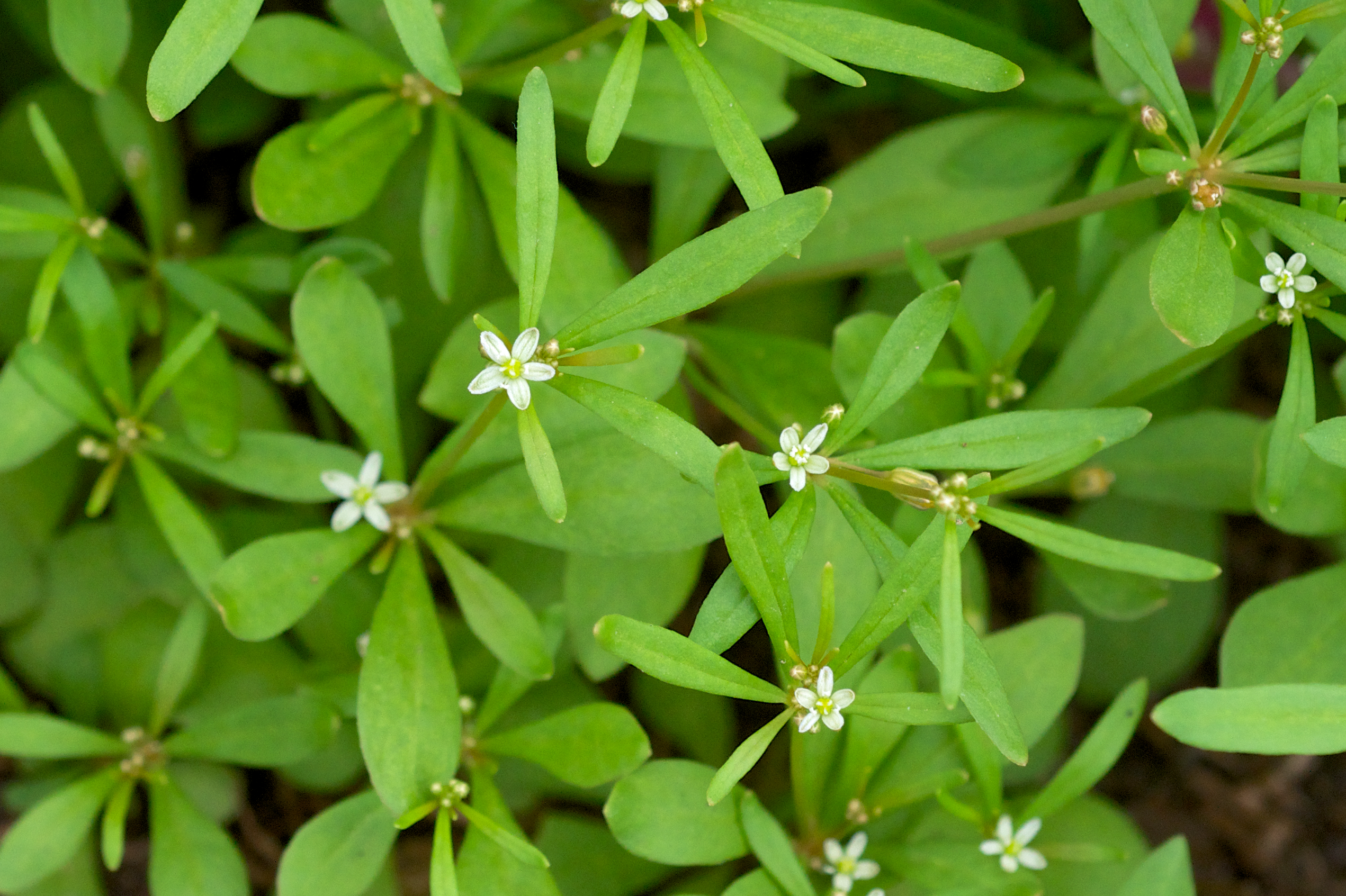

Conservation status
- Secure (NatureServe)

Scientific classification
- Kingdom: Plantae
- Clade: Tracheophytes
- Clade: Angiosperms
- Clade: Eudicots
- Order: Caryophyllales
- Family: Molluginaceae
- Genus: Mollugo
- Species: M. verticillata

Binomial name
- Mollugo verticillata L.

Synonyms
- List: Mollugo arenaria Kunth; Mollugo axillaris Schltdl. ex Rohrb.; Mollugo berteroana Ser.; Mollugo chevalieri Hutch. & Dalziel; Mollugo costata Y.T.Chang & Wei; Mollugo dichotoma Schrank; Mollugo diffusa Willd. ex Steud.; Mollugo hoffmannseggiana Ser.; Mollugo juncea Fenzl; Mollugo schrankii Ser.; Mollugo spergulifolia Willd. ex Steud.; Mollugo verticillata var. latifolia Fenzl; Mollugo verticillata lusus linearis (Fenzl) Rohrb.; Mollugo verticillata var. linearis Fenzl; Mollugo verticillata var. longifolia Cambess.; Mollugo verticillata var. scrobiculata Cambess.; Mollugo verticillata subsp. subsessile Beauverd & Felipp.; Mollugo verticillata var. vulgaris Cambess.; Pharnaceum arenarium (Kunth) Spreng.; Pharnaceum berteroanum Spreng.; Pharnaceum galioides Willd. ex Schult.; Pharnaceum hoffmannseggianum Schult.; Pharnaceum lineare Bertero ex Rohrb.; Pharnaceum verticillatum (L.) Spreng.

= Mollugo verticillata =

Species of flowering plant

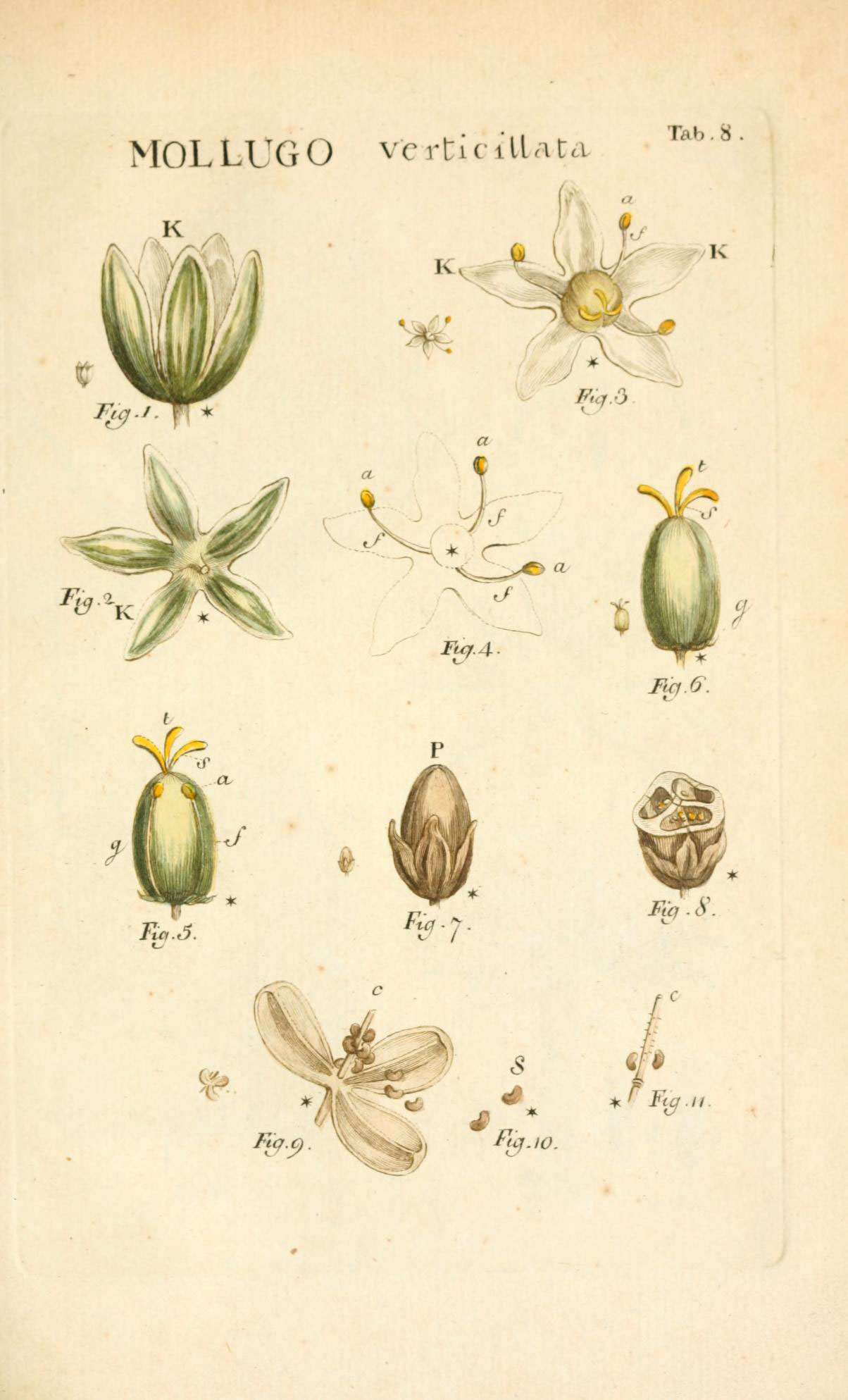
Illustratio systematis sexualis Linnaeani (Tab. 8) (6059106317)

Mollugo verticillata, the green carpetweed (also known as Indian chickweed), is a rapidly spreading annual plant from tropical America. In eastern North America, it is a common weed growing in disturbed areas. It forms a prostrate circular mat that can quickly climb over nearby plants and obstacles. The species has been reported from every state in the United States except Alaska, Hawaii, and Utah, as well as from British Columbia, Manitoba. Ontario, Quebec, New Brunswick and Nova Scotia. Although considered an invasive weed, M. verticillata is also known to be edible. Archaeological evidence has shown that M. verticillata has been in North America for about 3000 years. Sometimes also referred to as "Indian chickweed", in China this plant is referred to as zhong leng su mi cao.

== Description ==
Carpetweed has narrow, whorled leaves, 3-8 at each node. At maturity the plant may lose its characteristic basal rosette formation. Leaves are approximately 1–3 cm in length and possess an obovate shape. Leaf apex may vary from rounded to acute. Due to its habit of prostrate growth, the plant will grow and sprawl across the soil and form mats. The flowers are usually in clusters of 2-5, blooming from July through September. Flowers are white or greenish white with tiny 5–15 mm stalks. Flowers quickly turn into fruit that is egg shaped and 1.5–4 mm in length. The dehiscent capsule opens at maturity. The seeds are 0.5 mm long and are red to rusty brown in coloration.

== Taxonomy ==
Advances in molecular genetic sequencing have improved understanding of the taxonomic relationship in the family Molluginaceae, which had previously not been as inclusive. Genera from Molluginaceae had previously been placed under Aizoaceae, Nyctaginaceae, and Phytolaccaceae before recent studies. The genus Mollugo L. currently comprises about 35 species of annual herbs. Several subtaxa species of M. verticillata have been reported due to its varying morphological nature; however, they are not thoroughly documented. Mollugo verticillata has many accepted synonyms, including Mollugo dichotoma, Mollugo diffusa, Mollugo costata, Pharnaceum arenarium, and Pharnaceum verticellatum. It is also referred to as alfombra in Spanish and mollugine in French. Other closely related sister taxa include Mollugo floriana, Mollugo flavescens, Mollugo snodgrassii, Mollugo crockeri, and Mollugo enneandra.

== Distribution and habitat ==
The wide range of M. verticillata is apparent across North America, Brazil, Colombia, Mexico, West Indies, Central America, South America, Eurasia and Africa. There is agreement among some studies that the carpetweed originated in the New World tropics and spread into more temperate zones. Overall the place of origin has been attributed to the tropics or subtropics of the northern and southern hemispheres. It is commonly found in warm and/or wet environments across North America.

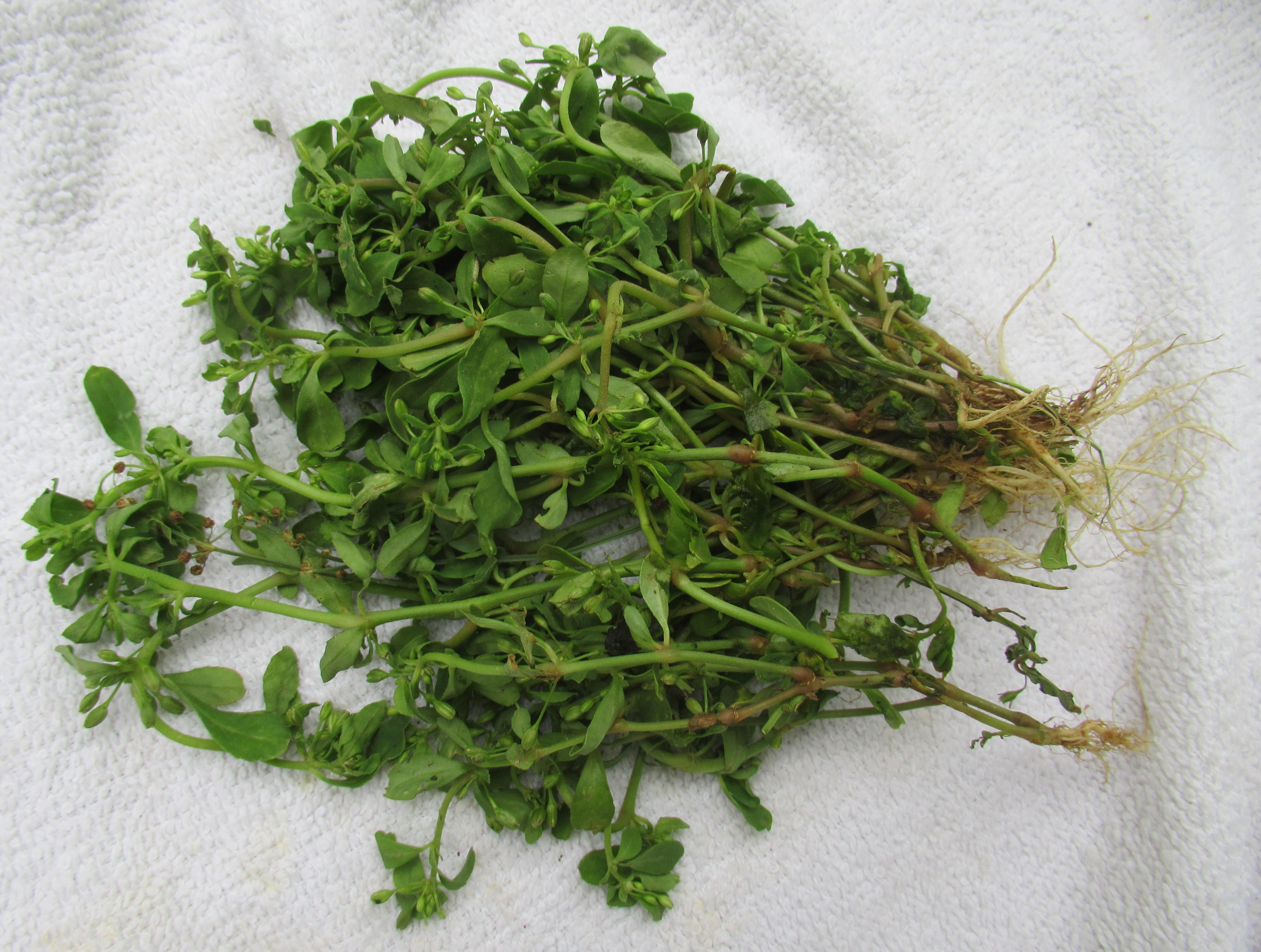
Green carpetweed Molluginaceae Sarsalida Papait

== Uses ==
Along with Glinus (Molluginaceae), Mollugo are edible plants that have historically been utilized as vegetables or for medicinal benefits. The family Molluginaceae has been studied for its therapeutic characteristics due to the production of triterpenes saponins and flavonoids. One study suggested that ethanolic extracts of M. verticillata could be a potential immunomodulator. The chemical makeup in members of the family Molluginaceae in general has anti-fungal and anti-inflammatory properties.

== Ethnobotany ==
Carbon dating has dated seeds of M. verticillata found in Icehouse Bottom Tennessee back to 1170- 140 B.C. Other seeds found in Troyville, Louisiana were dated back to 500 A.D. It is unsure exactly when or how M. verticillata spread into temperate North America. European movements were not the cause of this migration because carbon dating reveals that the plant was in the Little Tennessee river valley 3000 years ago. Despite little apparent food value, indigenous peoples may have had uses of M. verticillata that are unclear today. Carpetweed, also referred to as "Indian chickweed", was utilized as a potherb by the indigenous peoples of Southern Appalachia.

== Conservation status ==
Carpetweed is considered to be globally secure. It is also credited as an invasive weed by USDA.gov. IUCN RedList states that the taxon has not been assessed for the IUCN Red List. Other accounts cite the weed as being native to the Continental US, Caribbean territories, Mexico and introduced to Canada. It can be found in disturbed habitats such as fields, parking lots and gardens.
