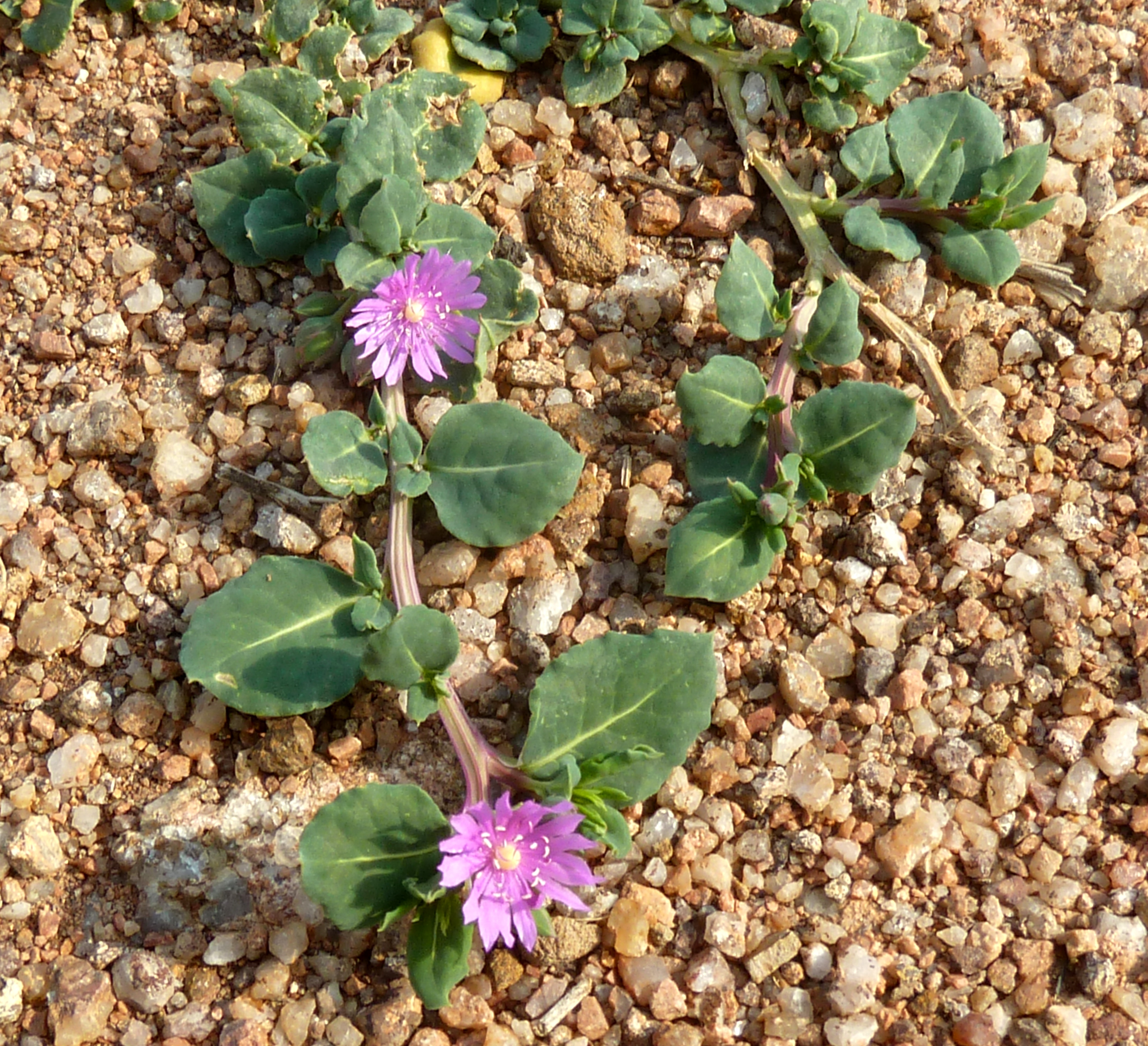
- Corbichonia decumbens

Scientific classification
- Kingdom: Plantae
- Clade: Tracheophytes
- Clade: Angiosperms
- Clade: Eudicots
- Order: Caryophyllales
- Family: Lophiocarpaceae; Doweld & Reveal

Genera
- Corbichonia; Lophiocarpus

= Lophiocarpaceae =

Family of plants

The Lophiocarpaceae are a family of flowering plants comprising mostly succulent subshrubs and herbaceous species native to tropical to southern sub-Saharan Africa to western India. It includes the genera Corbichonia and Lophiocarpus. The family is newly recognized through research by the Angiosperm Phylogeny Group III system to deal with long-standing phylogenetic difficulties in placing various genera within the Caryophyllales.
