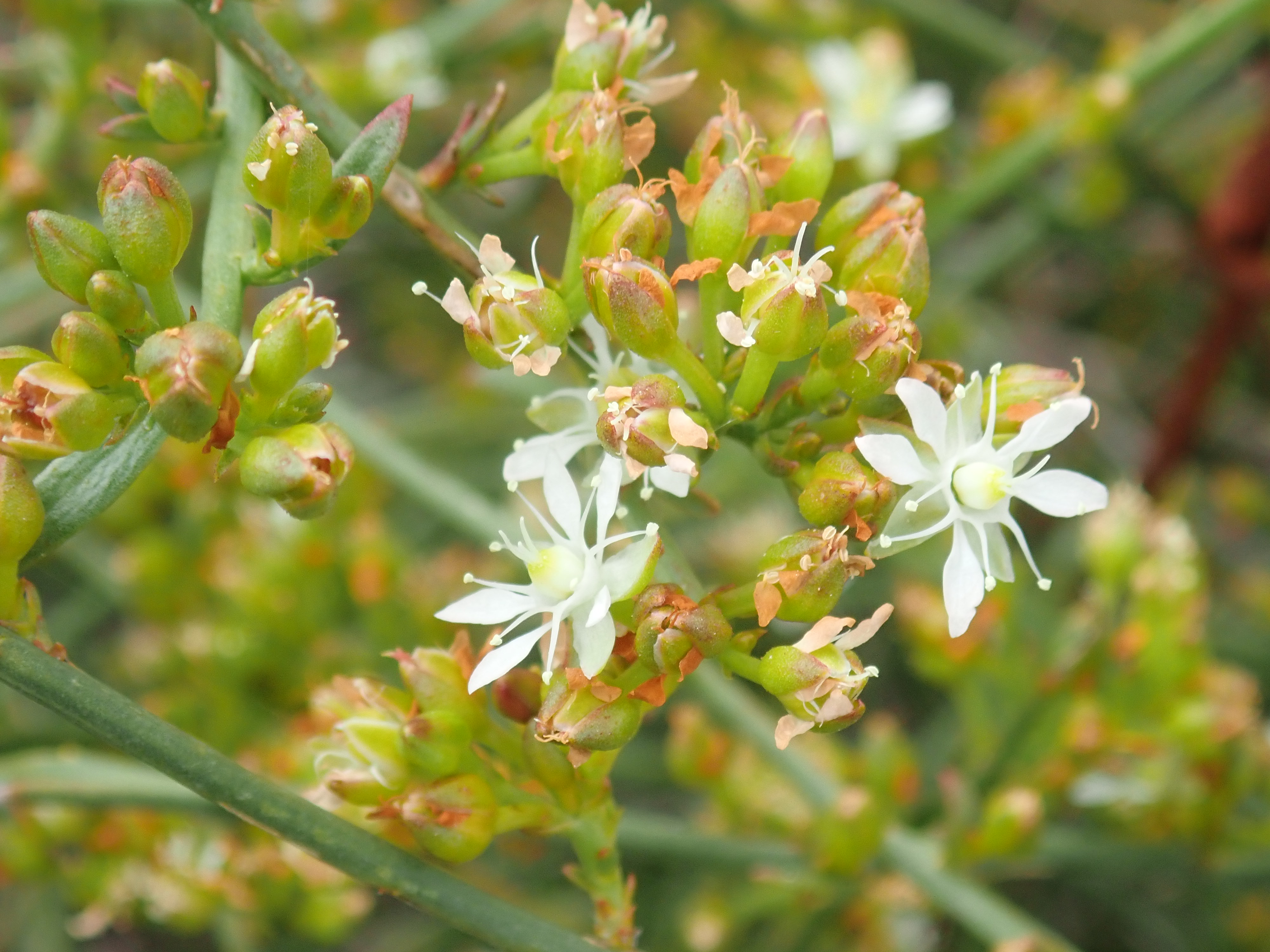
- Macarthuria australis

Scientific classification
- Kingdom: Plantae
- Clade: Tracheophytes
- Clade: Angiosperms
- Clade: Eudicots
- Order: Caryophyllales
- Family: Macarthuriaceae
- Genus: Macarthuria; Hugel ex Endl.

Type species
- Macarthuria australis

Diversity
- About 9 species

= Macarthuria =

Genus of flowering plants

Macarthuria is a genus of dicotyledonous plants belonging to the family Macarthuriaceae, and consists of about 9 species which are endemic to Australia.

== Description ==
Plants in the genus, Macarthuria, are rigid or wiry herbs or subshrubs. The leaves are usually basal, with short petioles, with leaves on the stems being alternate and reduced to scales. The flowers are small and have stems. The outer perianth whorl is 5-partite and persists persistent, and the inner perianth is 5-lobed and petaloid, or absent. The flowers have 8 stamens whose filaments are united at the base. The ovary is 3-locular and superior, with each locule having 1-3 ovules. There are three styles and the placentation is basal. The fruit is a capsule and dehisces in 3 valves. The seeds have arils.

== Accepted species ==
(according to Plants of the World Online)
Macarthuria apetala Harv.
Macarthuria australis Hügel ex Endl.
Macarthuria complanata E.M.Ross
Macarthuria ephedroides C.T.White
Macarthuria georgeana Keighery
Macarthuria intricata Keighery
Macarthuria keigheryi Lepschi
Macarthuria neocambrica F.Muell.
Macarthuria vertex Lepschi

== Etymology ==
Macarthuria is named to honour Sir William Macarthur (1800 – 1882), son of Captain John Macarthur.
