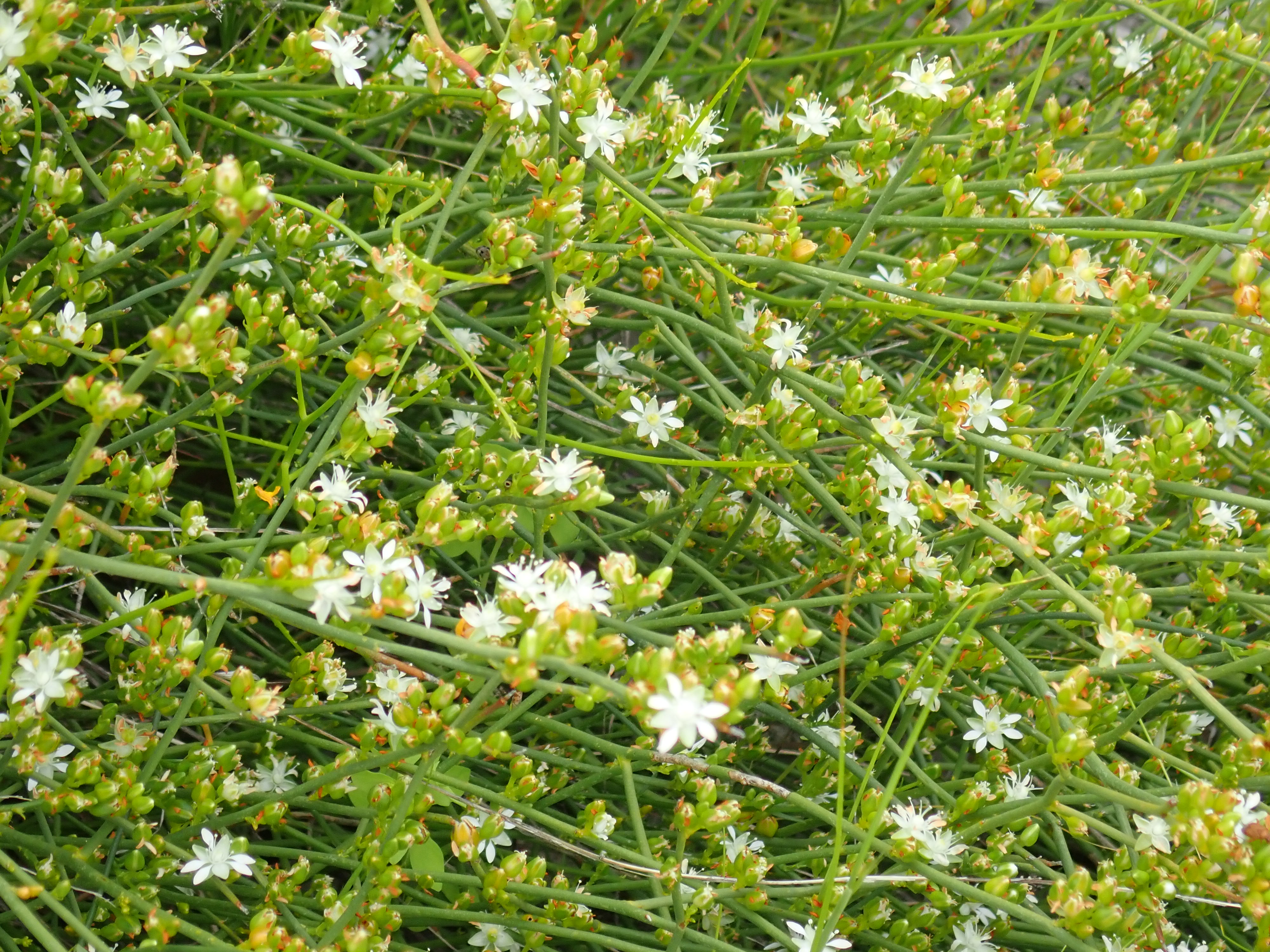

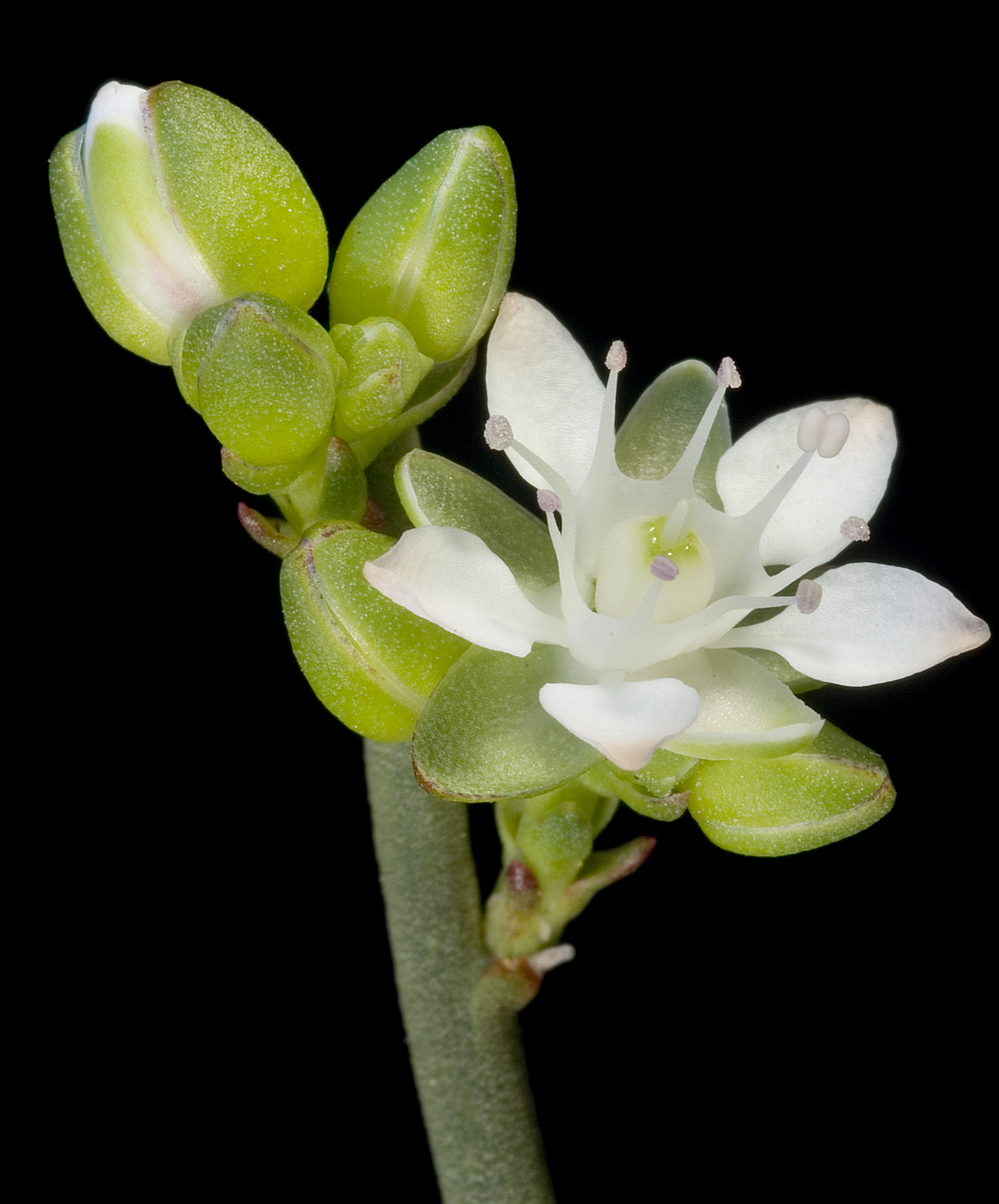
- Macarthuria australis Hügel ex Endl.

Scientific classification
- Kingdom: Plantae
- Clade: Tracheophytes
- Clade: Angiosperms
- Clade: Eudicots
- Order: Caryophyllales
- Family: Macarthuriaceae; Christenh.

Type genus
- Macarthuria Hugel ex Endl.

Genera
- Macarthuria

= Macarthuriaceae =

Family of flowering plants

Macarthuriaceae is a family of plants in the order Caryophyllales and consists of a single genus, Macarthuria.

== Description ==
Macarthuriaceae are rigid or wiry, rush-like herbs or subshrubs with green stems and reduced leaves. The small flowers have five perianth members, sometimes also five "petals", and eight stamens fused at the base.

== Taxonomy ==
In 2009, Macarthuria was placed with Limeum in the Limeaceae, based on its morphology, but at that time no molecular material of Macarthuria had been examined. Prior to this, Endress and Bittrich had placed it in the family Molluginaceae. However, in 2011, molecular evidence was published, showing that Macarthuria is sister to all core Caryophyllales. Thus, Macarthuria needed to be placed in a family of its own, Macarthuriaceae.
