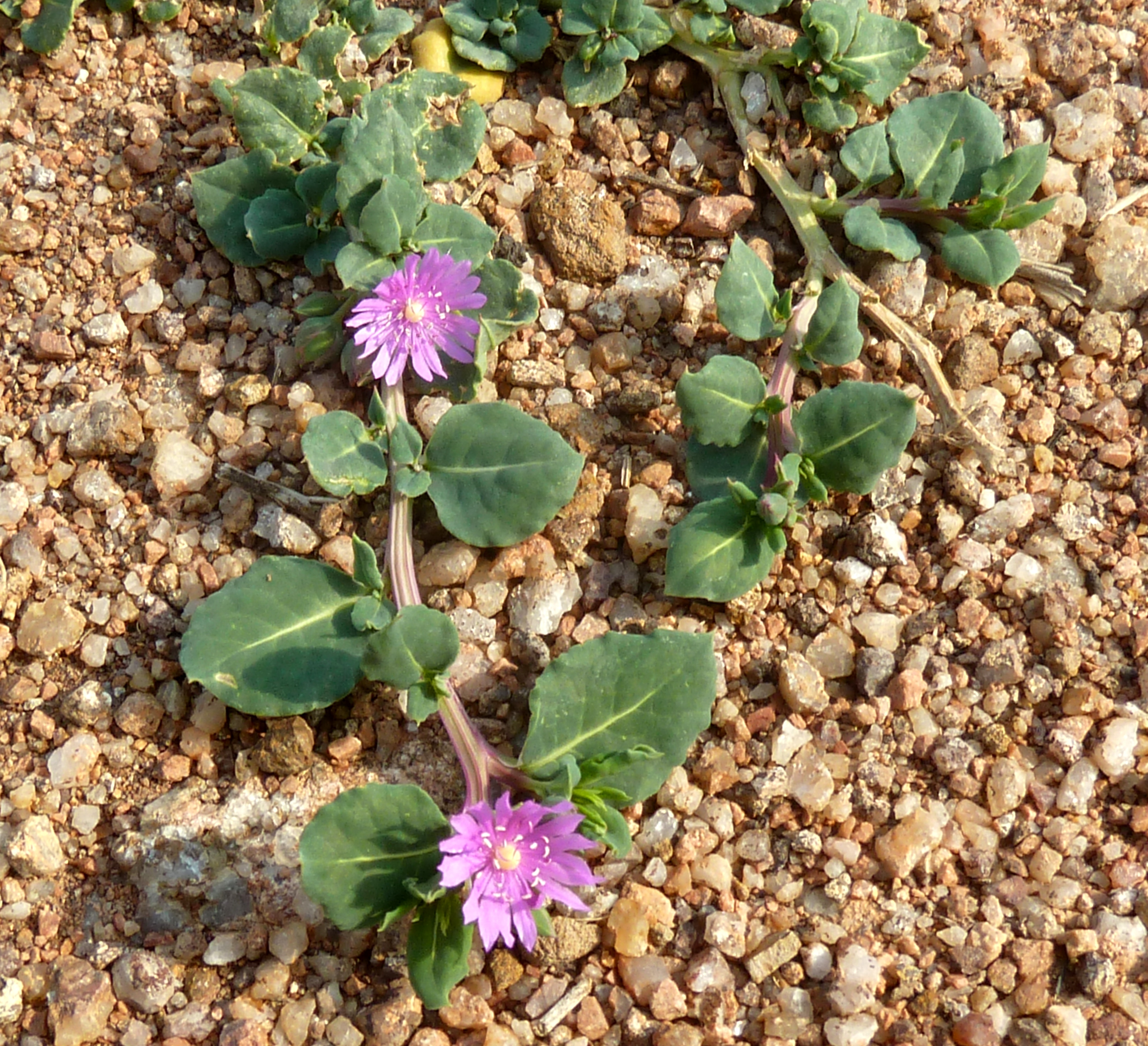
- Corbichonia decumbens

Scientific classification
- Kingdom: Plantae
- Clade: Tracheophytes
- Clade: Angiosperms
- Clade: Eudicots
- Order: Caryophyllales
- Family: Lophiocarpaceae
- Genus: Corbichonia; Scop.

Species
- Corbichonia decumbens; Corbichonia excellii; Corbichonia rubiviolacea

= Corbichonia =

Genus of plant

Corbichonia is a genus of flowering plant in the family Lophiocarpaceae. Since 2016 it is treated under monotypic family Corbichoniaceae.

Species in the genus are seed-bearing, vascular, succulent-type plants.
