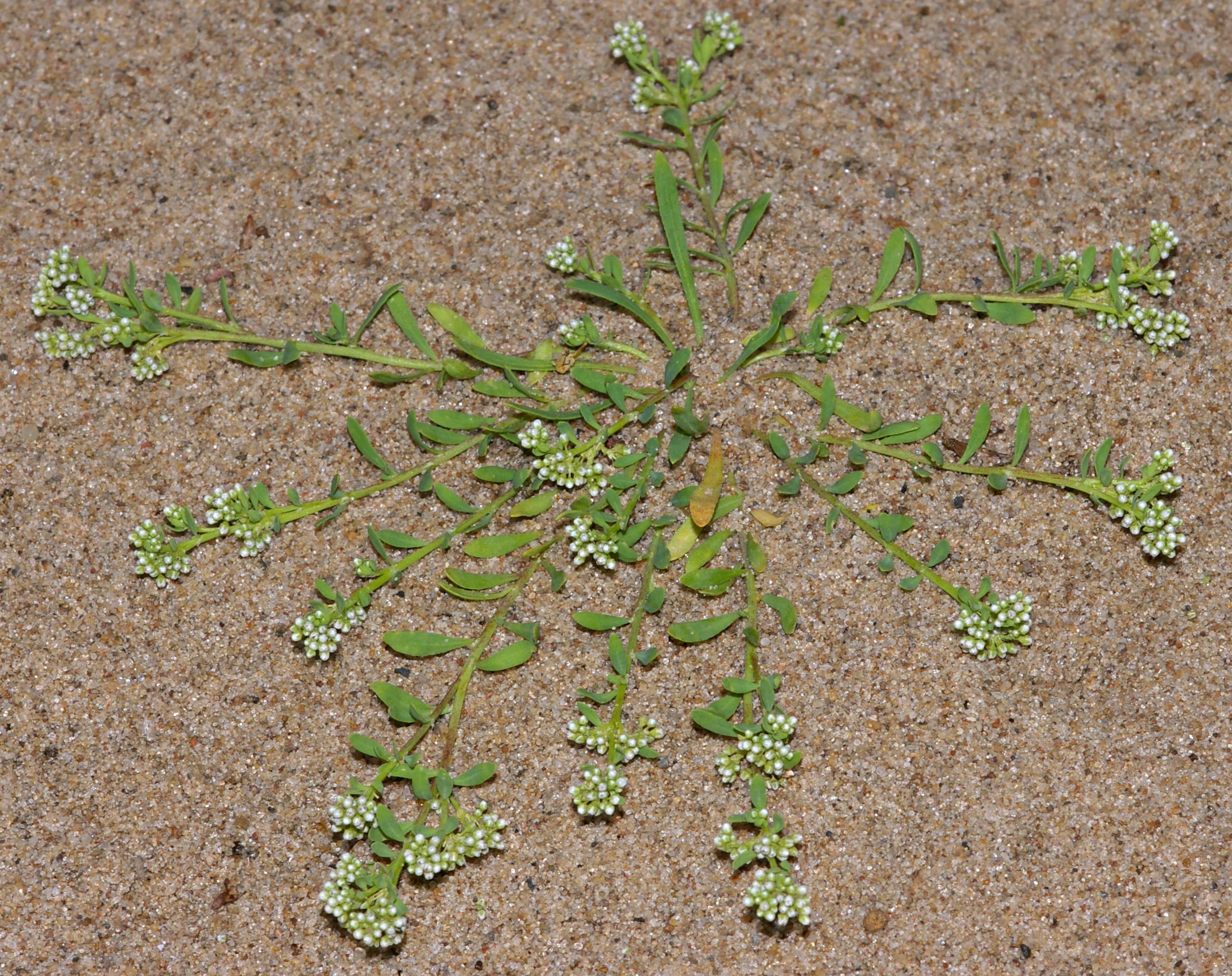
- Corrigiola litoralis

Scientific classification
- Kingdom: Plantae
- Clade: Tracheophytes
- Clade: Angiosperms
- Clade: Eudicots
- Clade: Superasterids
- Order: Caryophyllales
- Family: Caryophyllaceae
- Genus: Corrigiola; L.

Species
- See text

Synonyms
- Polygonifolia Fabr.; Furera Bubani

= Corrigiola =

Genus of flowering plants

Corrigiola, the strapworts, are a genus of flowering plants in the family Caryophyllaceae, with a highly disjunct distribution in Mexico, South America, southern and eastern Africa, Madagascar, northwestern Africa, Europe and western Asia. Together with Telephium they form the tribe Corrigioleae.

== Species ==
Currently accepted species include:

- Corrigiola andina Planch. & Triana
- Corrigiola capensis Willd.
- Corrigiola crassifolia Chaudhri
- Corrigiola drymarioides Baker f.
- Corrigiola litoralis L.
- Corrigiola madagascariensis (Baker) H.Perrier
- Corrigiola palaestina Chaudhri
- Corrigiola paniculata Peter
- Corrigiola propinqua Gay
- Corrigiola squamosa Hook. & Arn.
- Corrigiola telephiifolia Pourr.
- Corrigiola vulcanica Ikonn.
