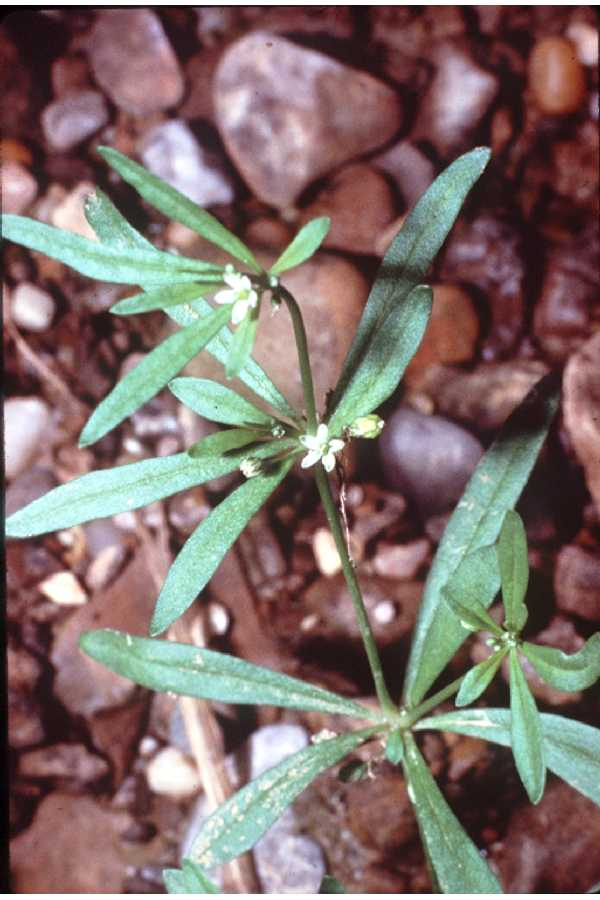
- Mollugo verticillata

Scientific classification
- Kingdom: Plantae
- Clade: Tracheophytes
- Clade: Angiosperms
- Clade: Eudicots
- Order: Caryophyllales
- Family: Molluginaceae
- Genus: Mollugo; L.

Species
- see text

= Mollugo =

Genus of flowering plants

Mollugo is a genus in the flowering plant family Molluginaceae. It comprises a few dozen species of herbaceous plants, including Mollugo verticillata, carpetweed or green carpetweed.

== Selected species ==
- Mollugo cerviana
- Mollugo gracillima
- Mollugo nudicaulis
- Mollugo pentaphylla
- Mollugo verticillata
