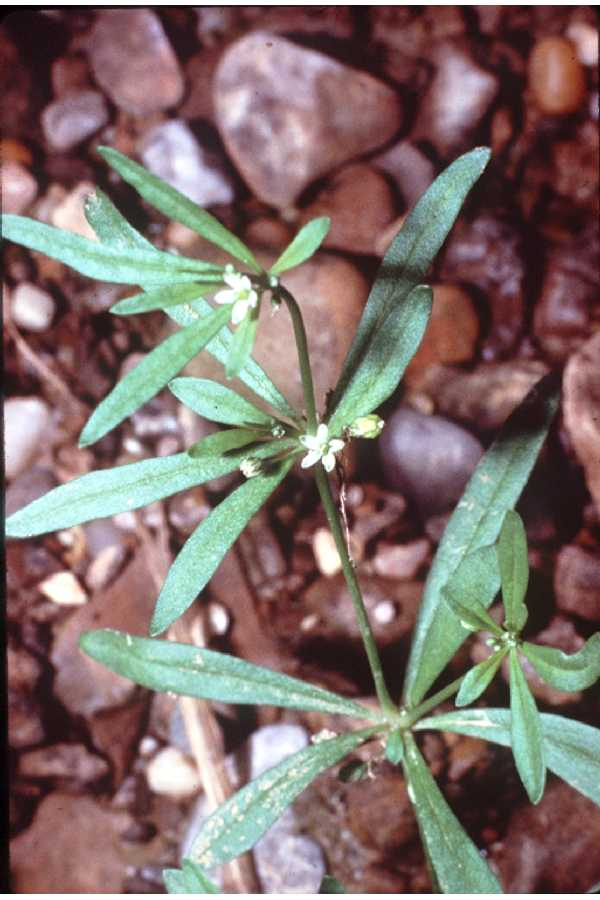
- from Thomé (1885)

Scientific classification
- Kingdom: Plantae
- Clade: Tracheophytes
- Clade: Angiosperms
- Clade: Eudicots
- Order: Caryophyllales
- Family: Molluginaceae; Bartl.

Genera
- See text

= Molluginaceae =

Family of flowering plants

The Molluginaceae are a family of flowering plants recognized by several taxonomists. It was previously included in the larger family Aizoaceae. The APG III system of 2009 made no change in the status of the family as compared to the APG II system of 2003 and the APG system of 1998, apart from a reassignment of several genera, such as the placement of Corrigiola and Telephium into Caryophyllaceae, Corbichonia in Lophiocarpaceae, Microtea into Microteaceae and Limeum in Limeaceae, because the family was found to be widely polyphyletic in Caryophyllales. In addition Macarthuria was found not to be related to Limeum as previously thought and thus it was placed in Macarthuriaceae, and similarly species formerly placed in Hypertelis, apart from type species Hypertelis spergulacea, a true Molluginaceae, were found to belong elsewhere and were described as Kewa in the family Kewaceae, named for the Royal Botanic Gardens Kew. Molluginaceae is still assigned to the order Caryophyllales in the clade core eudicots, although the generic circumscription is difficult because Mollugo is not monophyletic.

== Genera ==
Molluginaceae in its current circumscription includes ca 9 genera and ca 80 known species

- Adenogramma Rchb.
- Coelanthum E.Mey. ex Fenzl
- Glinus L.
- Glischrothamnus Pilg.
- Hypertelis E.Mey. ex Fenzl
- Mollugo L.
- Pharnaceum L.
- Polpoda C.Presl
- Psammotropha Eckl. & Zeyh.
- Suessenguthiella Friedrich

=== Excluded genera ===
- Corbichonia Scop. (now correctly placed in Lophiocarpaceae)
- Corrigiola L. (now correctly placed in Caryophyllaceae)
- Kewa Christenh. (correctly placed in Kewaceae)
- Limeum L. (now correctly placed in Limeaceae)
- Macarthuria Hugel ex Endl. (now correctly placed in Macarthuriaceae)
- Orygia Forssk. = Corbichonia Scop. (Lophiocarpaceae)
- Semonvillea J.Gay = Limeum L. (Limeaceae)
- Telephium L. (now correctly placed in Caryophyllaceae)

=== Genera listed in Tropicos ===
Tropicos currently includes 12 genera.

Genus	Author	Reference	Date
Adenogramma	Rchb.	Icon. Bot. Exot. 2: 3	1828
Coelanthum	E. Mey. ex Fenzl	Ann. Wiener Mus. Naturgesch. 1: 353	1836
Glinus	L.	Sp. Pl. 1: 463	1753
Glischrothamnus	Pilg.	Bot. Jahrb. Syst. 40: 396	1908
Hypertelis	E. Mey. ex Fenzl	Ann. Wiener Mus. Naturgesch. 1: 352	1836
Mollugo	L.	Sp. Pl. 1: 89	1753
Orygia (Note: Orygia may be synonomus with Corbichonia in the family Lophiocarpaceae)	Forssk.	Fl. Aegypt.-Arab. 103	1775
Paramollugo	Thulin	Taxon 65(4): 784	2016
Pharnaceum	L.	Sp. Pl. 1: 272	1753
Polpoda	C. Presl	Polpoda [Nov. Pl. Gen.]	1829
Psammotropha	Eckl. & Zeyh.	Enum. Pl. Afr. Austral. 286	1836
Suessenguthiella	Friedrich	Mitt. Bot. Staatssamml. München 2(12): 60–62, f. A	1955
