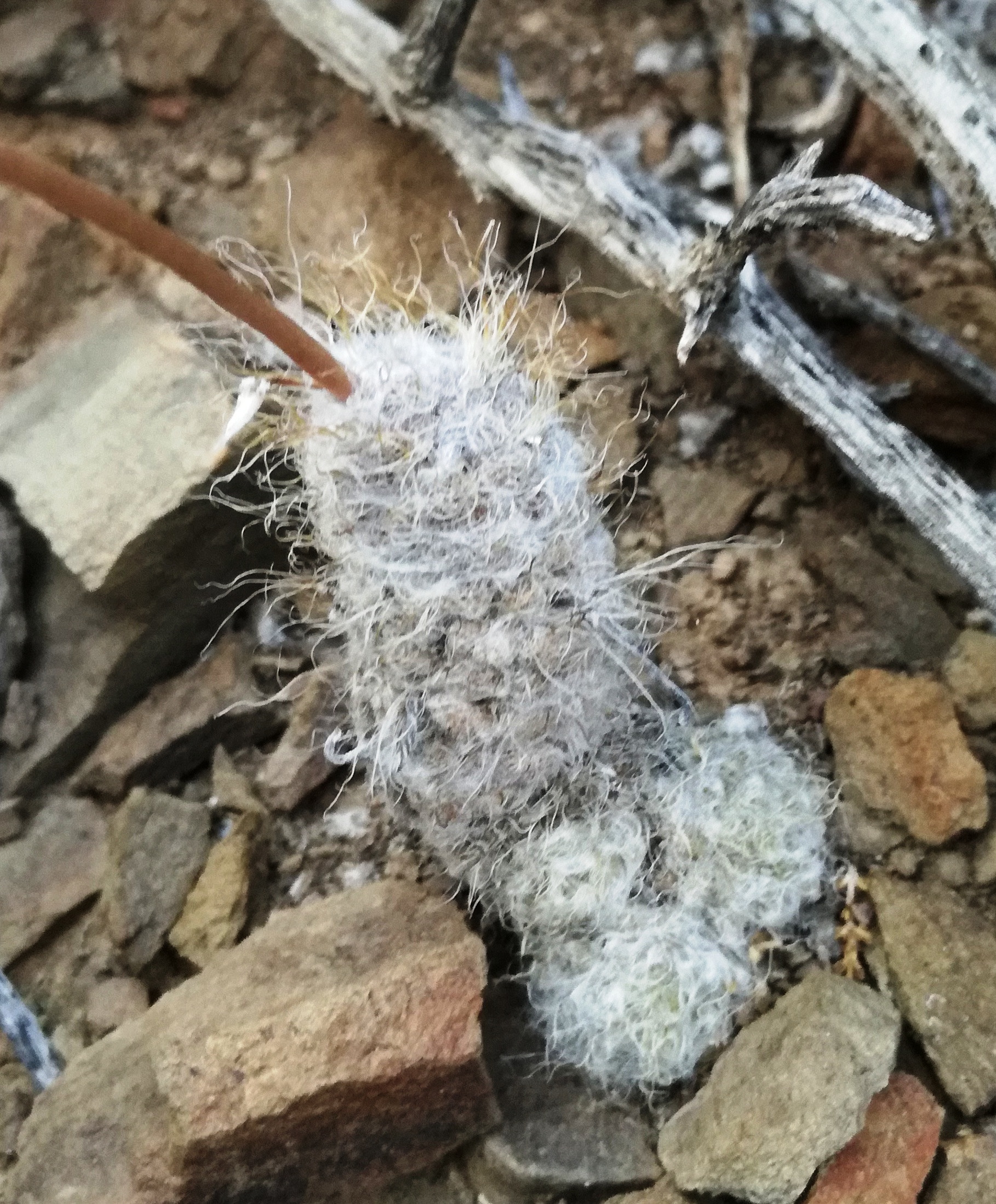

Scientific classification
- Kingdom: Plantae
- Clade: Tracheophytes
- Clade: Angiosperms
- Clade: Eudicots
- Order: Caryophyllales
- Family: Anacampserotaceae
- Genus: Anacampseros
- Species: A. albidiflora

Binomial name
- Anacampseros albidiflora Poelln.

= Anacampseros albidiflora =

Species of plant

Anacampseros albidiflora is a species of succulent plant native to the Great Karoo and Little Karoo regions of South Africa. It is within the Anacampserotaceae family.

== Description ==
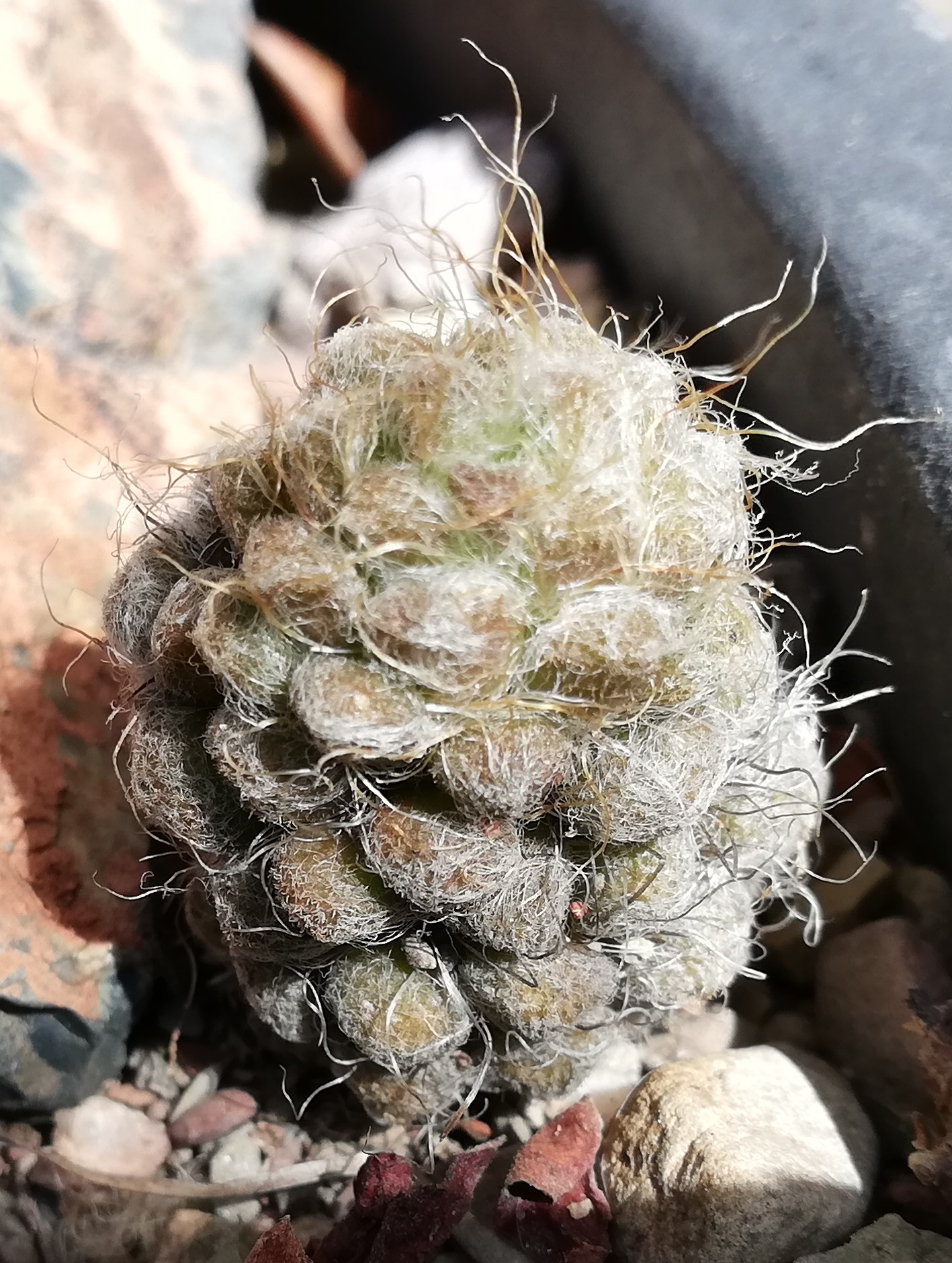
Stem detail

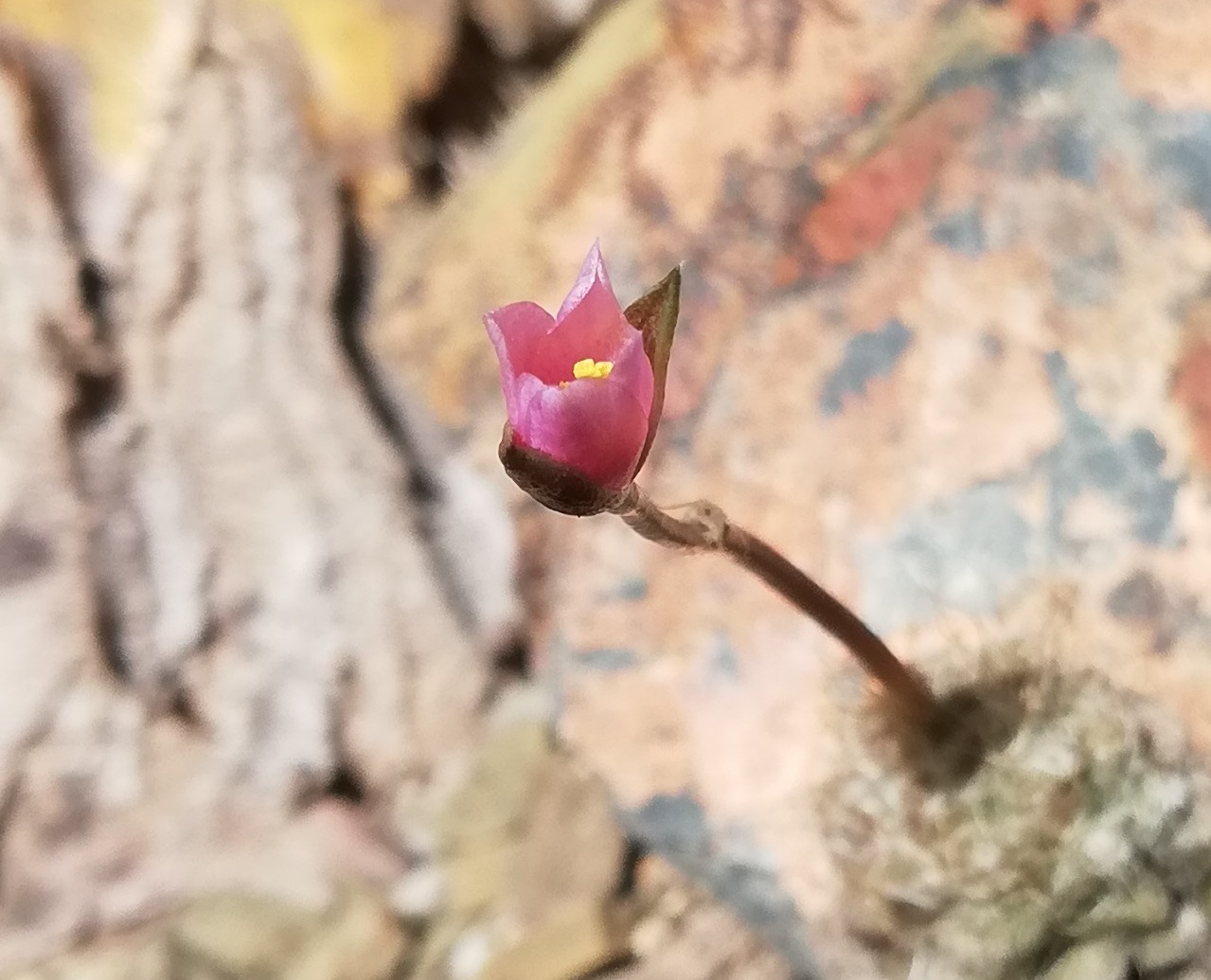
Flower detail (pink-flowered form)

The small (4 cm high), erect column-stems of this species are extremely hairy.

The tiny rounded leaves have slight downcurved tips. The long (up to 2 cm), white, curling hairs extend further out than its small (7x5mm), red-green, rounded (obovoid), densely packed leaves, and cover them. (Unlike Anacampseros subnuda, its older leaves do not become bald.)

An. albidiflora has pale pink to white-ish flowers, each with roughly 25 stamens.

=== Similar related species ===
It is often confused with the related species, Anacampseros arachnoides - another hairy Anacampseros with a similar distribution (though favouring slightly moister habitats). However the leaves of An. arachnoides are ovoid, with tiny acuminate points, and are arranged in a 2/5 spiral.

The leaves of An. albidiflora are obovoid-rounded to truncate, and are arranged in a 3/8 spiral (similar to those of Anacampseros subnuda or Anacampseros filamentosa).

== Distribution ==
An. albidiflora occurs in the Little Karoo and Great Karoo regions of the Western Cape and Eastern Cape provinces of South Africa.

Of the region's other Anacampseros species, with which it co-occurs, An. albidiflora tends to favour the most arid habitats. In habitats which are more arid still, a member of a closely related genus, Avonia papyracea, becomes dominant; In slightly less arid habitats, Anacampseros arachnoides takes over.
