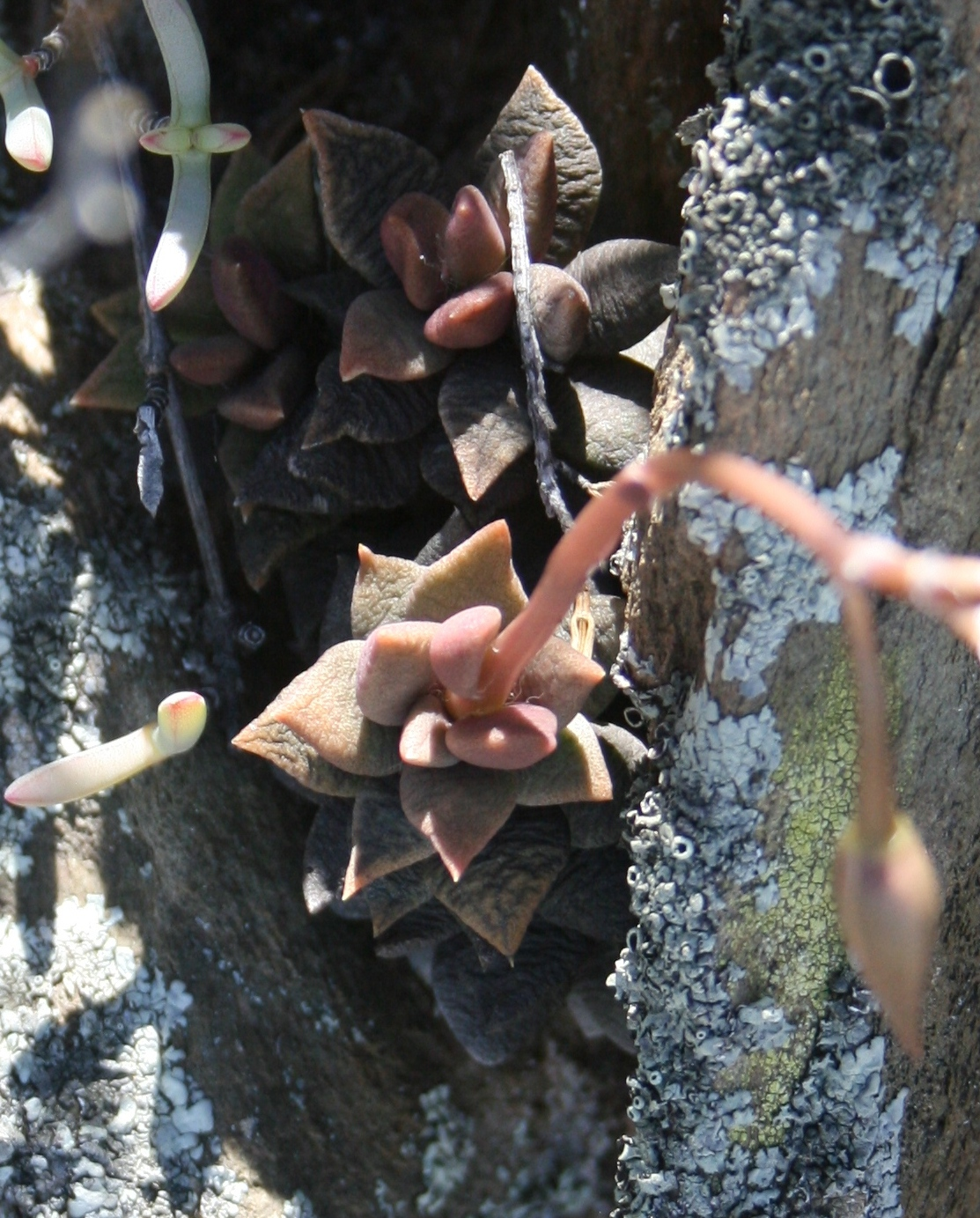
- The thick, soft, pointed, brown-green leaves of Anacampseros telephiastrum

Scientific classification
- Kingdom: Plantae
- Clade: Tracheophytes
- Clade: Angiosperms
- Clade: Eudicots
- Order: Caryophyllales
- Family: Anacampserotaceae
- Genus: Anacampseros
- Species: A. telephiastrum

Binomial name
- Anacampseros telephiastrum DC.

= Anacampseros telephiastrum =

Species of plant

Anacampseros telephiastrum is a species of succulent plant native to the southern Karoo region of the Western Cape and Eastern Cape Provinces of South Africa, from Robertson in the west, to Somerset East in the east.

== Description ==
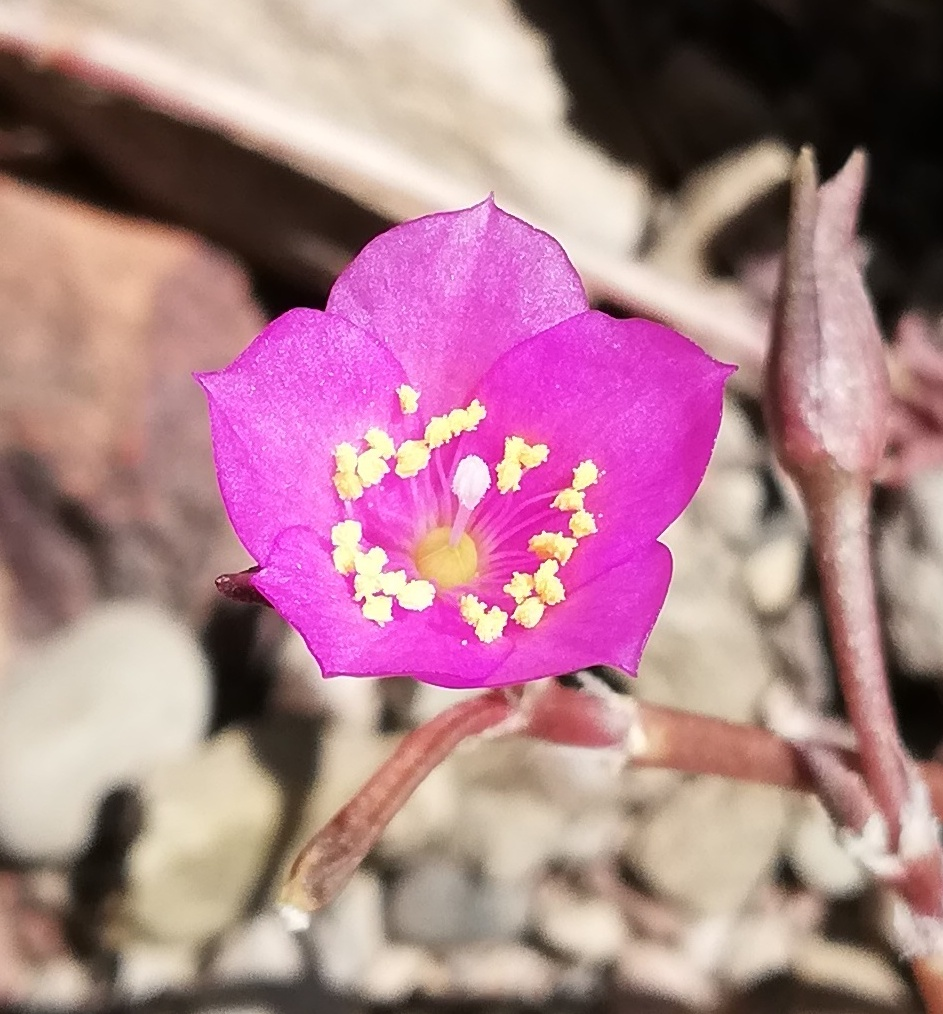
The broadly ovate, pink or white petals of an Anacampseros telephiastrum flower

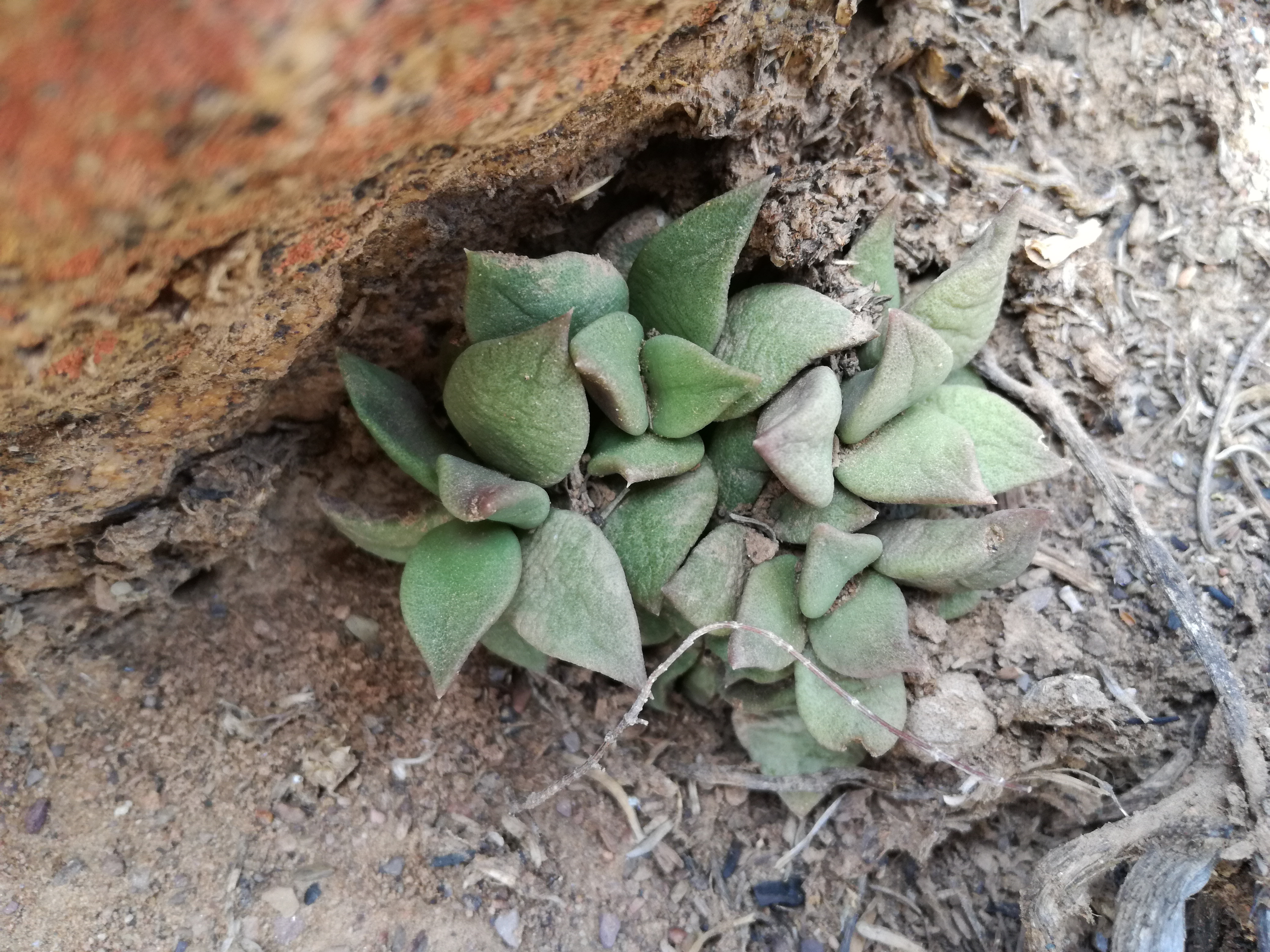
The loosely-arranged, brown-green, papillate leaves of An. telephiastrum

A small branching species with loosely-held 18mm long leaves. The leaves are brown-green with papillae and tiny points (mucros) at their tips. (Unlike its relative Anacampseros rufescens, its leaves are not reddish below.)

An. telephiastrum has relatively few axillary hairs, and its hairs or bristles are shorter than its leaves or sometimes even barely visible.

The pink flowers have 30-45 stamens and appear on a bracteose inflorescence.

== Habitat ==
It co-occurs with several related species of Anacampseros, but favours specific conditions. It inhabits spots that are slightly more arid than those in which Anacampseros retusa grows. However, in spots that are more arid still, it tends to be replaced by the related Anacampseros arachnoides.
