= Grahamia australiana =

Scientific classification
- Kingdom: Plantae
- Clade: Embryophytes
- Clade: Tracheophytes
- Clade: Spermatophytes
- Clade: Angiosperms
- Clade: Eudicots
- Order: Caryophyllales
- Family: Anacampserotaceae
- Genus: Grahamia
- Species: G. australiana

Binomial name
- Grahamia australiana J.M. Black G.D.Rowley

Synonyms
- Anacampseros australiana J.M.Black

Species of flowering plant

Grahamia australiana is a species of plant from the family Anacampserotaceae which is endemic to Australia, it is often better known as Anacampseros australiana but the genus Anacampseros is now thought to be restricted to Africa.

== Description ==
Grahamia australiana is a perennial succulent herb with weak, fleshy branches which have succulent, sessile leaves arranged alternately around their tips and which has tuberous roots and ascending flowering stems up to 20 cm in length which are leafy towards their base. The leaves are oblanceolate to obovate in shape, and are infrequently elliptic, measuring 1–2.5 cm in length and 5–12 mm across with a sharp point at the tip and covered in hairs. The inflorescences consist of few-flowered cymes The sepals enclose the 5 white to pinkish petals which are each 5–15 mm long and there are 8-10 stamens. The superior ovary is round and contains numerous ovules. It has a 3-valved fruit 5–12 mm long which sheds its epicarp early, the endocarp is a membrane which persists, the endocarp valves are surrounded by and are alternate with bristly, white and hardened remains of mesocarp and contains numerous pyramidal seeds.

== Distribution and habitat ==
Grahamia australiana is endemic to Australia where it is found in New South Wales, Queensland, Northern Territory and South Australia. This plant can be found on rocky ranges, hills or rises composed of neutral or acidic rocks, and is often recorded as growing from rock crevices and between boulders. It has been recorded as flowering throughout the year and the fruits usually appear about a month after flowering.
