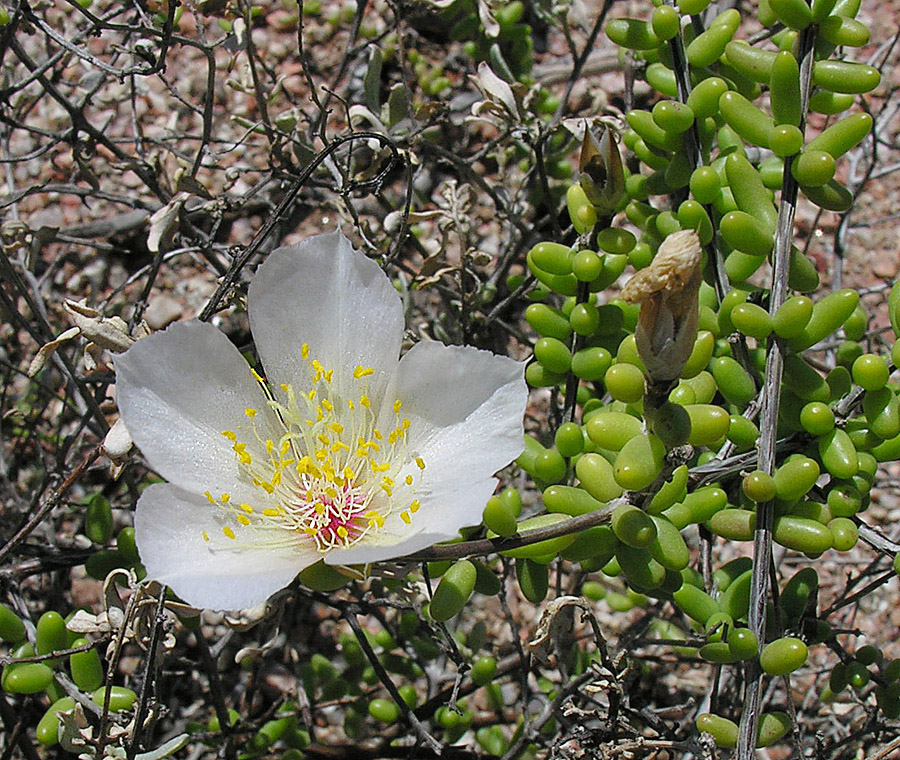
- Grahamia bracteata

Scientific classification
- Kingdom: Plantae
- Clade: Tracheophytes
- Clade: Angiosperms
- Clade: Eudicots
- Order: Caryophyllales
- Family: Anacampserotaceae
- Genus: Grahamia; Gillies, 1833 ex Hook. & Arn.

Species
- Grahamia australiana (J.M.Black) G.D.Rowley; Grahamia bracteata Gillies ex Hook. & Arn.; Grahamia coahuilensis (S.Watson) G.D.Rowley; Grahamia frutescens (A.Gray) G.D.Rowley → Talinopsis frutescens A.Gray; Grahamia kurtzii (Bacigalupo) G.D.Rowley; Grahamia vulcanensis (Añon) G.D.Rowley

Synonyms
- Talinopsis A. Gray, 1852; Talinaria Brandegee, 1906; Xenia Gerbaulet, 1992

= Grahamia (plant) =

Genus of plants

Grahamia is a genus of succulent plants in the family Anacampserotaceae which contains six species which show a disjunct distribution, three species being found in northern Argentina, two in Mexico and one in Australia.

== Distribution and taxonomy ==
Three species Grahamia bracteata, Grahamia kurtzii and Grahamia vulcanensis are found in northern Argentina, while Grahamia coahuilensis occurs in central Mexico and Grahamia frutescens is found in northern Mexico. Grahamia australiana is endemic to Australia. The genus Grahamia is divided into two subgenera, subgenus Grahamia contains G. bracteata and G, fructesecens which are low, scrambling small shrubs with stiff branches and cylindrical, rather smooth leaves; while Grahamia subgenus Talinaria are succulent, long-lived herbs with distinct succulent leaves on weak fleshy branches with the leaves aggregated near the branch tips. G. australiana was previously considered to be a member of the genus Anacampseros and the remaining species were placed in four monotypic genera, except for G. vulcanensis which was not considered. It is now thought that all six species are best considered in a single genus as proposed by G. D. Rowley. Other authorities, however, placed G. vulcanensis in Anacampseros.

== Brief description ==
The species of Grahamia vary from partially deciduous small shrubs with succulent leaves to perennial succulent herbs, but they all have a single tuberous tap root. The leaves are glabrous, except for the axils, and may be flat or cylindrical in shape. The inflorescences are grouped in 3-6 scapes or in loose terminal cymes.

== Naming ==
The genus was described by John Miers and later by John Gillies after their excursions to mountains of San Luis and Mendoza in western Argentina. The generic name Grahamia probably honours the Chile-based Scottish traveler and plant collector Maria Graham; some sources assign it to Scottish botanist Robert Graham (1786–1845), who was Maria's brother-in-law and associate.
