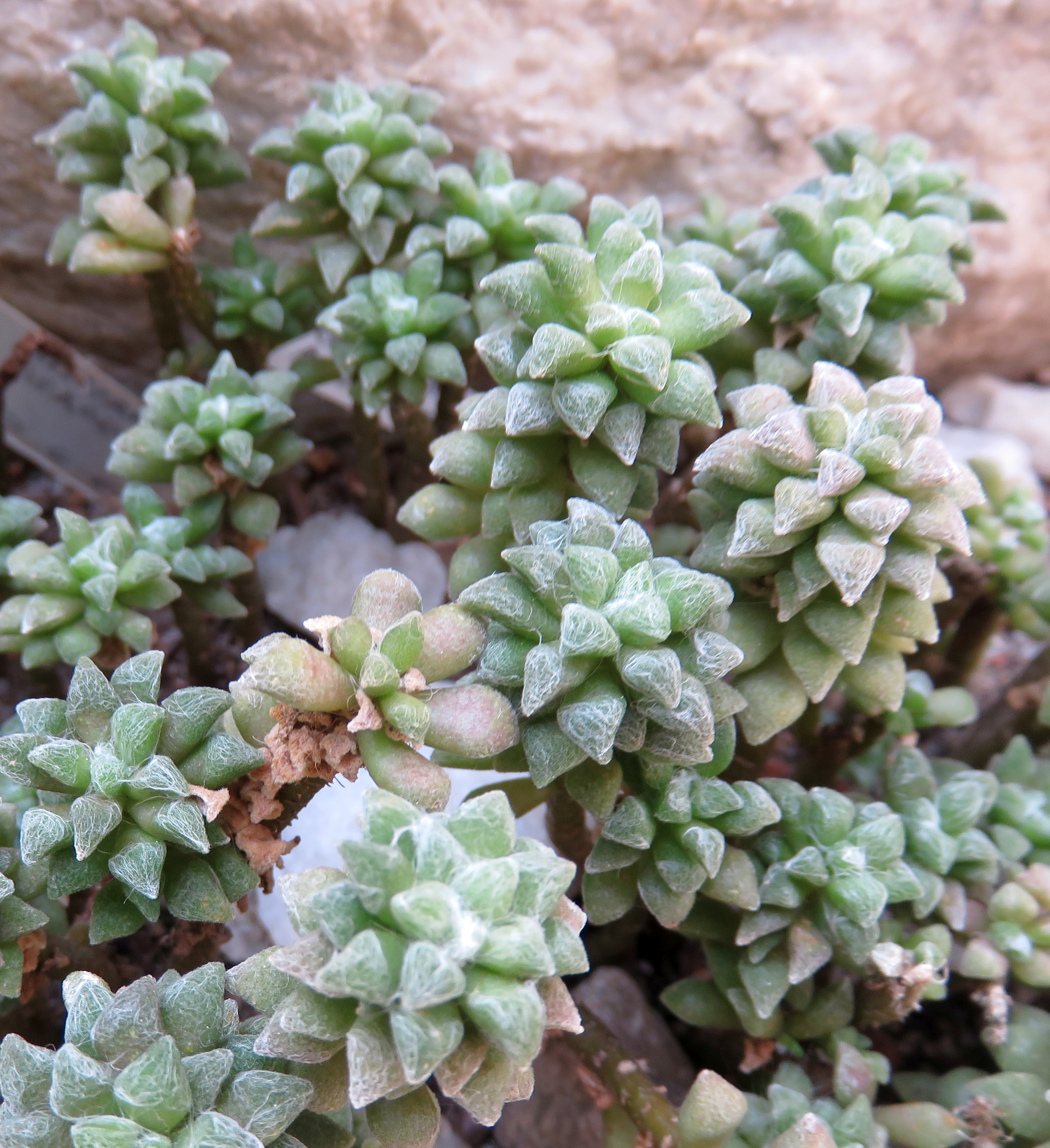

Scientific classification
- Kingdom: Plantae
- Clade: Tracheophytes
- Clade: Angiosperms
- Clade: Eudicots
- Order: Caryophyllales
- Family: Anacampserotaceae
- Genus: Anacampseros
- Species: A. arachnoides

Binomial name
- Anacampseros arachnoides (Haw.) Sims

= Anacampseros arachnoides =

Species of plant

Anacampseros arachnoides is a species of succulent plant native to the Little Karoo region of South Africa.

== Description ==
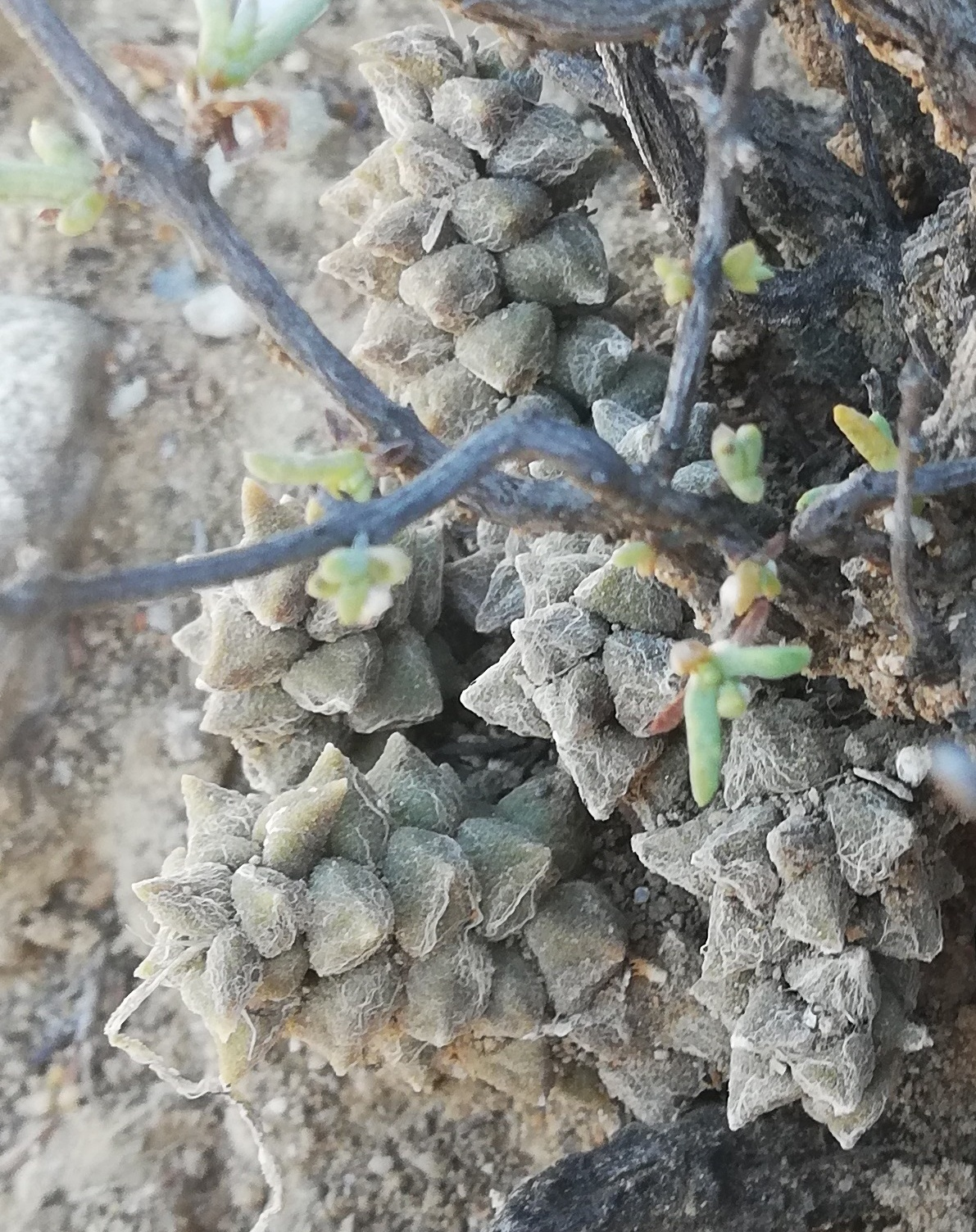
Anacampseros arachnoides, growing near Montagu, South Africa

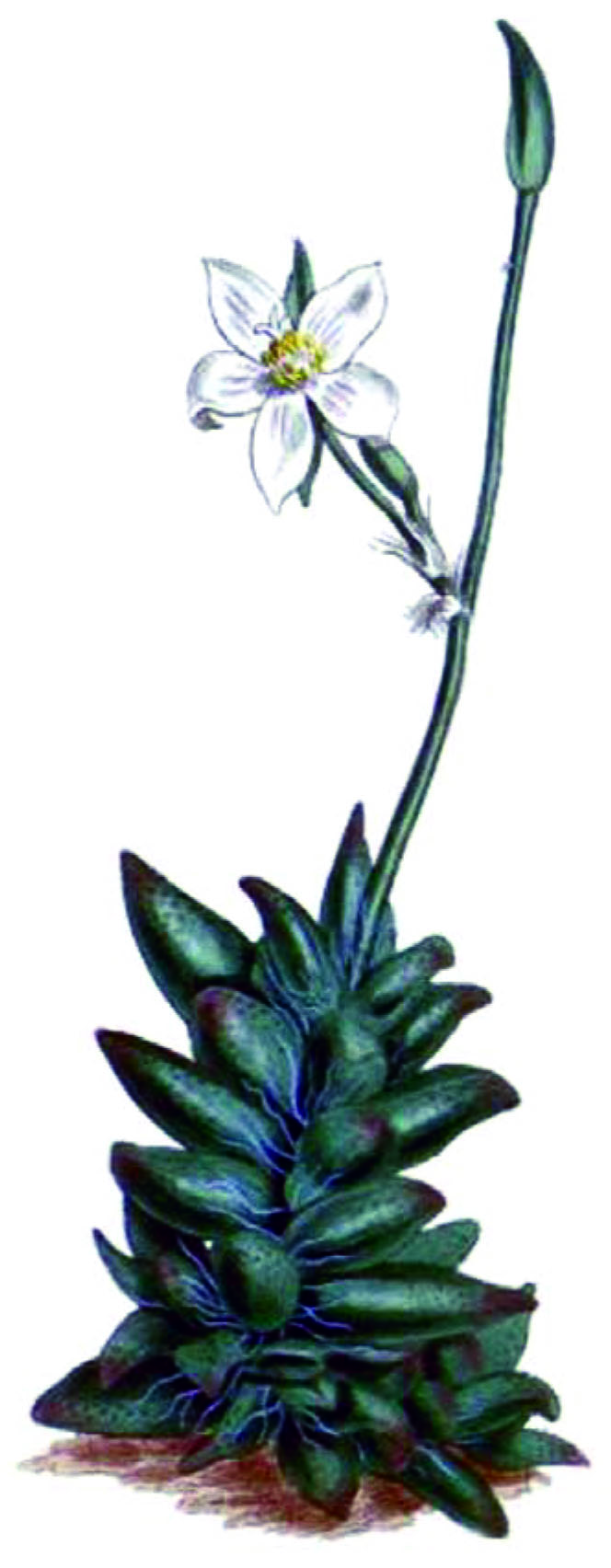
Anacampseros arachnoides illustration from Curtis's Botanical Magazine

This species grows slender erect stems (5 cm (2.0 in) tall).

The leaves are hairy, compact, and densely arranged in a 2/5 spiral (In contrast, those of An.albidiflora and An.filamentosa are generally in a 3/8 spiral).

Each leaf is ovoid in shape, about as thick as it is wide (20 mm (0.79 in) in length x 15 mm (0.59 in) wide), and has a tiny acute point.

The flowers are pink-to-white.

== Distribution ==
An. arachnoides occurs in the Little Karoo region of the Western Cape and Eastern Cape provinces of South Africa. It can also be found just to the north, in the southern edge of the Great Karoo.
