= Anacampseros albissima =

Scientific classification
- Kingdom: Plantae
- Clade: Tracheophytes
- Clade: Angiosperms
- Clade: Eudicots
- Order: Caryophyllales
- Family: Anacampserotaceae
- Genus: Anacampseros
- Species: A. albissima

Binomial name
- Anacampseros albissima Marloth

Synonyms
- Homotypic Synonyms: Avonia albissima (Marloth) G.D.Rowley; Heterotypic Synonyms: Anacampseros avasmontana Dinter ex Poelln.

Species of plant

Anacampseros albissima is a species of succulent plant in the family Anacampserotaceae. It is native to the Karoo desert of South Africa. Its common name in Afrikaans, skilpadkos, means 'tortoise food'.
