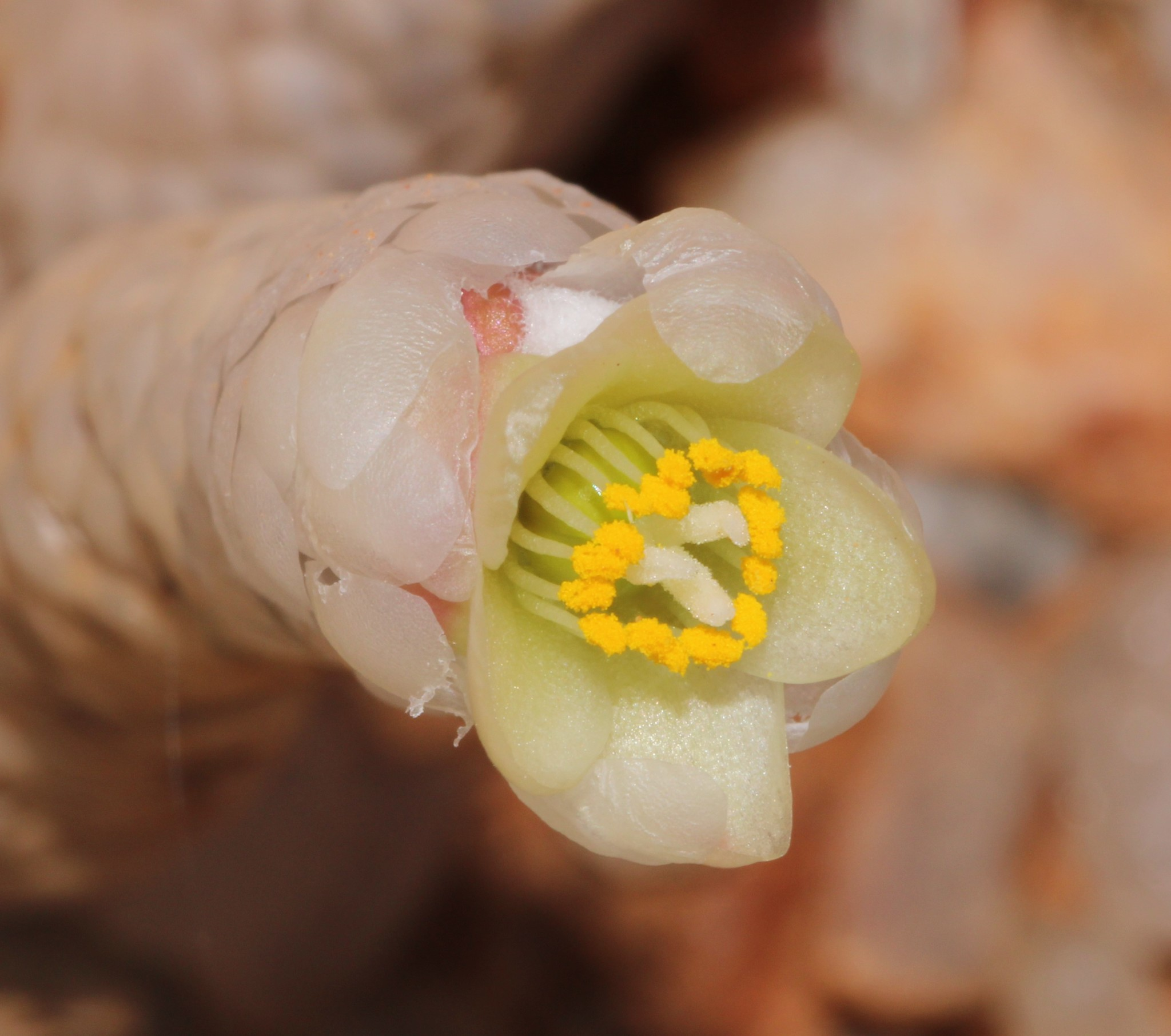

Conservation status
- Least Concern (SANBI Red List)

Scientific classification
- Kingdom: Plantae
- Clade: Tracheophytes
- Clade: Angiosperms
- Clade: Eudicots
- Order: Caryophyllales
- Family: Anacampserotaceae
- Genus: Anacampseros
- Species: A. papyracea

Binomial name
- Anacampseros papyracea E.Mey. ex Fenzl, 1840

Synonyms
- Avonia papyracea (E.Mey. ex Fenzl) G.D.Rowley

= Anacampseros papyracea =

Species of succulent endemic to Southern Africa

Anacampseros papyracea is a species of succulent plant in the family Anacampserotaceae. It is endemic to Southern Africa.

== Taxonomy ==
Anacampseros papyracea contains the following subspecies:

- Anacampseros papyracea subsp. papyracea
- Anacampseros papyracea subsp. namaensis Gerbaulet
- Anacampseros papyracea subsp. perplexa (G.Will.) Dreher

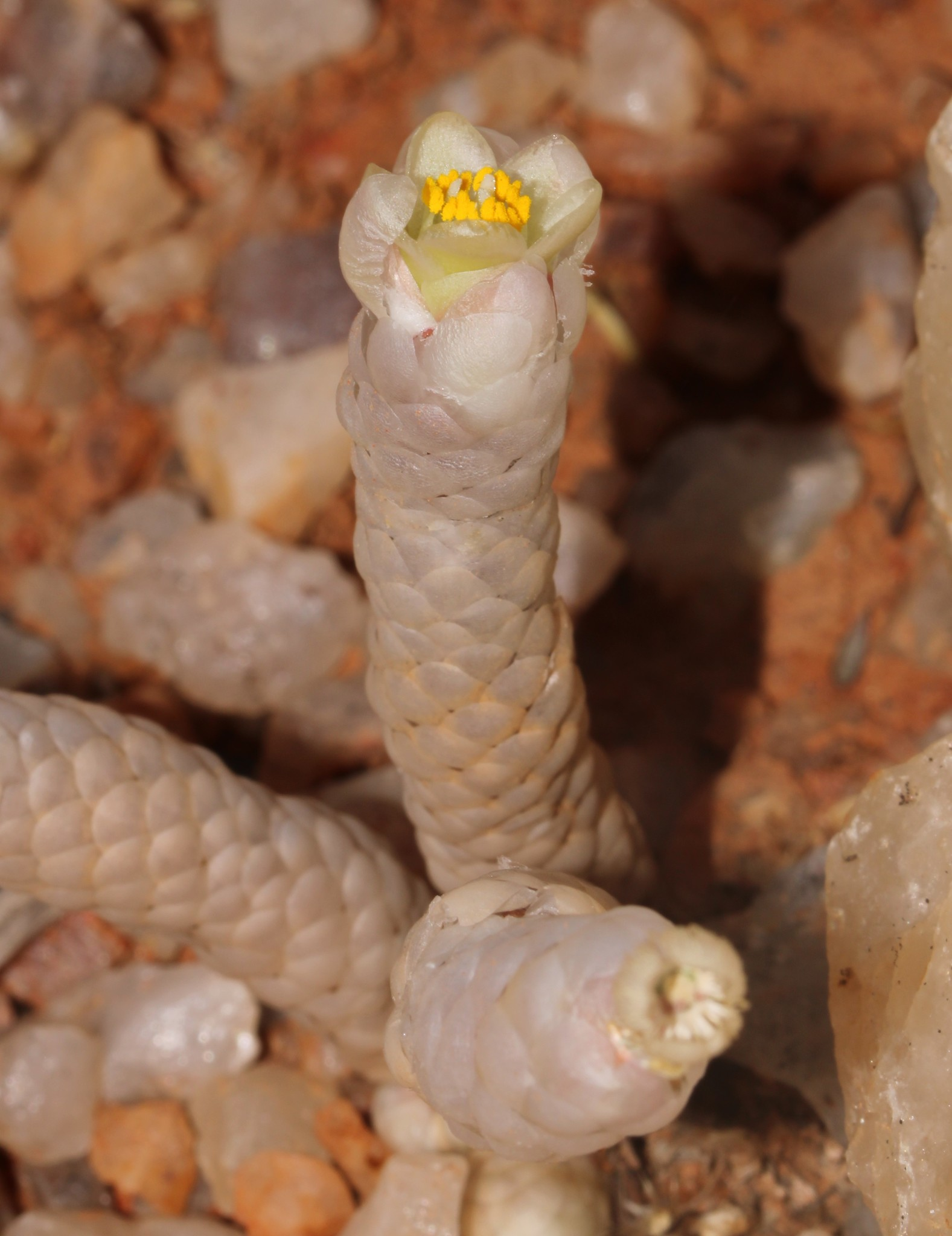
Anacampseros papyracea subsp. namaensis

== Distribution ==
- Anacampseros papyracea subsp. papyracea is endemic to the Eastern Cape.
- Anacampseros papyracea subsp. namaensis is endemic to Namibia, and also found in the Northern Cape.
- Anacampseros papyracea subsp. perplexa is found in the Western Cape

== Conservation status ==
Both Anacampseros papyracea subsp. papyracea and Anacampseros papyracea subsp. namaensis are classified as Least Concern according to SANBI.
