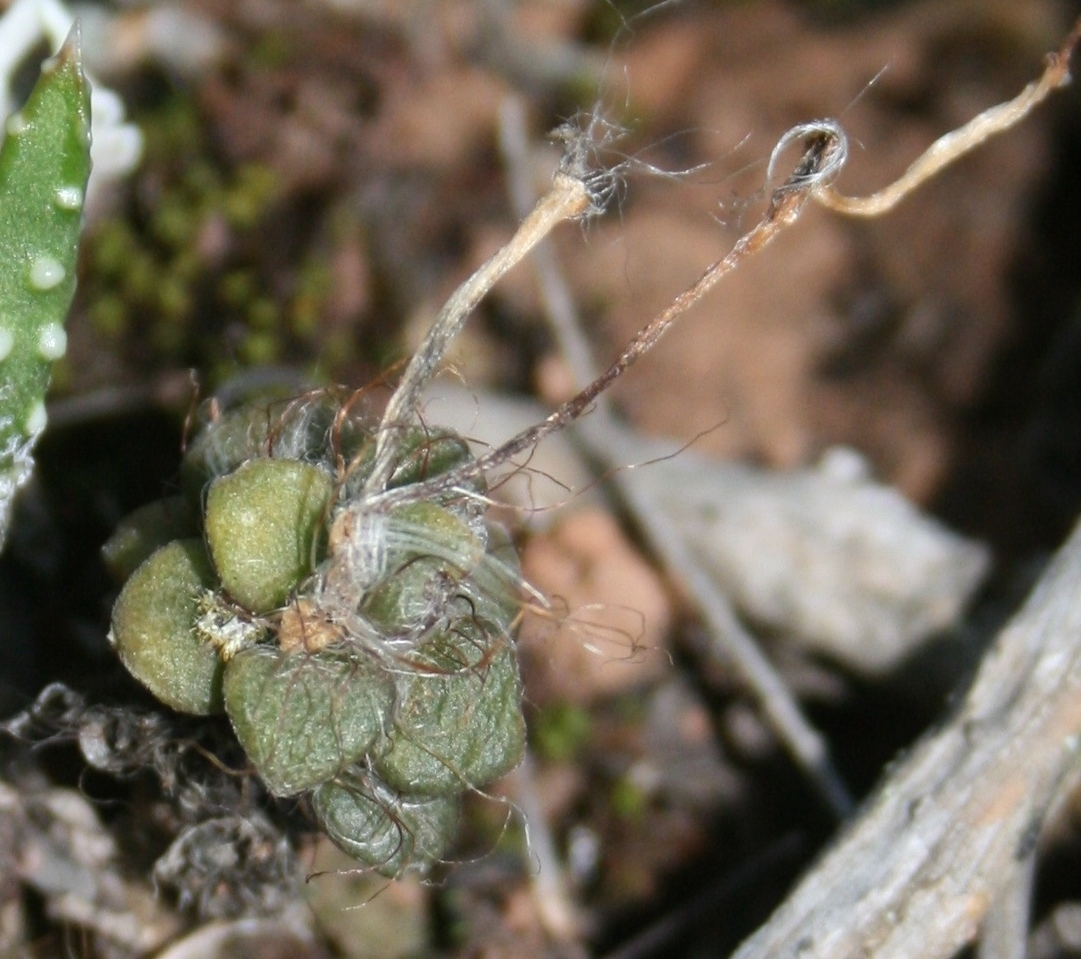

Scientific classification
- Kingdom: Plantae
- Clade: Tracheophytes
- Clade: Angiosperms
- Clade: Eudicots
- Order: Caryophyllales
- Family: Anacampserotaceae
- Genus: Anacampseros
- Species: A. retusa

Binomial name
- Anacampseros retusa Poelln.

= Anacampseros retusa =

Species of plant

Anacampseros retusa is a species of succulent plant native to the Northern Cape and Western Cape Provinces of South Africa, as well as to Namibia.

== Description ==
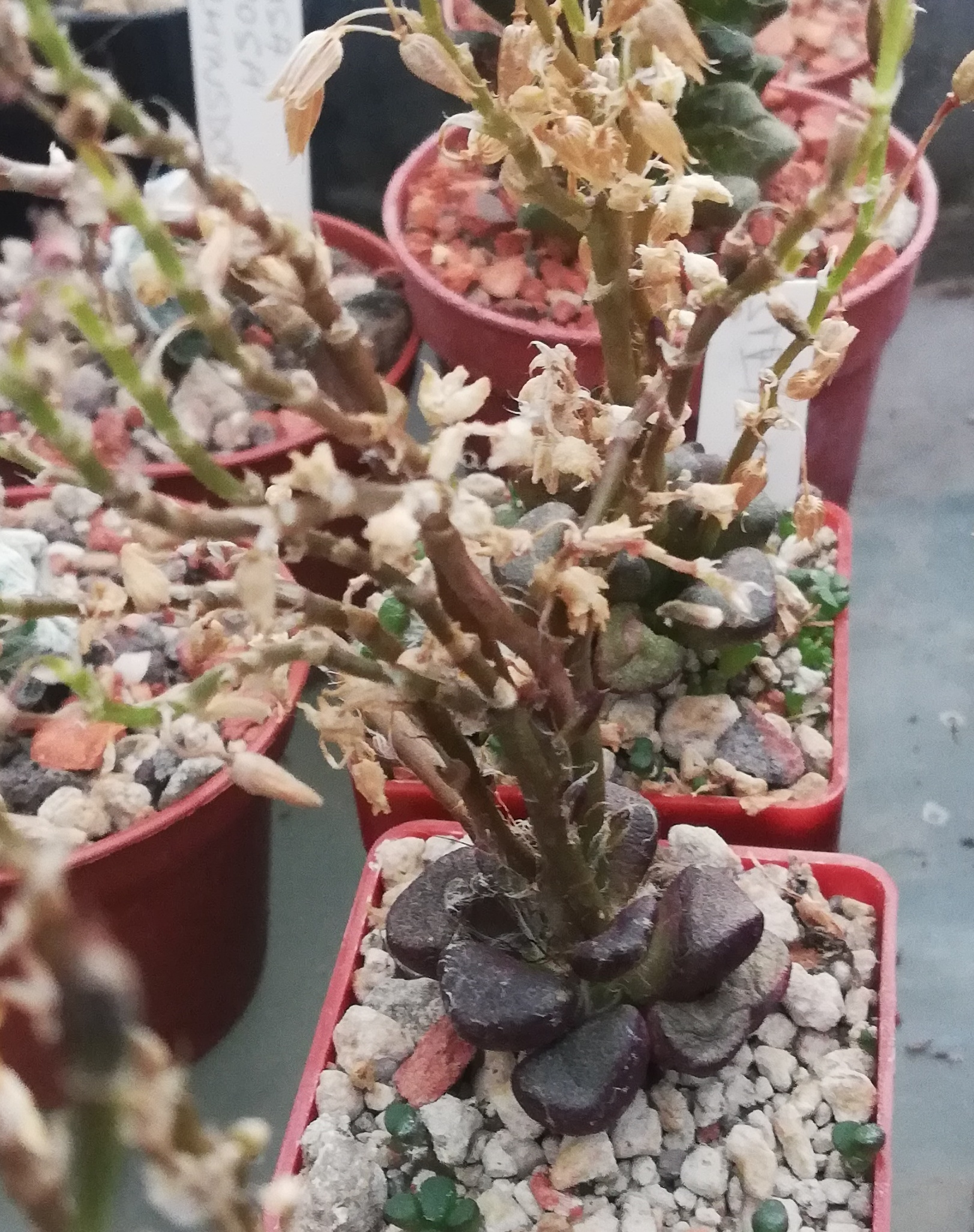
Anacampseros retusa in cultivation

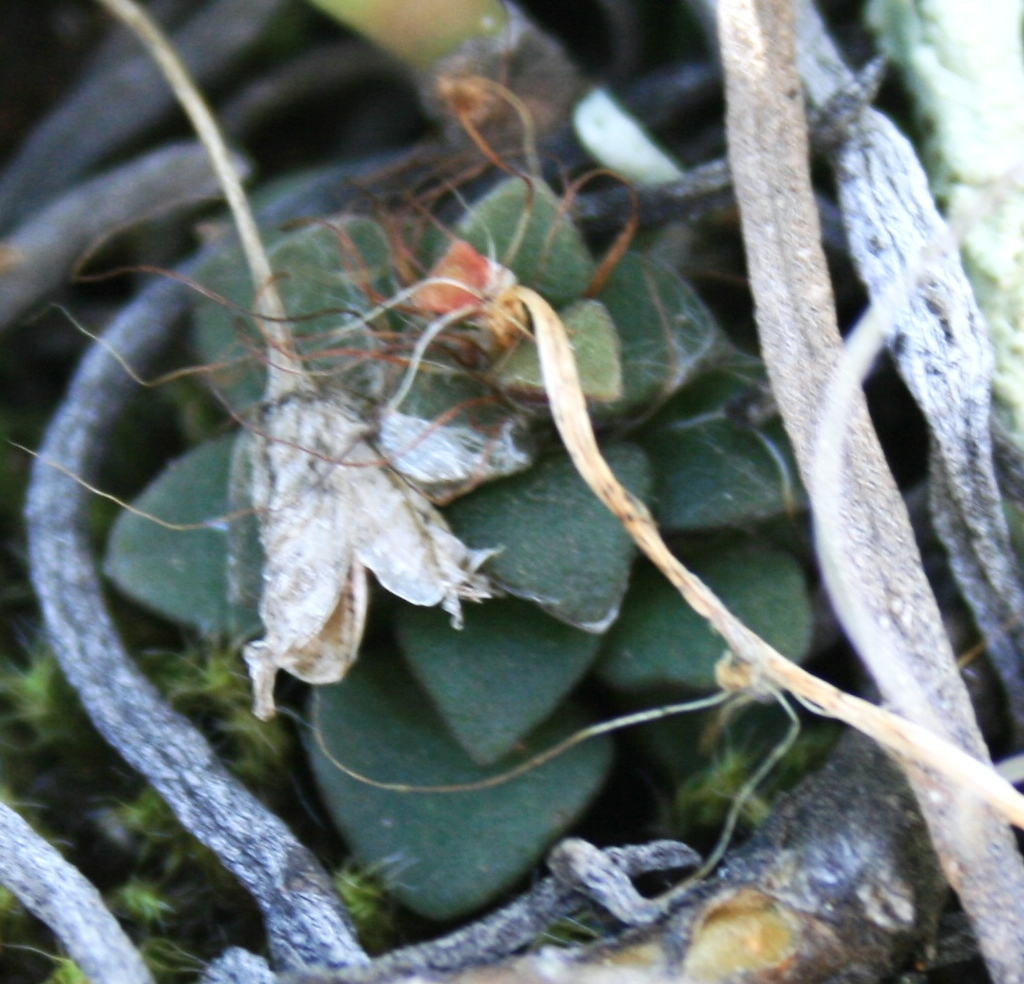
The dark, dense, compact leaves of Anacampseros retusa.

An. retusa has a short, thick caudex. Branching stems are about 4 cm long. They are low or level with the ground.

The leaves of this species are not hairy or felted, though they can sometimes have an indistinct tomentum over them. The leaves are dark green, densely-packed, obovate, compact ("retuse") - over one and a half times wider than they are thick, and up to 17 mm long.

Its flowers have pink, thinly-ovate petals and 20-25 stamens, and are born on a short inflorescence.

In contrast, similar smooth-leaved species, such as Anacampseros lanceolata or Anacampseros telephiastrum, have leaves over 18 mm long. Their flowers have broadly-ovate petals and 30-45 stamens.

== Distribution ==
An. retusa has a long, but narrow, distribution range. It occurs in southern Namibia and the western Namaqualand region of South Africa, as far south as the Ceres Karoo, and Worcester in the Robertson Karoo. It also extends slightly into the northern Overberg region.

It co-occurs with several related species of Anacampseros, but favours specific conditions. It inhabits spots that are slightly more arid than those in which Anacampseros lanceolata grows. However, in spots that are more arid still, it tends to be replaced by the related Anacampseros telephiastrum.
