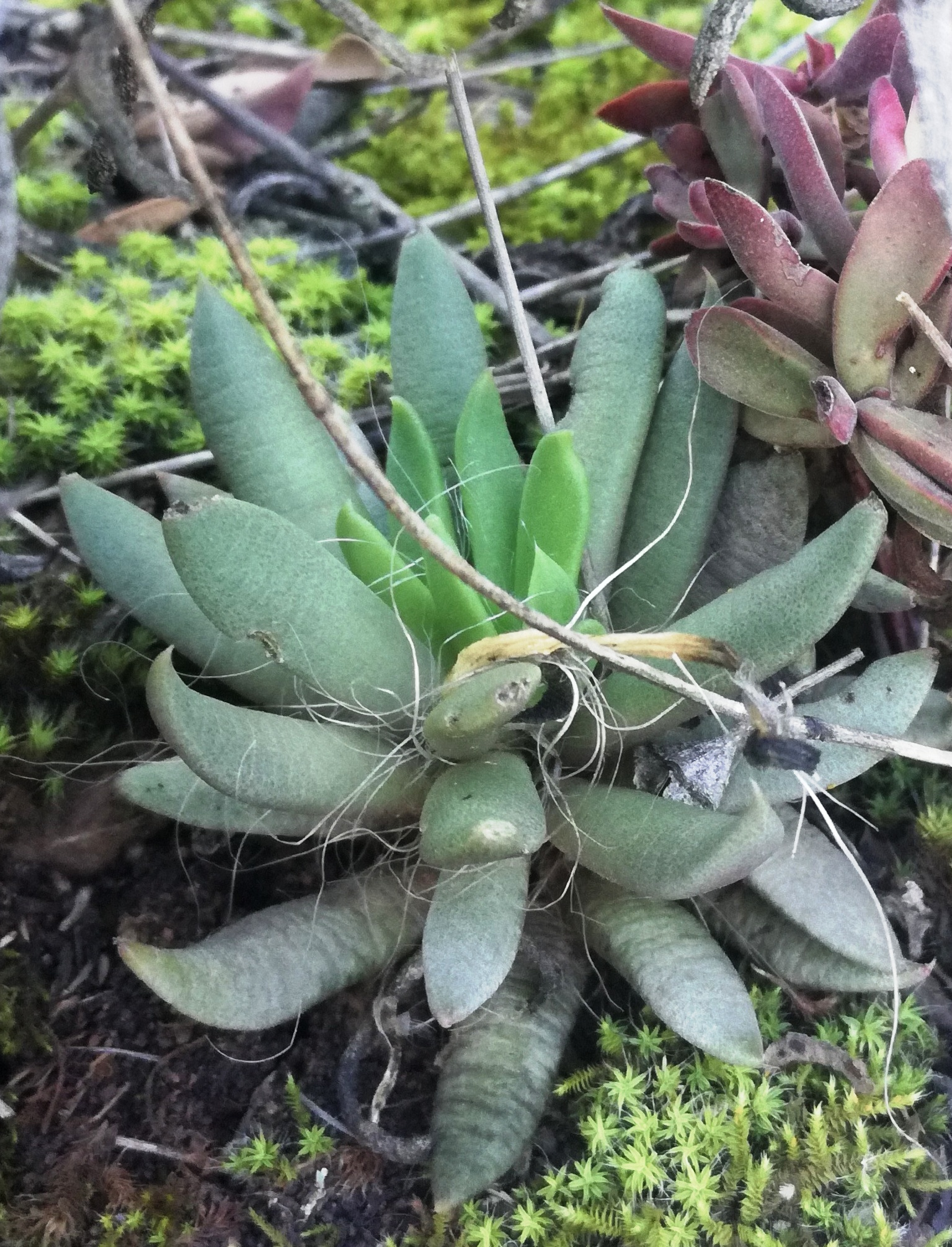

Scientific classification
- Kingdom: Plantae
- Clade: Tracheophytes
- Clade: Angiosperms
- Clade: Eudicots
- Order: Caryophyllales
- Family: Anacampserotaceae
- Genus: Anacampseros
- Species: A. lanceolata

Binomial name
- Anacampseros lanceolata (Haw.) Sweet

= Anacampseros lanceolata =

Species of plant

Anacampseros lanceolata is a species of succulent plant native to the western Karoo and Overberg regions of South Africa.

== Description ==
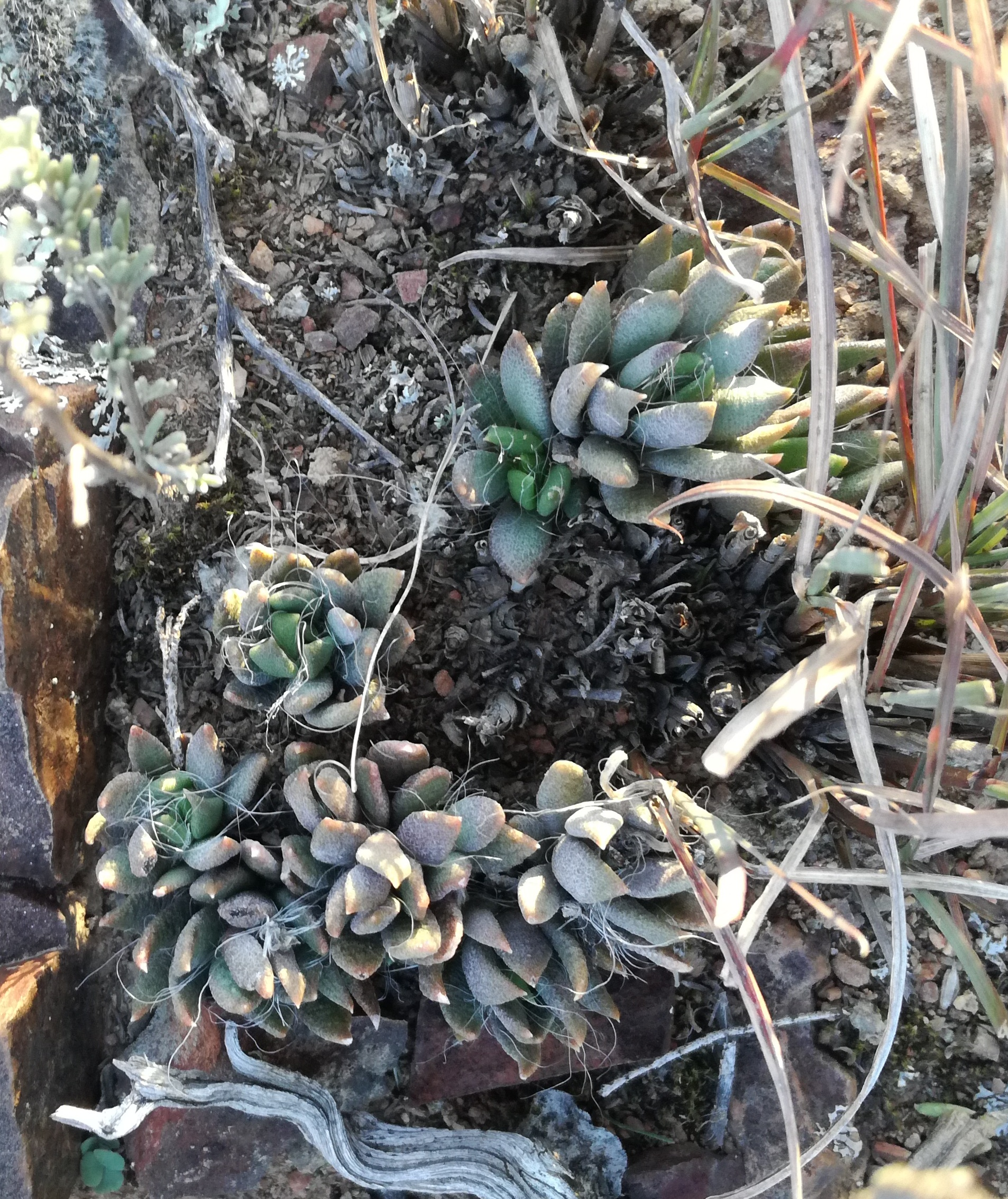
Detail of the acute, lanceolate leaf-points of An.lanceolata.

An. lanceolata has branching stems, reaching around 8 cm in height. It has smooth, hairless, tapering leaves (2–3 cm long) with flat upper surfaces and acute-lanceolate tips. It grows relatively few, long bristly hairs between its leaves (axillary hairs). In subspecies lanceolata, these bristles are shorter than the leaves, while in the subspecies nebrownii they are longer.

It has a branched inflorescence with broadly ovate petals, 30-45 stamens per flower and angular seeds. The flowers are pink or white.

== Distribution ==
This species has an extensive (but narrow) distribution along the western part of South Africa, from the border with Namibia, through the Namaqualand and western Great Karoo, down to the Worcester area in the Robertson Karoo.

The subspecies nebrownii occurs in the Overberg region to the south, from Bredasdorp in the west, to Uniondale in the east.

This species, of the region's Anacampseros species, tends to favour relatively less arid areas, and is often found in Fynbos or Renosterveld vegetation. In slightly more arid habitats, it tends to be replaced by its close relative Anacampseros retusa.
