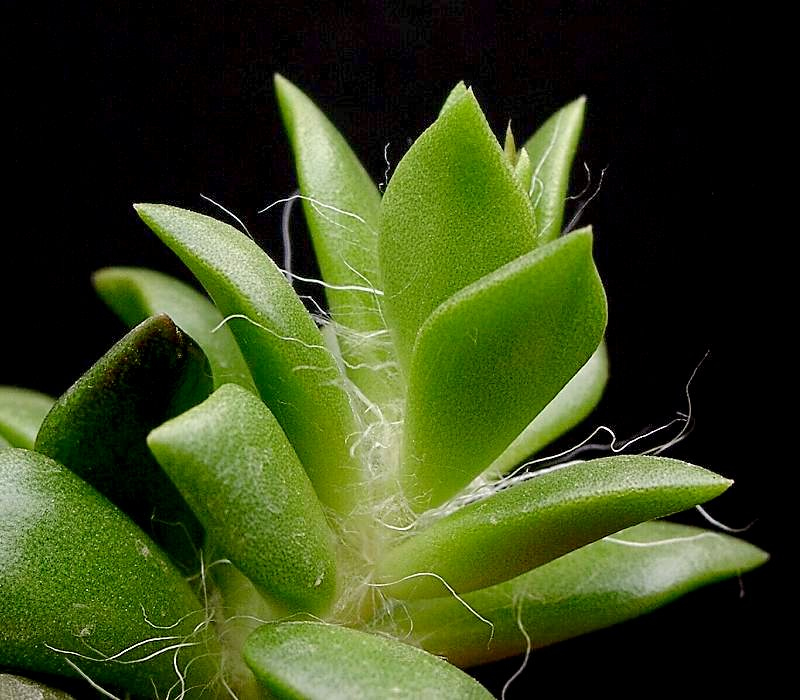
- Anacampseros rufescens

Scientific classification
- Kingdom: Plantae
- Clade: Tracheophytes
- Clade: Angiosperms
- Clade: Eudicots
- Order: Caryophyllales
- Family: Anacampserotaceae
- Genus: Anacampseros; L.

Species
- See text

= Anacampseros =

Genus of plants

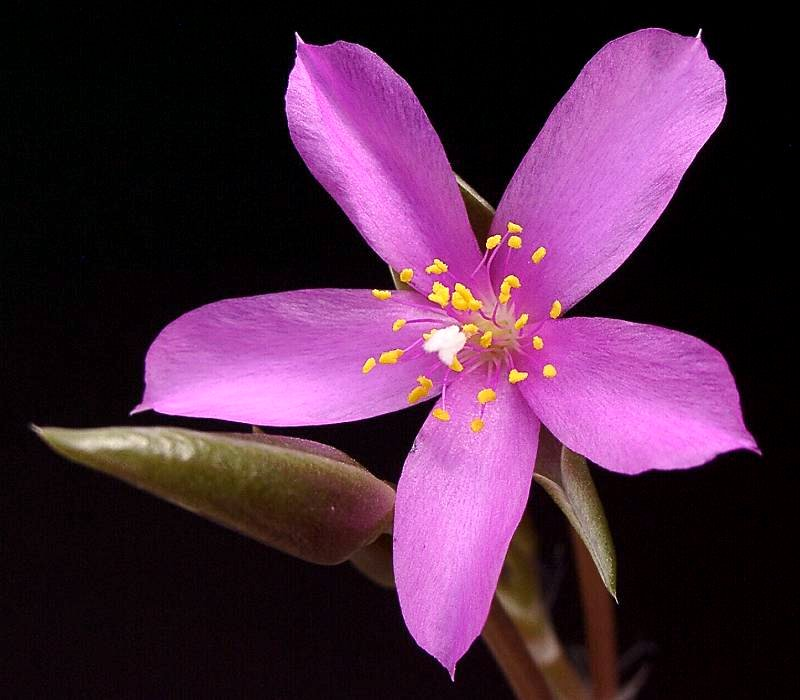
The flower of Anacampseros rufescens is typical of the genus

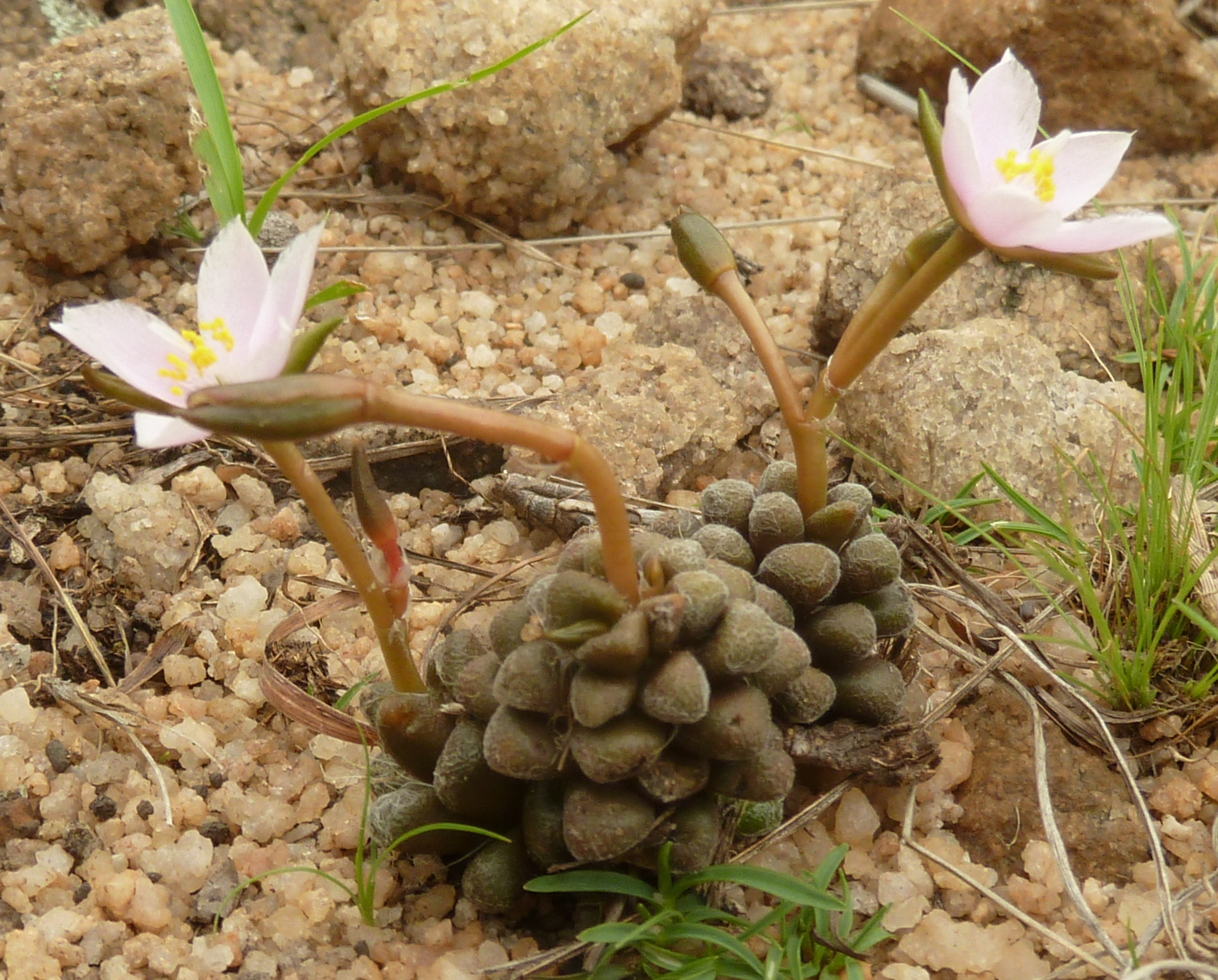
Anacampseros subnuda illustrates one of the many variations in habitus within the genus

Anacampseros L. is a genus in the Anacampseros family comprising about a hundred species of small perennial succulent plants native to Southern Africa, Ethiopia and Latin America. The botanical name Anacampseros is an ancient one for herbs supposed to restore lost love.

The Australian species Grahamia australiana was at one time included in the genus Anacampseros, but the entire genus now is regarded as Southern African, and no longer includes any Australian representatives.

== Description ==
Plants in the genus Anacampseros are perennial. In habit they are small undershrubs or sprawling herbs that may form dense mats. Mature plants of many of the species form a small caudex or a tuberous root-stock. The leaves of most species are succulent and may be either lanceolate in shape or rounded. The arrangement of leaves on a stem is alternate. The leaves in most species are closely spaced, and in some species they are small and more or less hidden by papery or filamentous fascicled stipules. Some species have sessile flowers, often in an involucre. Other species bear their flowers on racemose peduncles. In contrast to the alternately born leaves, the bracts are opposite and scarious. The flowers are actinomorphic with two caducous sepals and five fugacious petals. The petals may be white, pink, or even pale purple. The plants flower from time to time in summer, and open on sunny days only. The numerous stamens are attached to the bases of the petals. The style is split into three. The ovary is superior, and ripens into a three-valved unilocular capsule that contains many seeds on a free-standing central placenta. In some species the three valves are misleadingly split into six valves. The seeds are compressed and may be angled or have three wings.

== Taxonomy ==
Anacampseros is now a genus in the family Anacampserotaceae, whereas until about 2010 it had been considered a member of Portulacaceae.

Anacampseros Mill. is a synonym of the genus Sedum, which is in a different plant family, Crassulaceae.

=== Species ===
The following species were listed as accepted in the Kew Gardens Plant list at the start of 2016.

- Anacampseros affinis H.Pearson & Stephens
- Anacampseros albidiflora Poelln.
- Anacampseros albissima Marloth
- Anacampseros alstonii Schönland
- Anacampseros alta Poelln.
- Anacampseros arachnoides (Haw.) Sims
- Anacampseros bayeriana S.A.Hammer
- Anacampseros coahuilensis (S.Watson) Eggli & Nyffeler
- Anacampseros comptonii Pillans
- Anacampseros crinita Dinter
- Anacampseros decipiens Poelln.
- Anacampseros densifolia Dinter ex Poelln.
- Anacampseros depauperata (A.Berger) Poelln.
- Anacampseros dielsiana Dinter
- Anacampseros dinteri Schinz
- Anacampseros filamentosa (Haw.) Sims
- Anacampseros fissa Poelln.
- Anacampseros gracilis Poelln.
- Anacampseros herreana Poelln.
- Anacampseros hillii G.Will.
- Anacampseros karasmontana Dinter
- Anacampseros kurtzii Bacig.
- Anacampseros lanceolata (Haw.) Sweet
- Anacampseros lanigera Burch.
- Anacampseros mallei (G.Will.) G.Will.
- Anacampseros marlothii Poelln.
- Anacampseros meyeri Poelln.
- Anacampseros namaquensis H.Pearson & Stephens
- Anacampseros nebrownii Poelln.
- Anacampseros nitida Poelln.
- Anacampseros papyracea E.Mey. ex Fenzl
- Anacampseros papyracea subsp. namaensis Gerbaulet
- Anacampseros paradoxa Poelln.
- Anacampseros parviflora Poelln.
- Anacampseros pisina G.Will.
- Anacampseros prominens G.Will.
- Anacampseros quinaria E.Mey. ex Fenzl
- Anacampseros recurvata Schönland
- Anacampseros recurvata subsp. buderiana (Poelln.) Gerbaulet
- Anacampseros recurvata subsp. minuta Gerbaulet
- Anacampseros retusa Poelln.
- Anacampseros rhodesica N.E.Br.
- Anacampseros rubroviridis Poelln.
- Anacampseros rufescens (Haw.) Sweet
- Anacampseros ruschii Dinter & Poelln.
- Anacampseros schoenlandii Poelln.
- Anacampseros scopata G.Will.
- Anacampseros starkiana Poelln.
- Anacampseros subnuda Poelln.
- Anacampseros subnuda subsp. lubbersii (Bleck) Gerbaulet
- Anacampseros telephiastrum DC.
- Anacampseros tomentosa A.Berger
- Anacampseros truncata Poelln.
- Anacampseros ustulata E.Mey. ex Fenzl
- Anacampseros vanthielii G.Will.
- Anacampseros variabilis Poelln.
- Anacampseros vespertina Thulin
- Anacampseros vulcanensis Añon
- Anacampseros wischkonii Dinter & Poelln.
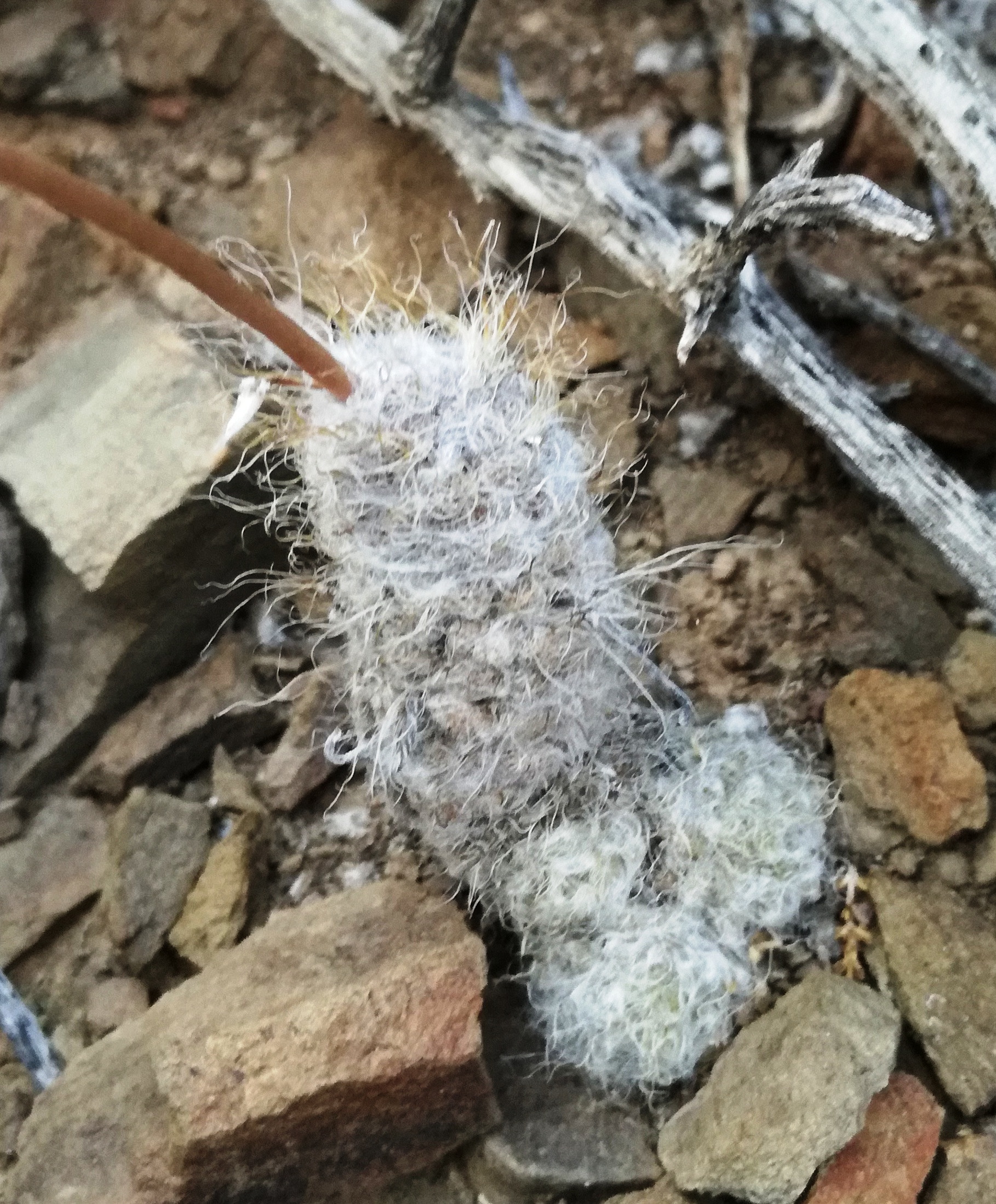
Anacampseros albidiflora

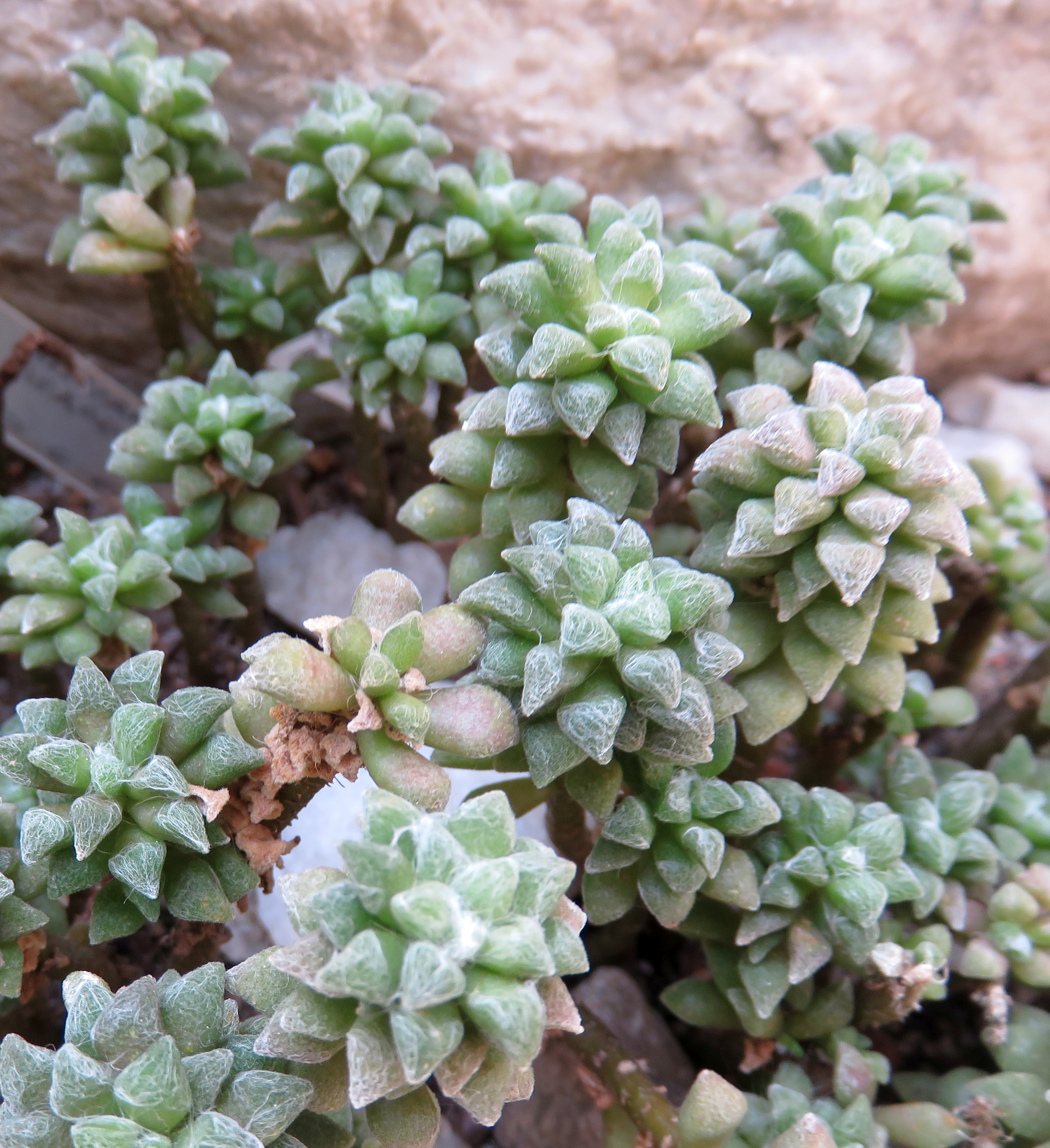
Anacampseros arachnoides (Little Karoo) has pink-to-white flowers and compact, ovoid, hairy leaves, each with a minute acuminate spine.

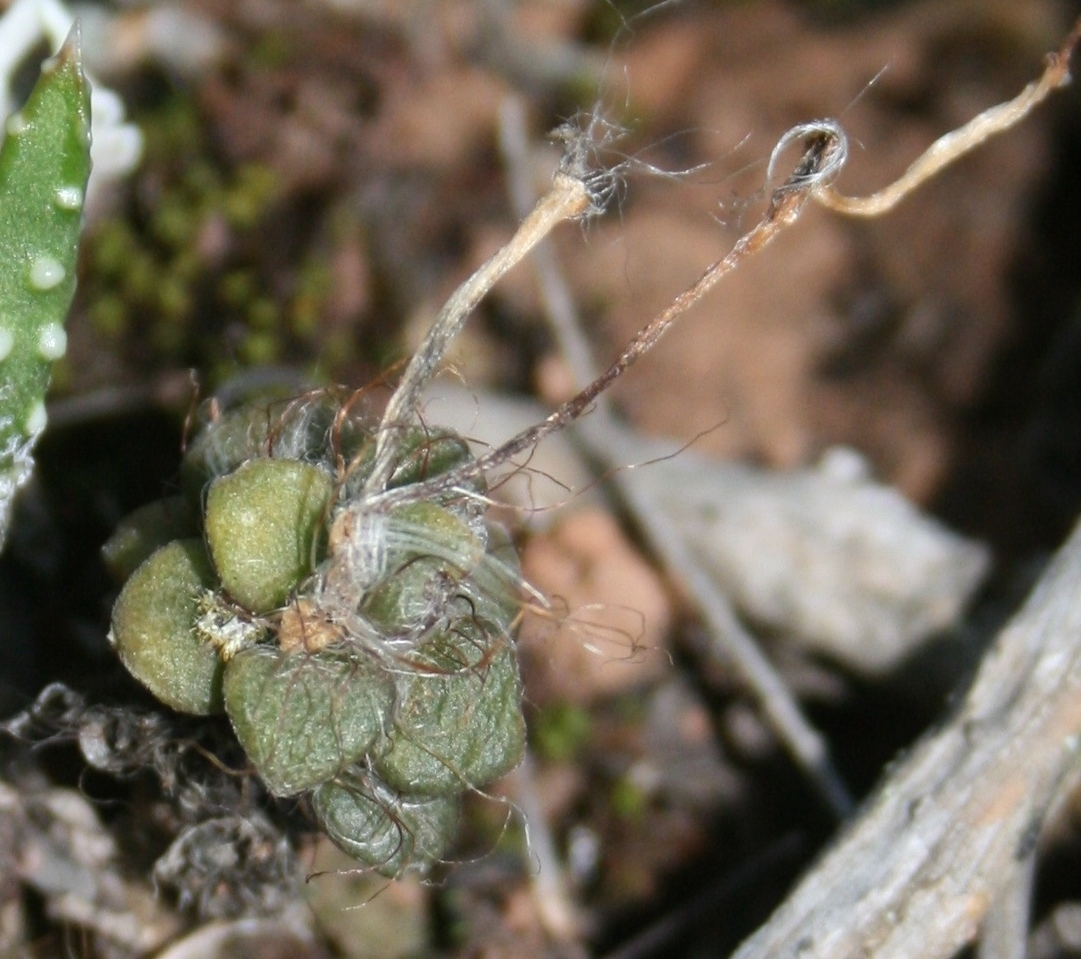
Anacampseros retusa

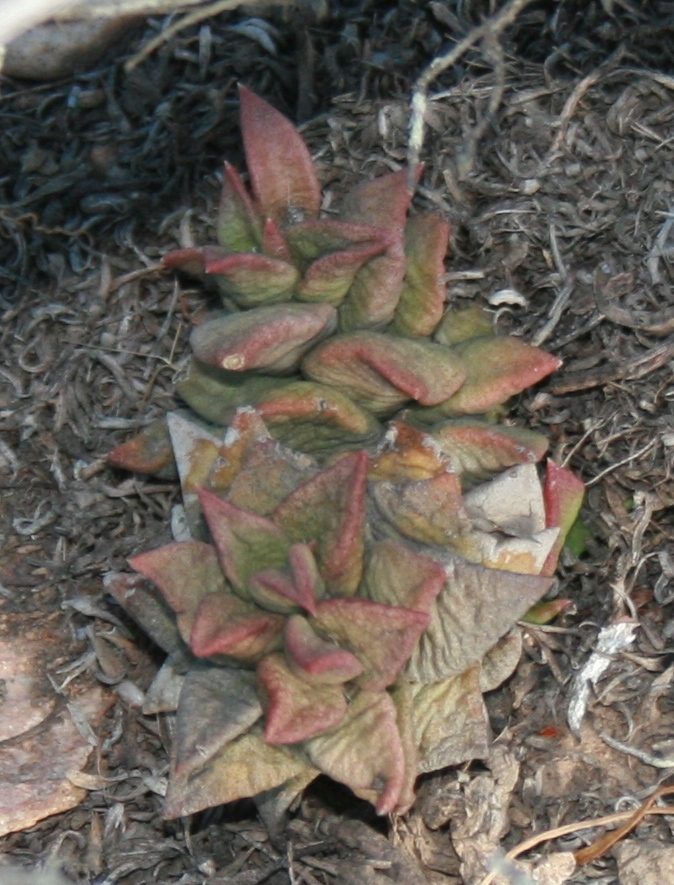
Anacampseros lanceolata (Western Cape) has smooth, hairless, acute-tipped leaves, and a branched inflorescence with broadly ovate petals, 30-45 stamens per flower and

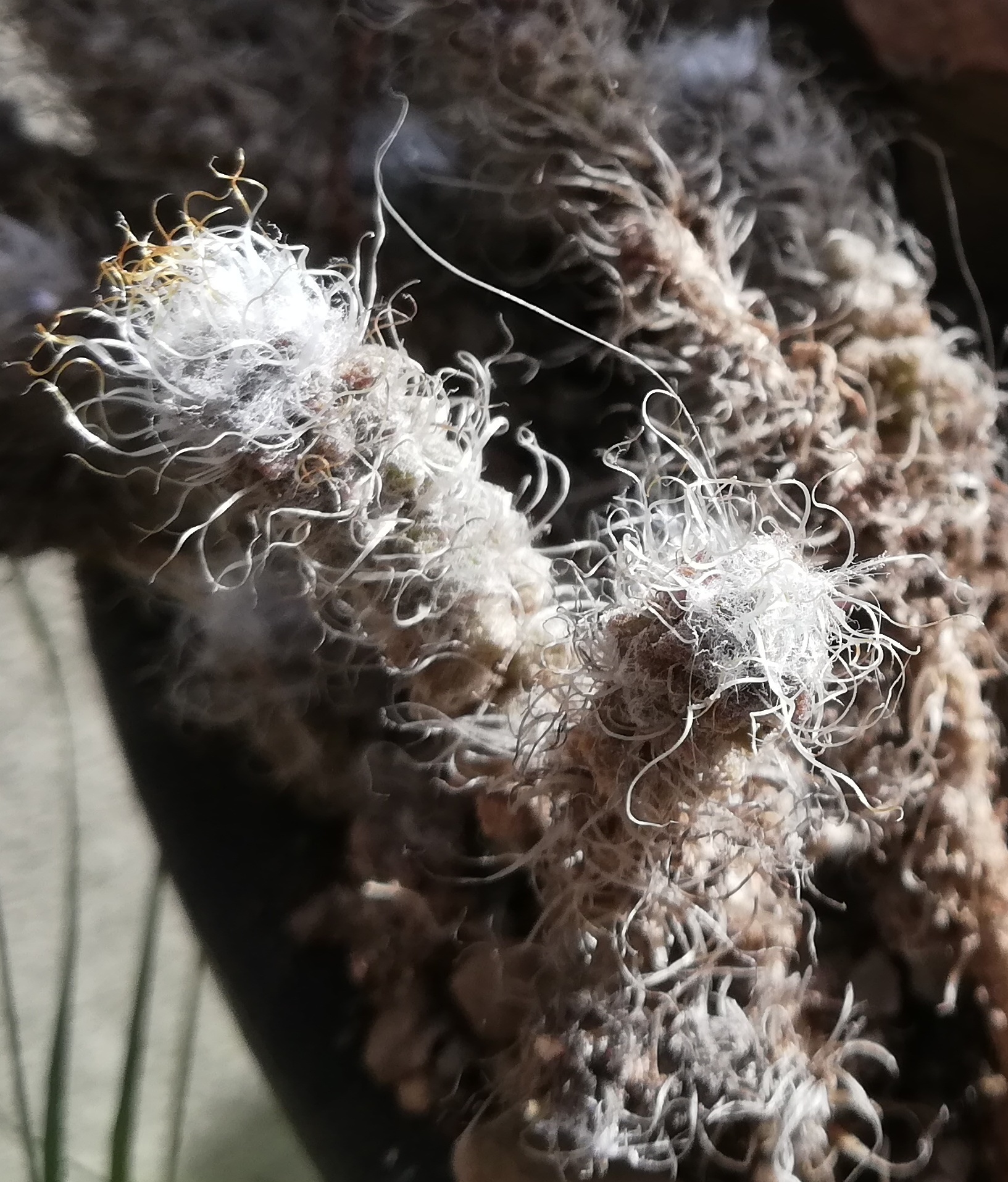
Anacampseros filamentosa (Northern Cape and Namibia) has hairy, rounded-truncate leaves and slender elliptic-lanceolate petals on its uniformly pink flowers.

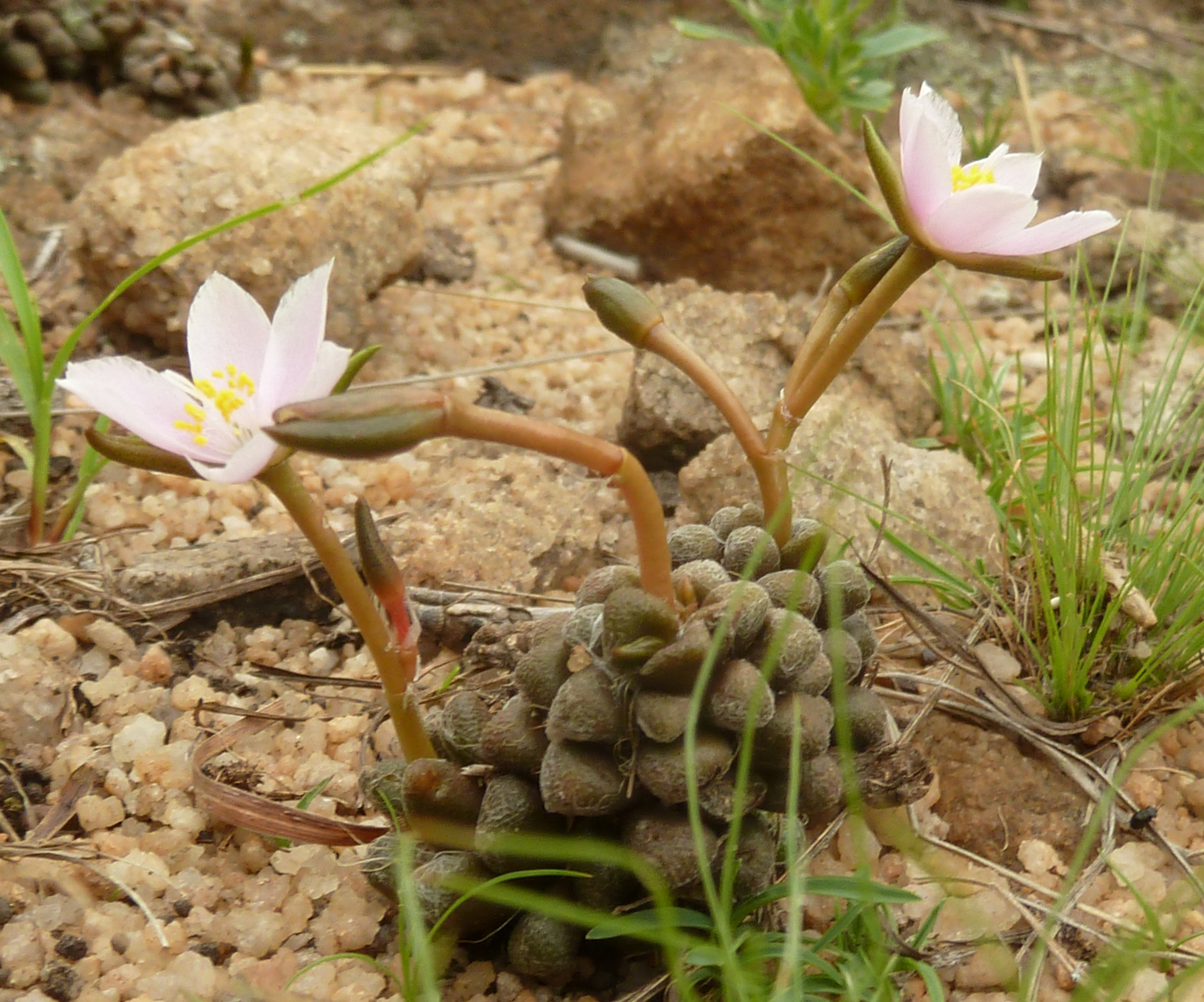
Anacampseros subnuda has obtuse-tipped leaves, that lose their velt-hair, becoming smooth with age.

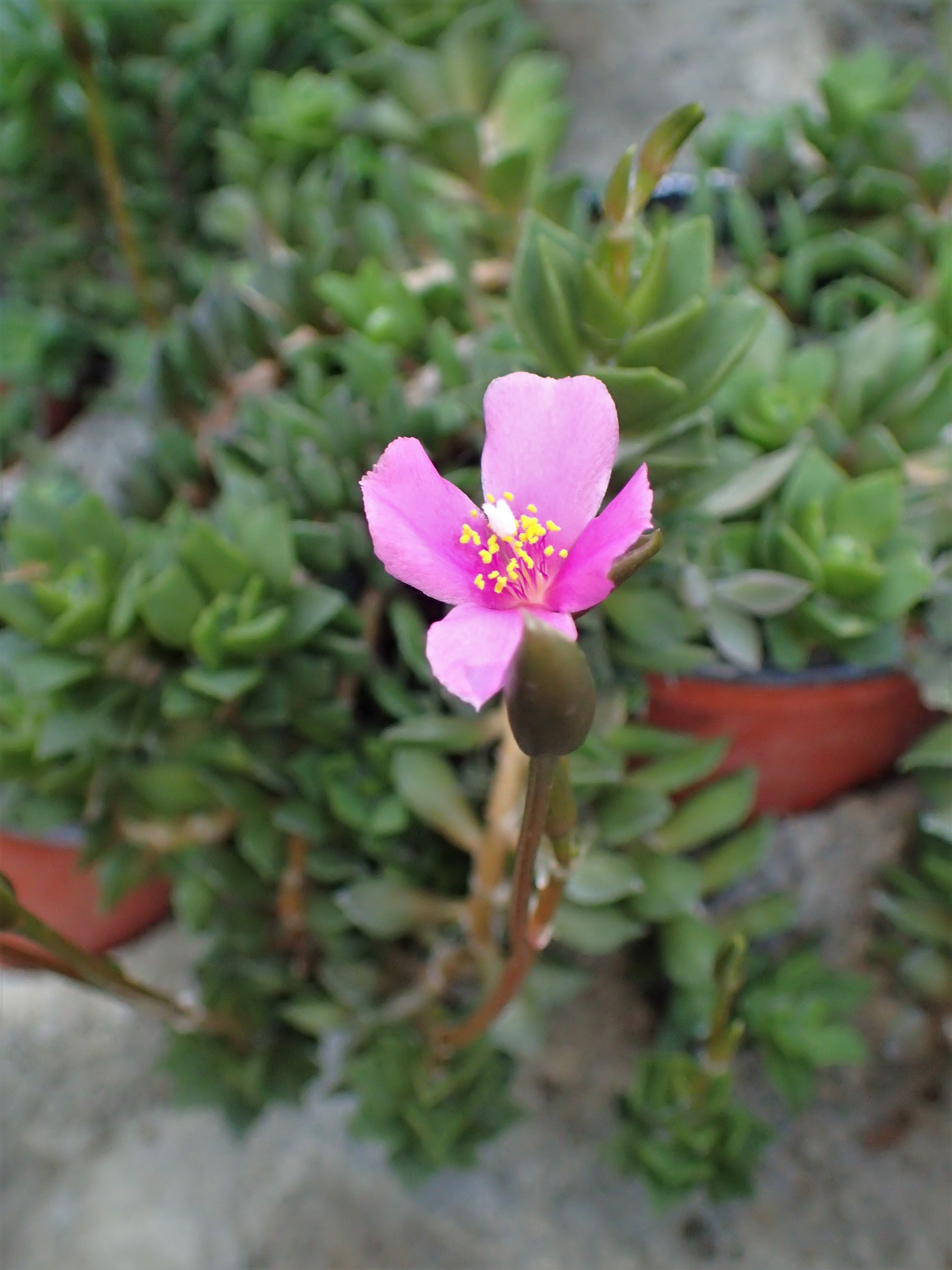
Anacampseros rufescens (Eastern Cape Province) a pink-flowered species. Leaf undersides are usually reddish and it has numerous axillary hairs.

Anacampseros rufescens 'sunris'

== Uses and significance ==
Folk uses and views on the genus are incoherent and regional. Some species are regarded as narcotic or outright poisonous, but tests on sheep gave no positive result and some of the notionally toxic species are used in adulterating beer. Several species have been used in making various forms of beer, but it is not clear what the intended effect might be, although some species appears to have some activity in hydrolysing some carbohydrates. Some species are used as charms and non-specific "medicines".
