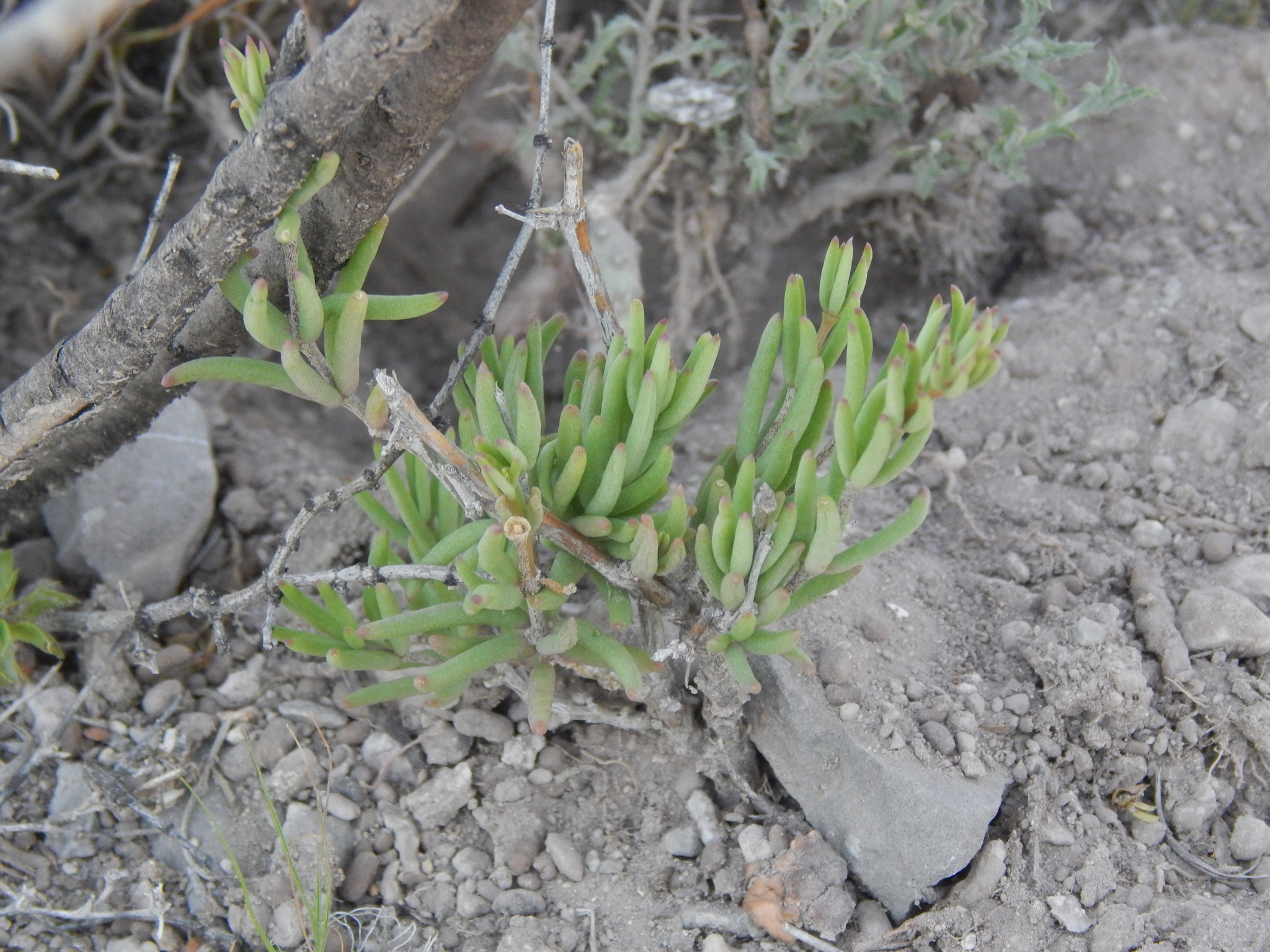
- Talinopsis frutescens

Conservation status
- Apparently Secure (NatureServe)

Scientific classification
- Kingdom: Plantae
- Clade: Embryophytes
- Clade: Tracheophytes
- Clade: Angiosperms
- Clade: Eudicots
- Order: Caryophyllales
- Family: Anacampserotaceae
- Genus: Talinopsis; A.Gray
- Species: T. frutescens

Binomial name
- Talinopsis frutescens A.Gray

Synonyms
- Grahamia frutescens (A.Gray) G.D.Rowley

= Talinopsis =

Genus of flowering plants

Talinopsis is a genus of flowering plants in the family Anacampserotaceae. It has only one currently accepted species, Talinopsis frutescens, native to the US states on New Mexico and Texas, and northeast, central and southwest Mexico. A succulent, it uses C_{3} carbon fixation.
