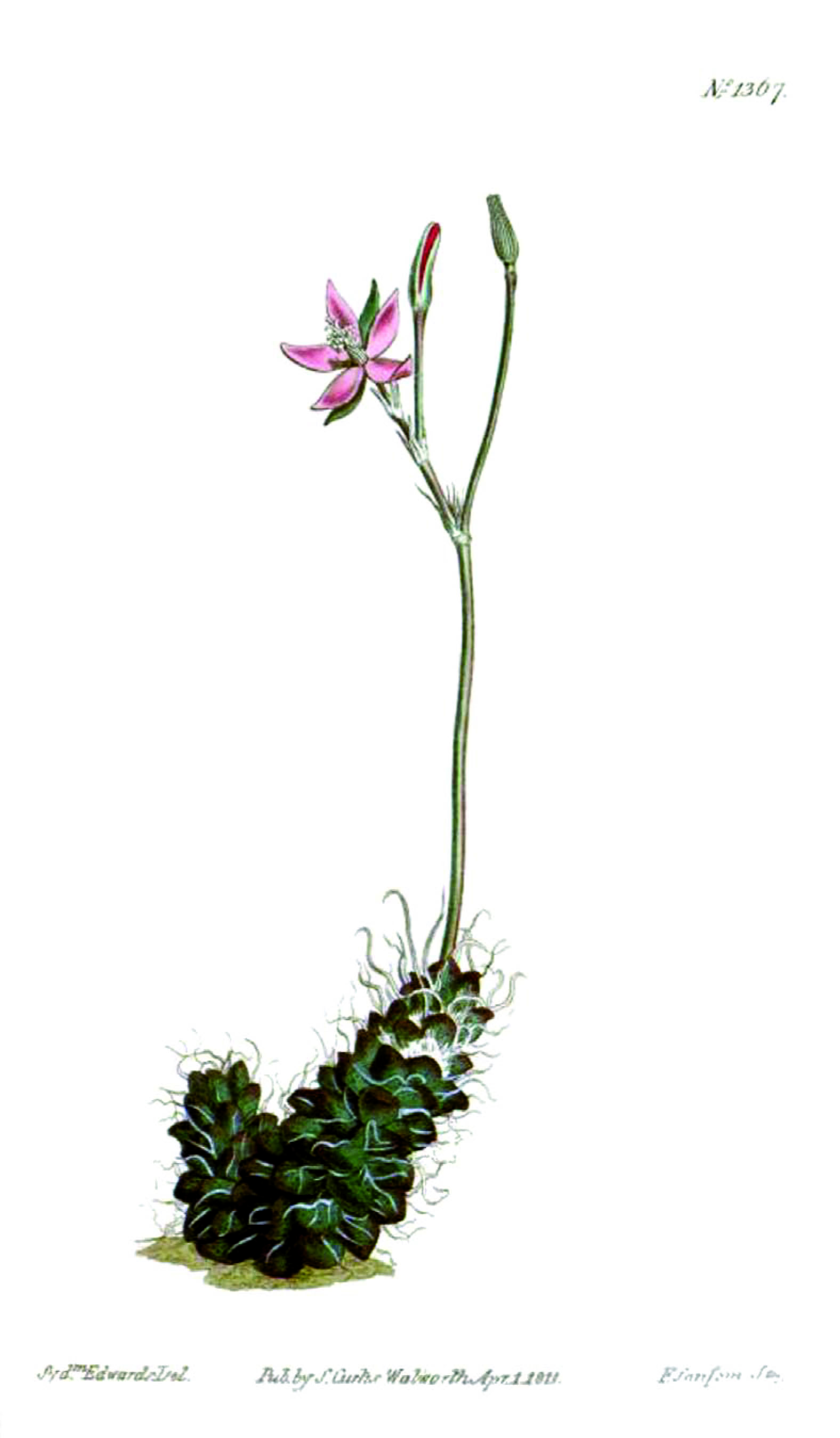
- Illustration of Anacampseros filamentosa in Curtis’s Botanical Magazine

Scientific classification
- Kingdom: Plantae
- Clade: Tracheophytes
- Clade: Angiosperms
- Clade: Eudicots
- Order: Caryophyllales
- Family: Anacampserotaceae
- Genus: Anacampseros
- Species: A. filamentosa

Binomial name
- Anacampseros filamentosa (Haw.) Sims

= Anacampseros filamentosa =

Species of plant

Anacampseros filamentosa is a species of succulent plant native to the Karoo region of South Africa.

== Description ==
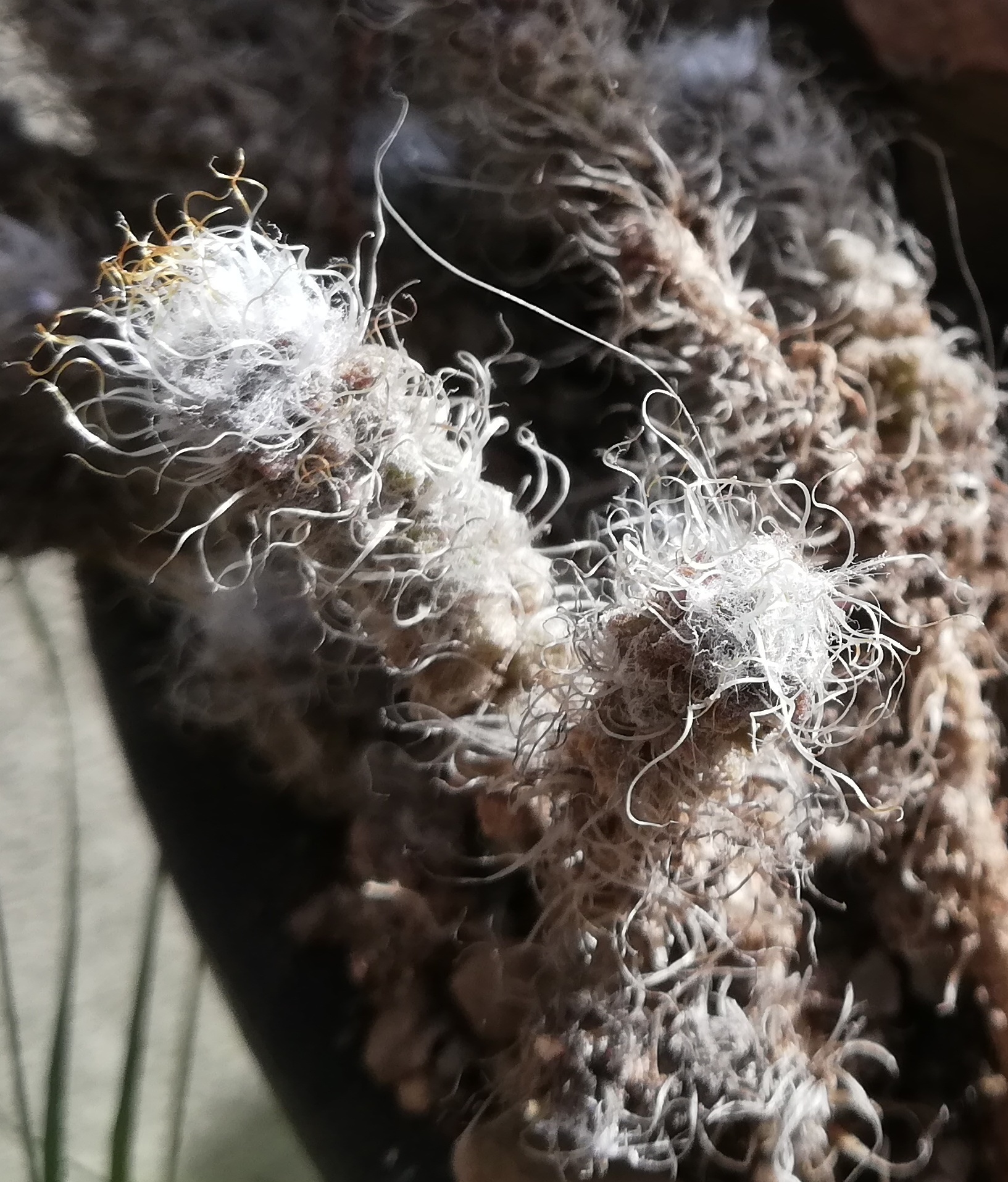
Detail of the densely hairy stems of An. filamentosa.

This plant forms clusters of tiny stems, each covered in densely-packed, round leaves.

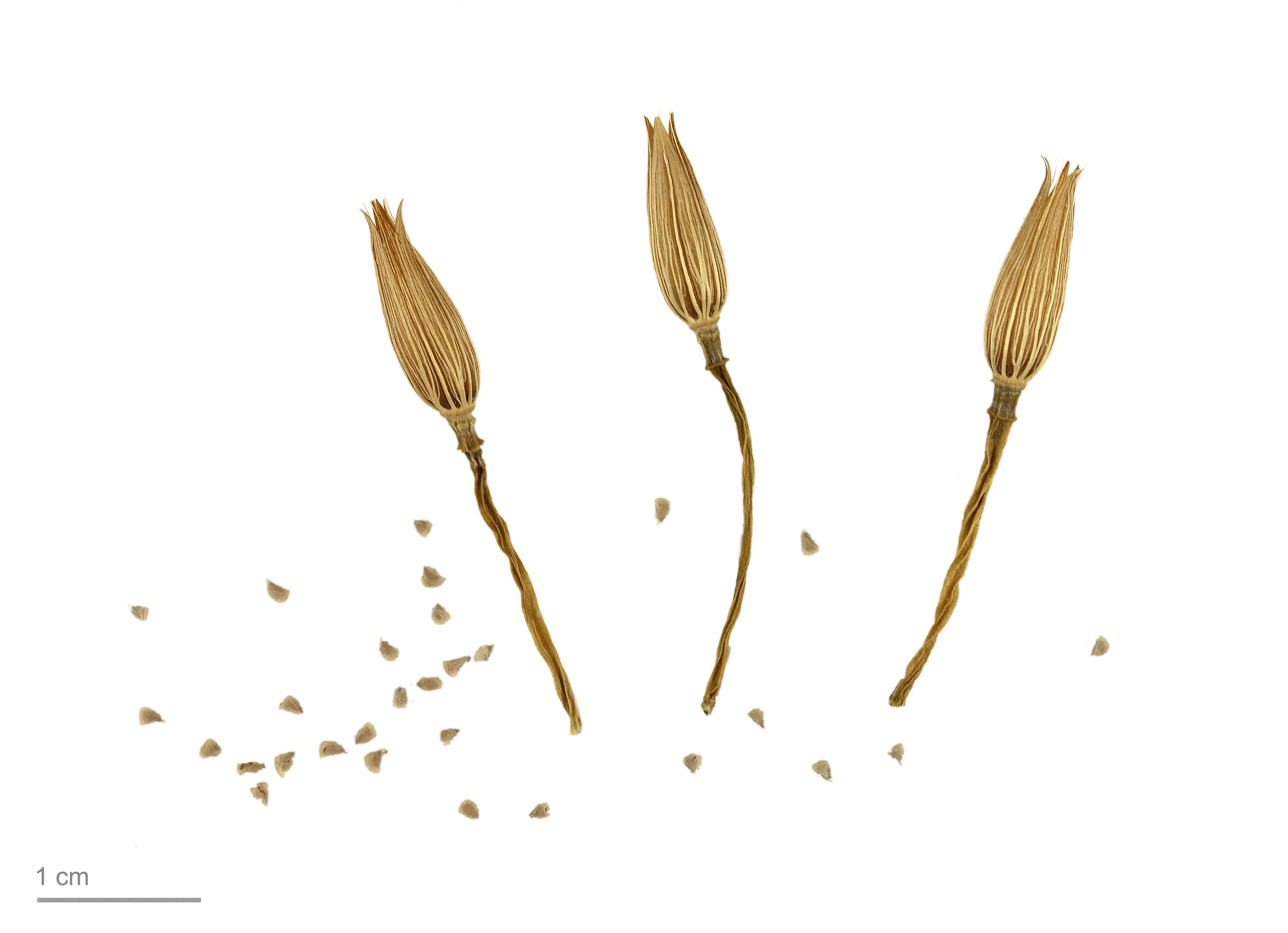
Anacampseros filamentosa MHNT

Each leaf is almost a sphere in shape, but has a tiny, down-turned "chin" at its tip. The leaves, and the entire plant, are covered in a dense coat of hair, giving it a white colour. Additionally, a few longer, bristly hairs extend further out (though in the northern part of its range, the namaquensis subspecies has shorter bristles that do not extend further than the leaves).

The flowers are pink.
