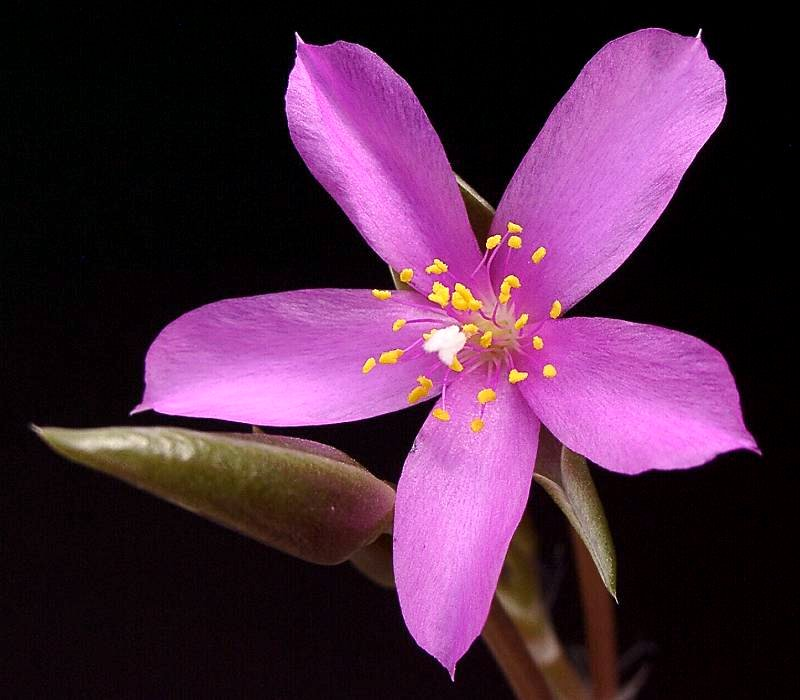
- Anacampseros rufescens flower

Scientific classification
- Kingdom: Plantae
- Clade: Tracheophytes
- Clade: Angiosperms
- Clade: Eudicots
- Order: Caryophyllales
- Family: Anacampserotaceae; Eggli & Nyffeler

Type genus
- Anacampseros L.

Genera
- Anacampseros; Grahamia; Talinopsis

= Anacampserotaceae =

Family of plants

The Anacampserotaceae is a family of succulent plants under the Portulacineae subgroup. Species can be found in South African regions. The family was described by Urs Eggli and Reto Nyffeler in their analysis of the polyphyly in the suborder Portulacineae (order Caryophyllales). Genetic research led to the discovery of the ACPT clade where the Anacampserotaceae family is placed. Species can interchangeably switch photosynthetic pathways based on environmental water stress. The three recognized genera - Anacampseros, Grahamia, and Talinopsis - were formerly placed in the Portulacaceae. This family was accepted in the Angiosperm Phylogeny Group's 2009 publication of the APG III system.

== Description ==
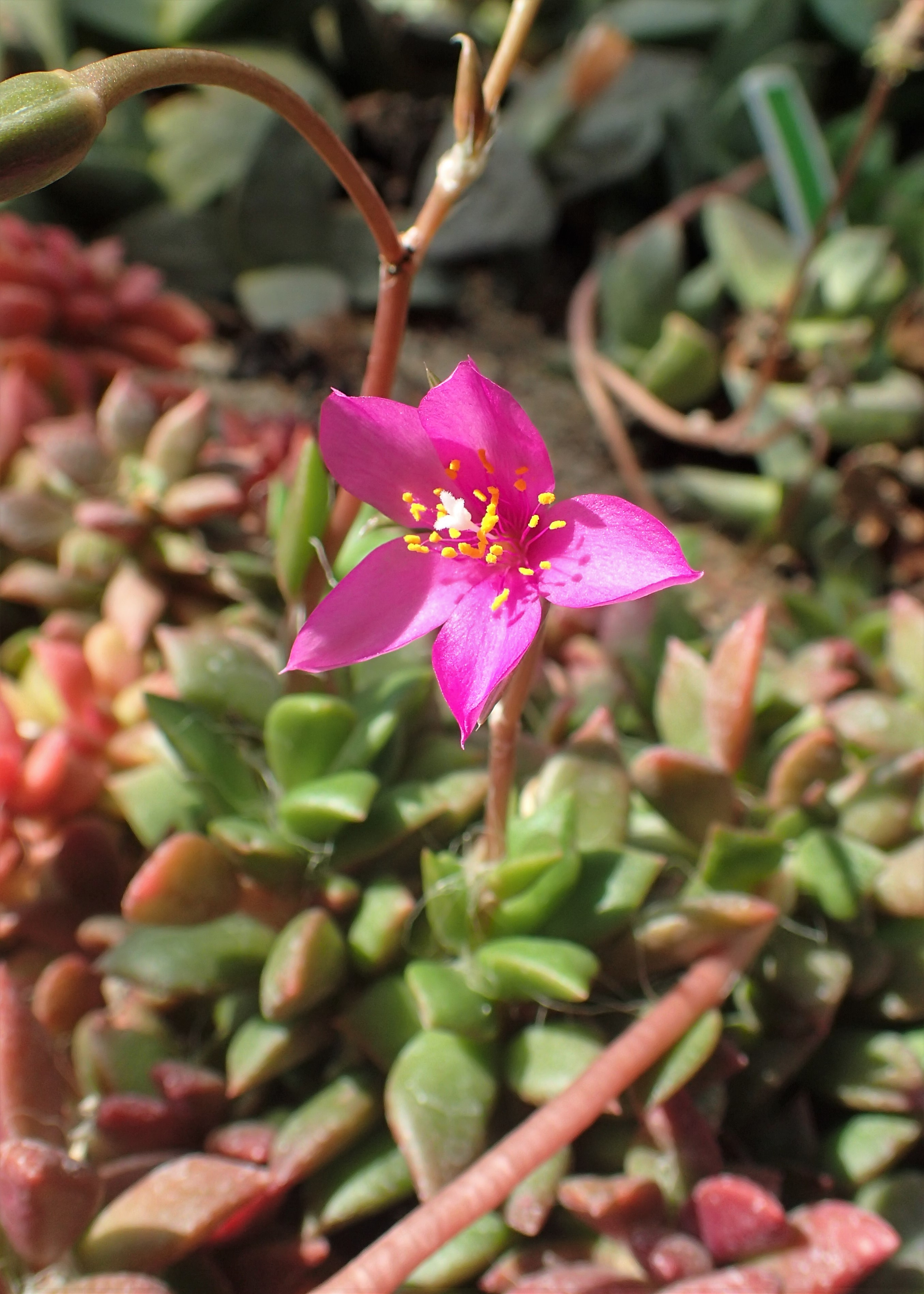
Author: Krzysztof Ziarnek, Kenraiz

The Anacampserotaceae family is within the suborder Portulacineae. A shared trait within the family is succulent leaves and seed production. Flowers are generally bisexual with a superior ovary, a perianth in 2 whorls of 2 sepals and 5 petals. Species within the family have shown positive resiliency to drought environmental factors.

== Taxon history ==
Accepted in the APG III system, the Anacampserotaceae family placement in the taxon was further researched due to conflicting relationships with other families under the Portulacineae. Using genetic markers Nyffeler and Eggli conducted research on the subgroup Portulacineae and found positive support for a clade within the subgroup comprising Anacampserotaceae, Cactaceae, Portulacaceae, and Talinaceae. The clade was then formally known as the ACPT clade, as referred by many studies thereafter. A study conducted by Maria Oliveira Marinho et al. The study researched specifically the ACPT clade using chromosomal data. The study resulted with further positive support for the ACPT clade existence. Information was discovered in regard to the order within the ACPT clade, the results showed that Talinaceae was the first family to diverge from the group, and Cactaceae is sister to both Anacampserotaceae and Portulacaceae which form a monophyletic group together. The Anacampserotaceae has three genera in the family named Grahamia, Anacampseros, and Talinopsis.

== Morphology ==
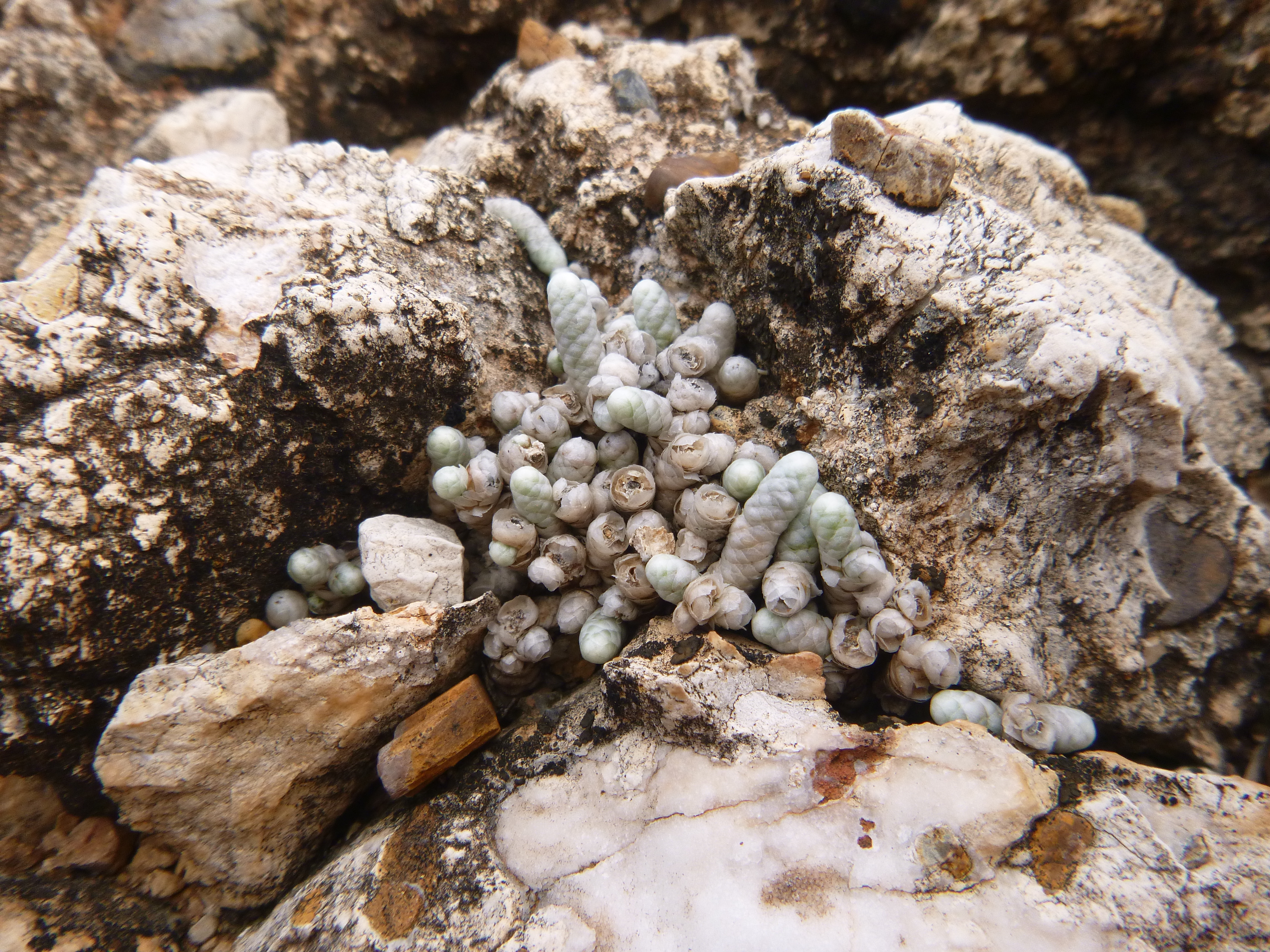
Author: Ian D. Medeiros

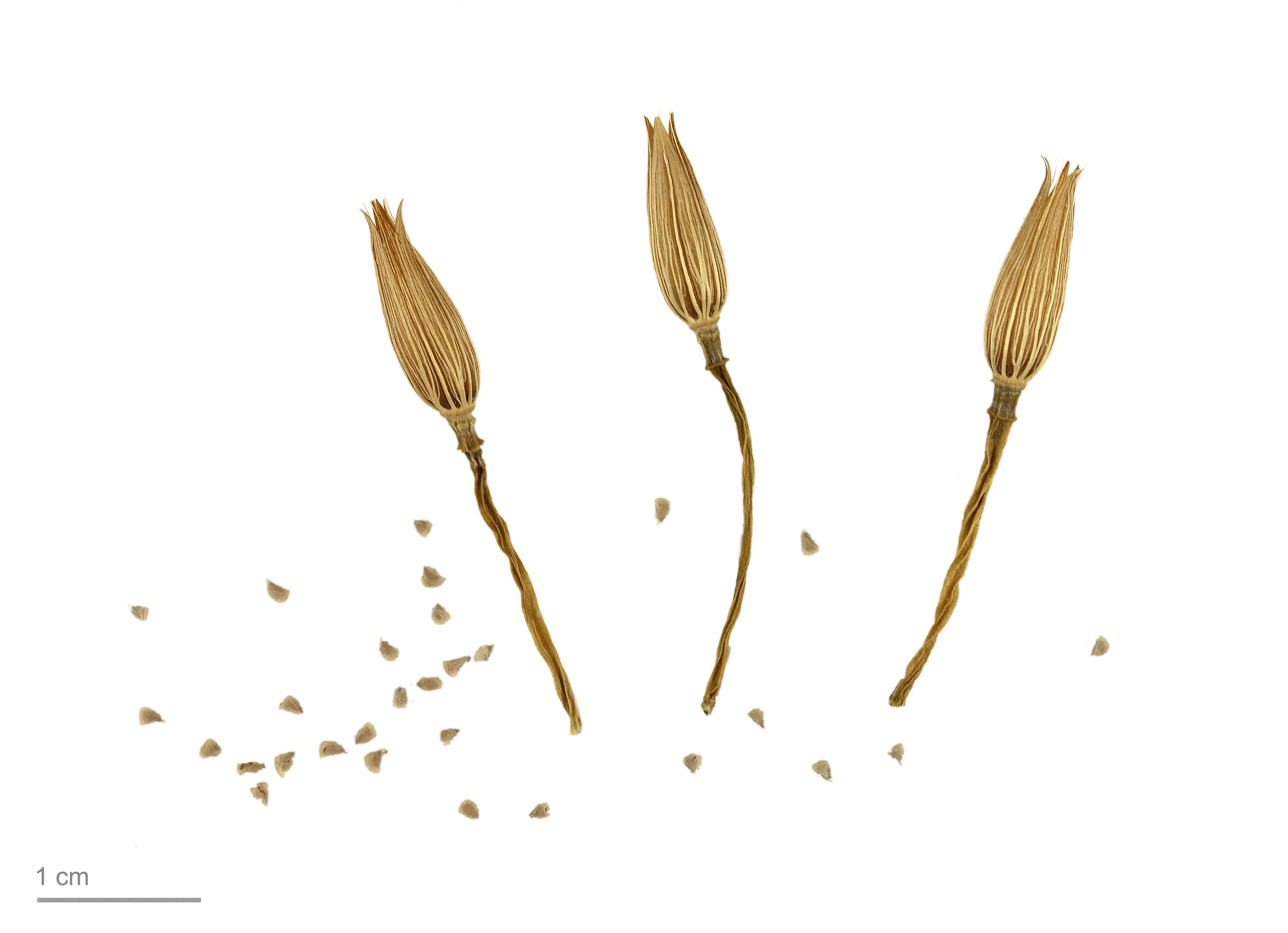
Photographer: Roger Culos

Succulent leaves can take many forms, in Anacampserotaceae there are species ranging from cylindrical like in Avonia to ovate leaves seen in Anacampseros rufescens. The cylindrical leaves can also have distinct differences such as scales, which can differ between species. The succulent leaves also can contain anthocyanin which can create a different pigmentation around or different parts of the succulent leaves. Species within the Anacampserotaceae family are seed producing. The endocarps valves form a basket like capsule that holds the produced angular shape seeds.

== Photosynthesis ==
Succulent plant leaves provide the structure for the ability to adapt multiple photosynthesis pathways, but not always all of the photosynthetic pathways are inherited. In a research study conducted by Lonnie J. Guralnick et al. experimental data uncovered that although C4 is one of the photosynthetic pathways succulent leaves are able to undergo, this has only been observed in Portulacaceae. In the Anacampserotaceae family, research data supported the expression of C3 and facultative CAM photosynthesis. Species having facultative CAM have the ability to interchange between C3 and CAM, this has contributed to the survivability of species within the Anacampserotaceae in drought environments. The reason being that In drought conditions, species express CAM, while in normal watering conditions the C3 pathway is preferred.

== Habitat ==
Species of the Anacampserotaceae family have been observed in the wild in places like the Northern Cape in South Africa. Some species in South Africa can be found near or on rocks, and in shrublands. Terrain conditions of South Africa can range from dry to arid.
