= Portulacaria carrissoana =

Conservation status
- Least Concern (IUCN 3.1)

Scientific classification
- Kingdom: Plantae
- Clade: Tracheophytes
- Clade: Angiosperms
- Clade: Eudicots
- Order: Caryophyllales
- Family: Didiereaceae
- Genus: Portulacaria
- Species: P. carrissoana

Binomial name
- Portulacaria carrissoana (Exell & Mendonça) Bruyns &

Synonyms
- Ceraria carrissoana Exell & Mendonça; Ceraria kuneneana Swanepoel

Species of succulent plant

Portulacaria carrissoana (previously Ceraria carrissoana or Ceraria kuneneana) is a shrubby succulent plant found on the border between Namibia and Angola.

== Description ==
It is a soft-wooded, succulent shrub with flat, round leaves and bisexual flowers.
