= Mischogyne =

Scientific classification
- Kingdom: Plantae
- Clade: Tracheophytes
- Clade: Angiosperms
- Clade: Magnoliids
- Order: Magnoliales
- Family: Annonaceae
- Subfamily: Annonoideae
- Tribe: Monodoreae
- Genus: Mischogyne; Exell

Genus of plants

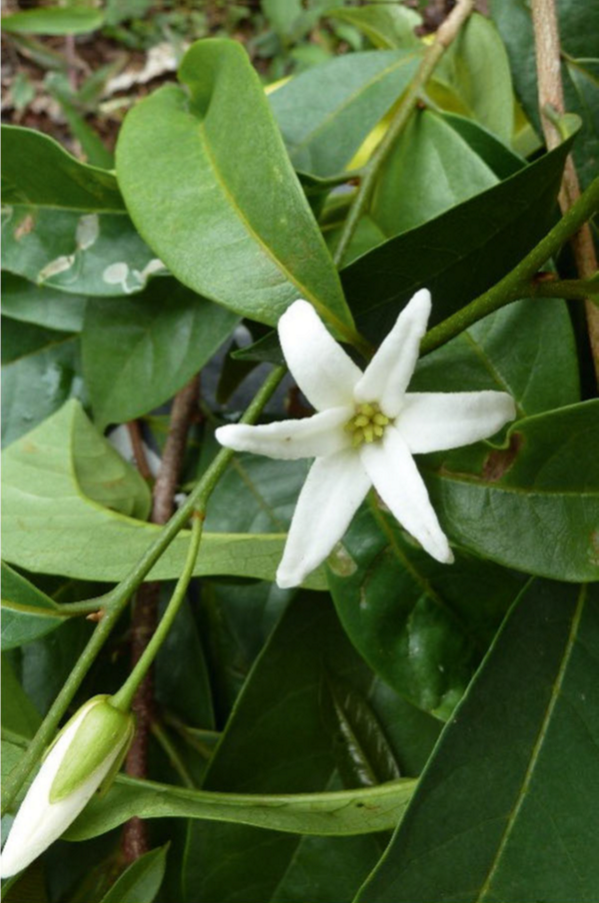
Mischogyne elliotiana.

Mischogyne is a genus of plants in the family Annonaceae. It comprises five species distributed in Angola, Cameroon, Gabon, Ghana, Guinea, Guinea-Bissau, Ivory Coast, Liberia, Nigeria, Sierra Leone, Democratic Republic of the Congo. Arthur Wallis Exell the British botanist who first formally described the genus named it after the stalks (μίσχος, míschos, in Greek) that bears its reproductive (γυνή, gunḗ, in Greek) structures.

== Description ==
Mischogyne are bushes or small trees. Their trunks are straight or branching from the base. They have elliptical to oval leaves that are arranged in an alternate phyllotaxy. The leaves are paper to leathery with a dark green upper surface and a lighter green underside. The leaves can be hairless or covered in fine downy hairs. Their inflorescences have 1-2 flowers and are extra-axillary or terminal. Their flowers have both male and female reproductive structures. Their flowers have 3 sepals that either touch one another at their margins, or are fused until anthesis. Their flowers have 6 white, oval petals arranged in two rows of three. In the flowers, the receptacles form columns that bear stamens at their base and carpels at their apex. Each flower has numerous stamens that are arranged in a spiral phyllotaxy. The stamens have little or no filament, are linear, and deshisce laterally. The thecae extend along nearly the entire length of the stamen. The connective tissue between the thecae can be hairless or covered in fine downy hairs, and can sometimes terminate in a tuft of hairs at the apex of the stamen. The flowers have 3-40 cylindrical or oval carpels that are densely covered in fine downy hairs. The styles are short. The stigmas have two lobes. The carpels have numerous ovules. The fruit can be round, ellipsoidal or oblong and either hairless or covered in fine downy hairs. The fruit can be smooth or ribbed. The fruit have 3-12 seeds per carpel. The seeds are flat ellipsoids.

== Species ==
Species include:

- Mischogyne congensis Gosline
- Mischogyne elliotiana (Engl. & Diels) R.E.Fr. ex Le Thomas
- Mischogyne gabonensis (Le Thomas) Gosline
- Mischogyne iddii Gosline & A.R.Marshall Marshall
- Mischogyne michelioides Exell
