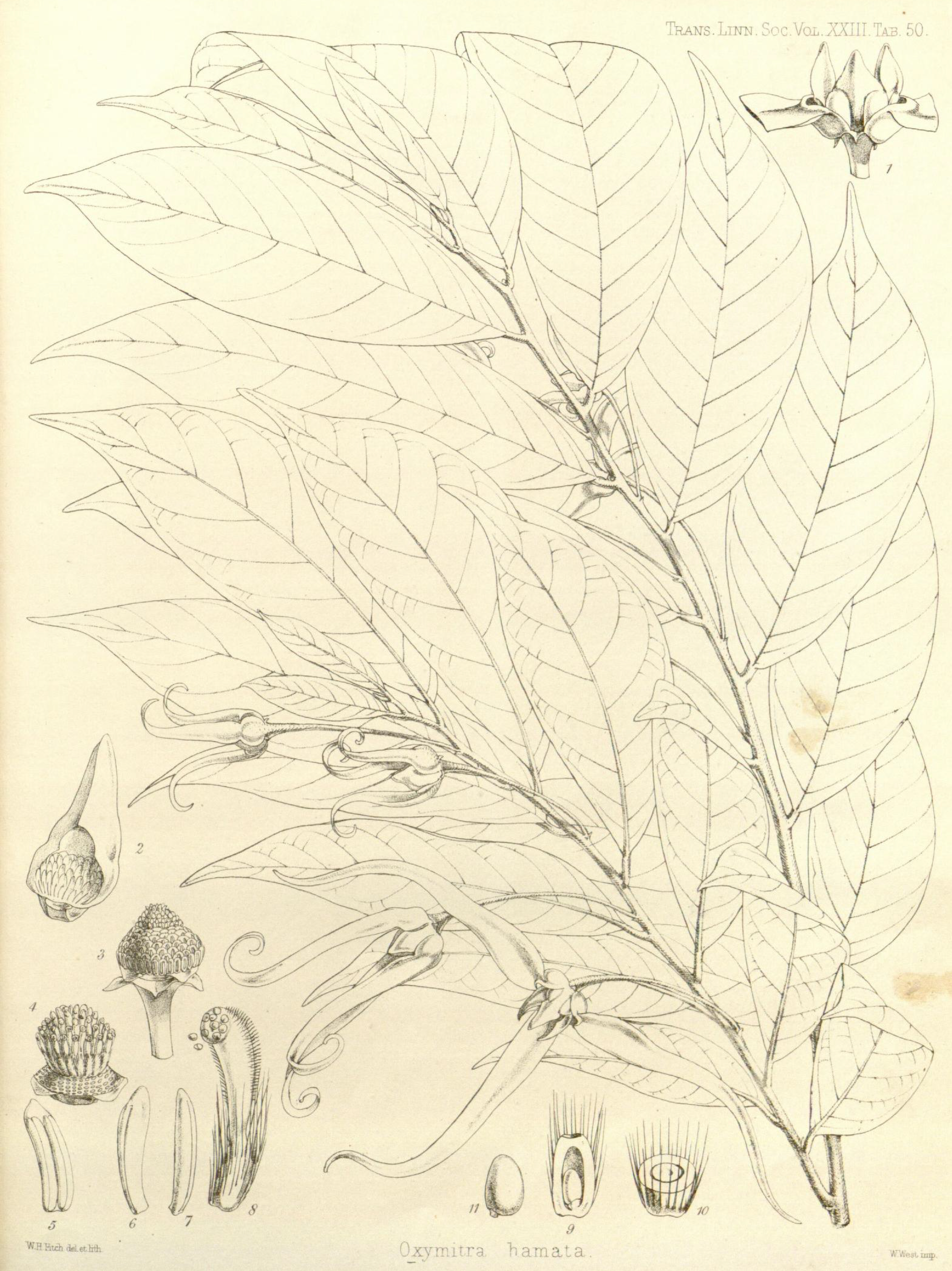
- Black and white botanical illustration of Neostenanthera hamata (using the synonym Oxymitra hamata).

Conservation status
- Least Concern (IUCN 3.1)

Scientific classification
- Kingdom: Plantae
- Clade: Embryophytes
- Clade: Tracheophytes
- Clade: Spermatophytes
- Clade: Angiosperms
- Clade: Magnoliids
- Order: Magnoliales
- Family: Annonaceae
- Genus: Neostenanthera
- Species: N. hamata

Binomial name
- Neostenanthera hamata (Benth.) Exell

Synonyms
- Neostenanthera yalensis (Hutch. & Dalziel ex G.P.Cooper & Record) Hutch. & Dalziel; Oxymitra hamata Benth.; Stenanthera hamata (Benth.) Engl. & Diels; Stenanthera yalensis Hutch. & Dalziel ex G.P.Cooper & Record

= Neostenanthera hamata =

Species of flowering plant

Neostenanthera hamata is a species of plant in the family Annonaceae. It is found in Ivory Coast, Ghana, Liberia, and Sierra Leone. George Bentham, the English botanist who first formally described the species, using the basionym Oxymitra hamata, did not explicitly explain the specific epithet, but it has distinctive outer petals with hooked (hamatus in Latin) tips.

== Description ==
It is a tree reaching 25 meters in height. Its elliptical to lance-shaped leaves are 4.5-17.8 by 1.3-5.4 centimeters. The tips of the leaves taper to a point, and their bases are blunt to wedge-shaped. The upper surface of the leaves are dark green and hairless to slightly hairy, their lower surface is pale waxy blue to brown and slightly hairy. The leaves have 9-14 pairs of secondary veins emanating from their midribs. Its petioles are 3-6 by 0.8-2 millimeters and covered in fine hairs. It has solitary flowers that are positioned on the stem, often opposite from leaves. The flowers are born on 31-45 millimeter long pedicels that are covered in fine hairs. The pedicels are attached to 1.8-4 by 0.9-2 millimeter peduncles that are covered in fine hairs. It has 3 triangular to oval, slightly hairy, sepals that are 0.8-1.9 by 2-5 millimeters. The tips of the sepals are pointed. Its flowers have 6 petals in two rows of three. The outer petals have a total length of 17.2-111.7 millimeters. The spoon-shaped basal portion is 3.5-5.8 by 4.7-8.1 millimeters with a slightly hairy upper side. The apical lance-shaped portion of the outer petal is 13-106.5 by 1.9-7.9 millimeters. The tip is tail-like and curved backwards in a hook shape. The inner petals have a total length of 7.2-13.4 millimeters. The basal portion is 3.7-9.3 by 3.5-7.4 millimeters and slightly hairy on its upper surface and edges. The apical portion is 1.2-5 by 1.2-2.9 millimeters, tapers to a point and is hairless on the underside. Its flowers have 187-244 stamen that are 1.2-2.3 millimeters long with anthers that are 0.9-1.8 by 0.2-0.5 millimeters. The tissue connecting the lobes of the anthers extends upward for 0.1-0.5 millimeter and is hairless. Its flowers have 123-142 carpels that are 1.6-3.1 by 0.2-0.8 millimeters with 0.5-1.3 millimeters long styles that are straight or slightly curved. Each elliptical fruit is 18-99 by 7.8-22.2 millimeters with a blunt base and a 0.1 millimeter long tapered tip. The fruit are smooth and slightly hairy to hairy. Each fruit is attached to a 2.3-5.5 centimeter long pedicel, which in turn is attached to a 4.3 centimeter long peduncle. The fruit have elliptical seeds that are 6.3-17.3 by 3.2-12.5 millimeters.

=== Reproductive biology ===
The pollen of N. hamata is shed as permanent tetrads.

== Habitat and distribution ==
It has been observed growing in humid habitats, near rivers, on slopes, in high and secondary forests, at elevations from 90-700 meters.
