= Neostenanthera neurosericea =

Conservation status
- Data Deficient (IUCN 3.1)

Scientific classification
- Kingdom: Plantae
- Clade: Embryophytes
- Clade: Tracheophytes
- Clade: Angiosperms
- Clade: Magnoliids
- Order: Magnoliales
- Family: Annonaceae
- Genus: Neostenanthera
- Species: N. neurosericea

Binomial name
- Neostenanthera neurosericea (Diels) Exell (1935)

Synonyms
- Boutiquea platypetala (Engl. & Diels) Le Thomas (1965); Neostenanthera macrantha (Mildbr. & Diels) Exell (1935); Neostenanthera platypetala (Engl. & Diels) Pellegr. (1950); Stenanthera macrantha Mildbr. & Diels (1915); Stenanthera neurosericea Diels (1907); Stenanthera platypetala Engl. & Diels (1907)

Genus of flowering plants

Neostenanthera neurosericea is a species of flowering plant in the family Annonaceae. It is a shrub or tree native to southwestern Cameroon and Gabon.

This plant is known to science by only 14 specimens collected from eight locations. It is a shrub or tree generally growing 3 to 5 metres (10 to 16 ft) tall, sometimes reaching 10 metres (33 ft). It has showy flowers and fruits. Its pollen is shed as permanent tetrads. It grows in evergreen forest habitat.

This is a vulnerable species threatened by habitat loss as forest is cleared for agriculture.
