= Neostenanthera =

Scientific classification
- Kingdom: Plantae
- Clade: Embryophytes
- Clade: Tracheophytes
- Clade: Spermatophytes
- Clade: Angiosperms
- Clade: Magnoliids
- Order: Magnoliales
- Family: Annonaceae
- Genus: Neostenanthera; Exell

Synonyms
- Stenanthera (Oliv.) Engl. & Diels; Boutiquea Le Thomas

Genus of flowering plants

Neostenanthera is a genus of flowering plant in the Annonaceae family. All discovered species are native to western and central tropical Africa.

Five species are accepted.

- Neostenanthera gabonensis (Engl. & Diels) Exell
- Neostenanthera hamata (Benth.) Exell
- Neostenanthera myristicifolia (Oliv.) Exell
- Neostenanthera neurosericea (Diels) Exell
- Neostenanthera robsonii Le Thomas
