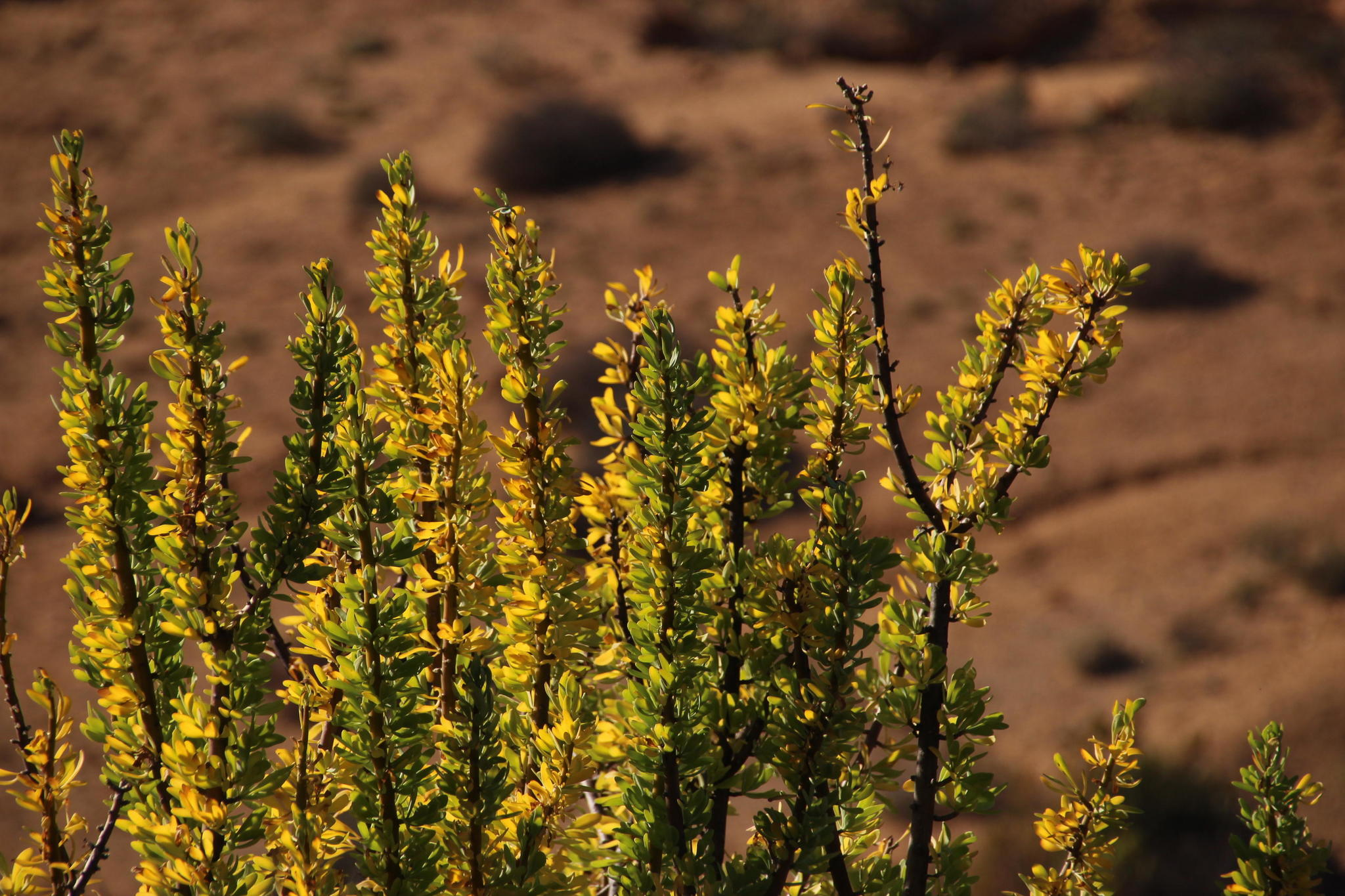

Scientific classification
- Kingdom: Plantae
- Clade: Tracheophytes
- Clade: Angiosperms
- Clade: Eudicots
- Clade: Asterids
- Order: Asterales
- Family: Asteraceae
- Genus: Othonna
- Species: O. cerarioides

Binomial name
- Othonna cerarioides Magoswana & J.C. Manning

Synonyms
- Othonna koos-bekkeri van Jaarsv.

= Othonna cerarioides =

Shrub endemic to Namaqualand

Othonna cerarioides is a species of flowering plant in the family Asteraceae. It is found in Namaqualand, Northern Cape, South Africa.

== Description ==
This species is described as an erect fleshy shrub 1–2 m tall. It has rod‐like stems and branches with waxy bark and large numbers of 20–100mm spur-like shoots. Its leaves are obovate-oblanceolate in shape and 5–40 × 3–15 mm. Leaves are clustered at the tips of the spur-shoots, but when flowering, the plant is leafless. It bears yellow flowers from April to August. The species is unique in the genus for its large size and unusual growth habit.

== Taxonomy ==
It was described by Magoswana et al. in 2020 as a new species that had previously been called Othonna sp. A. The species epithet refers to the foliage and habit resembling plants in the genus Ceraria.

== Distribution ==
The species is commonly found on rocky granite slopes on and around boulders at elevations above 600m around Springbok and O’kiep in northern Namaqualand, Northern Cape. It may also be found in the Richtersveld.

== Gallery ==
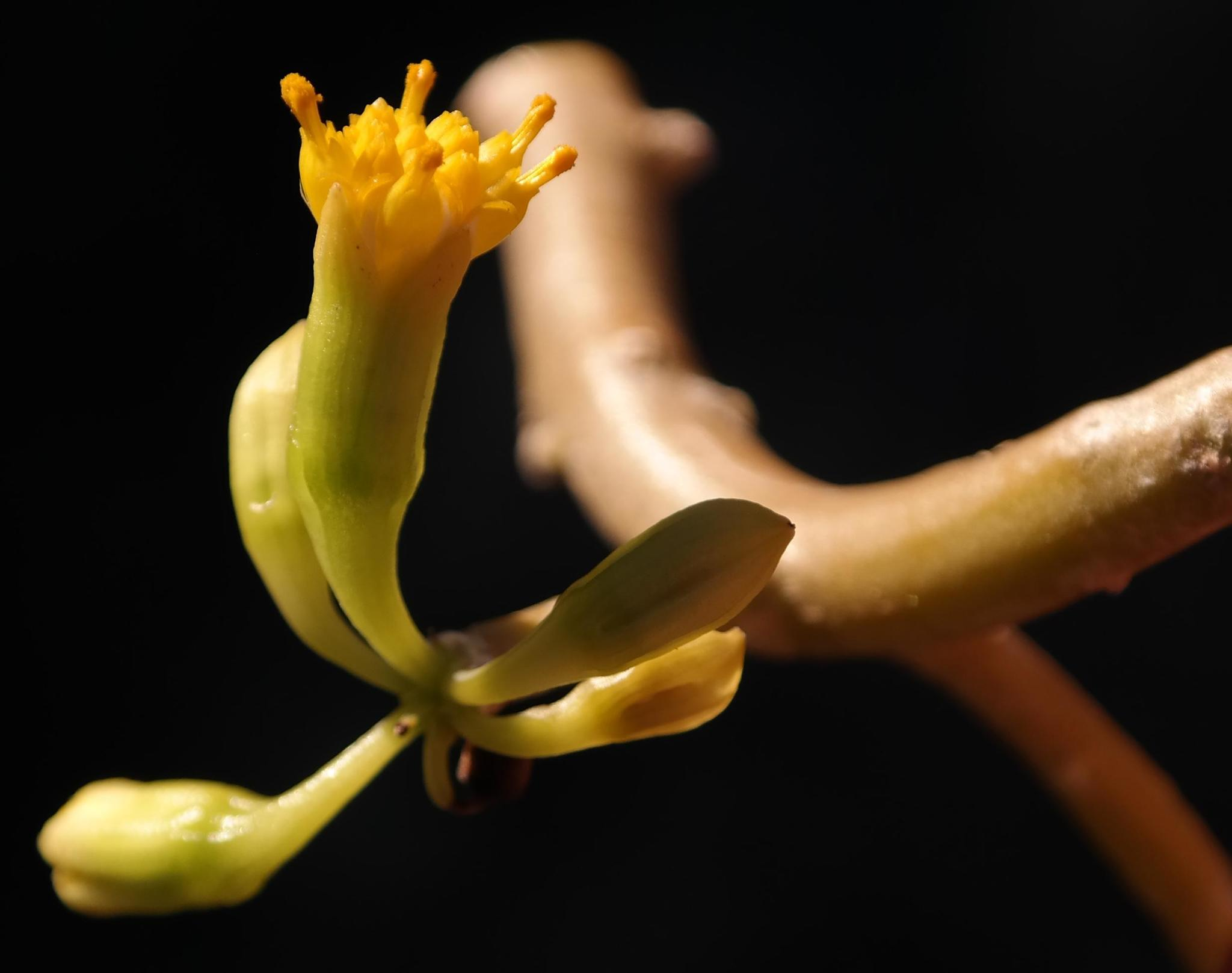
Close up of yellow flower

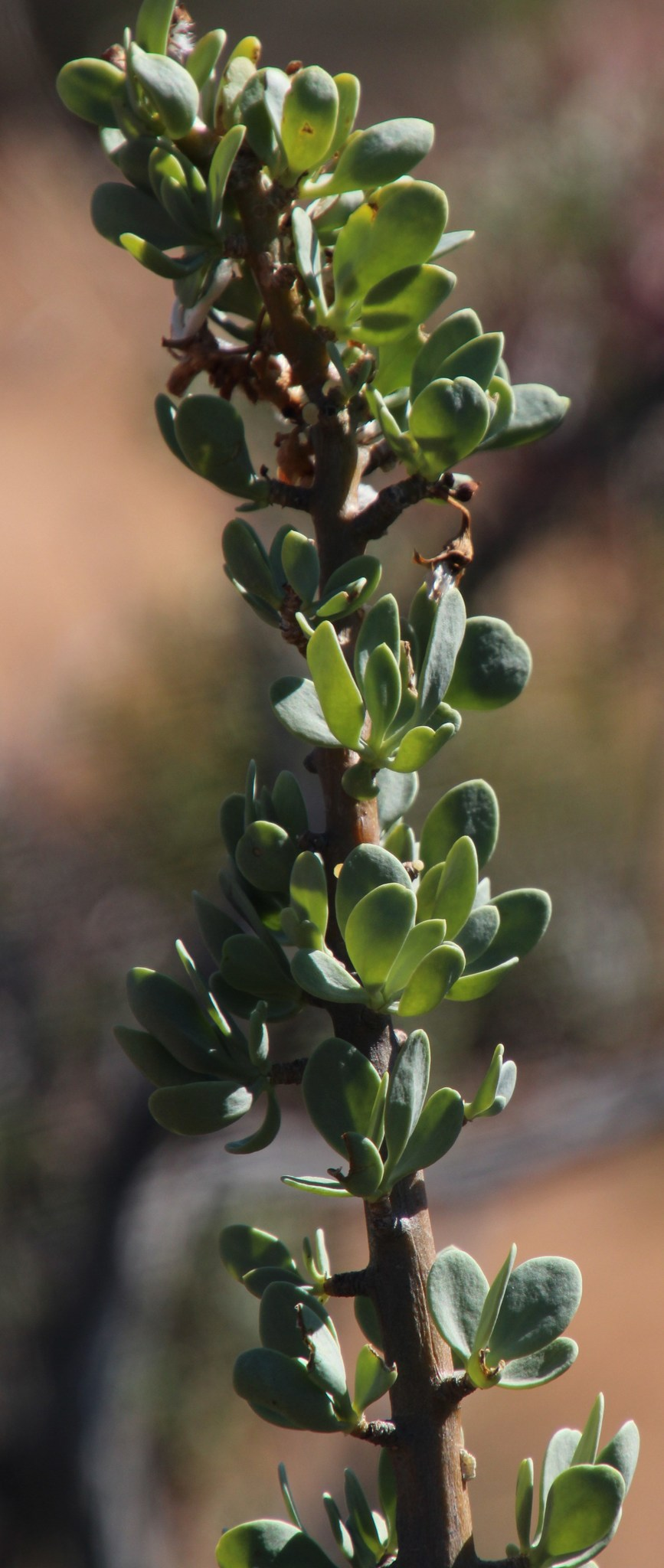
Close up of leaves
