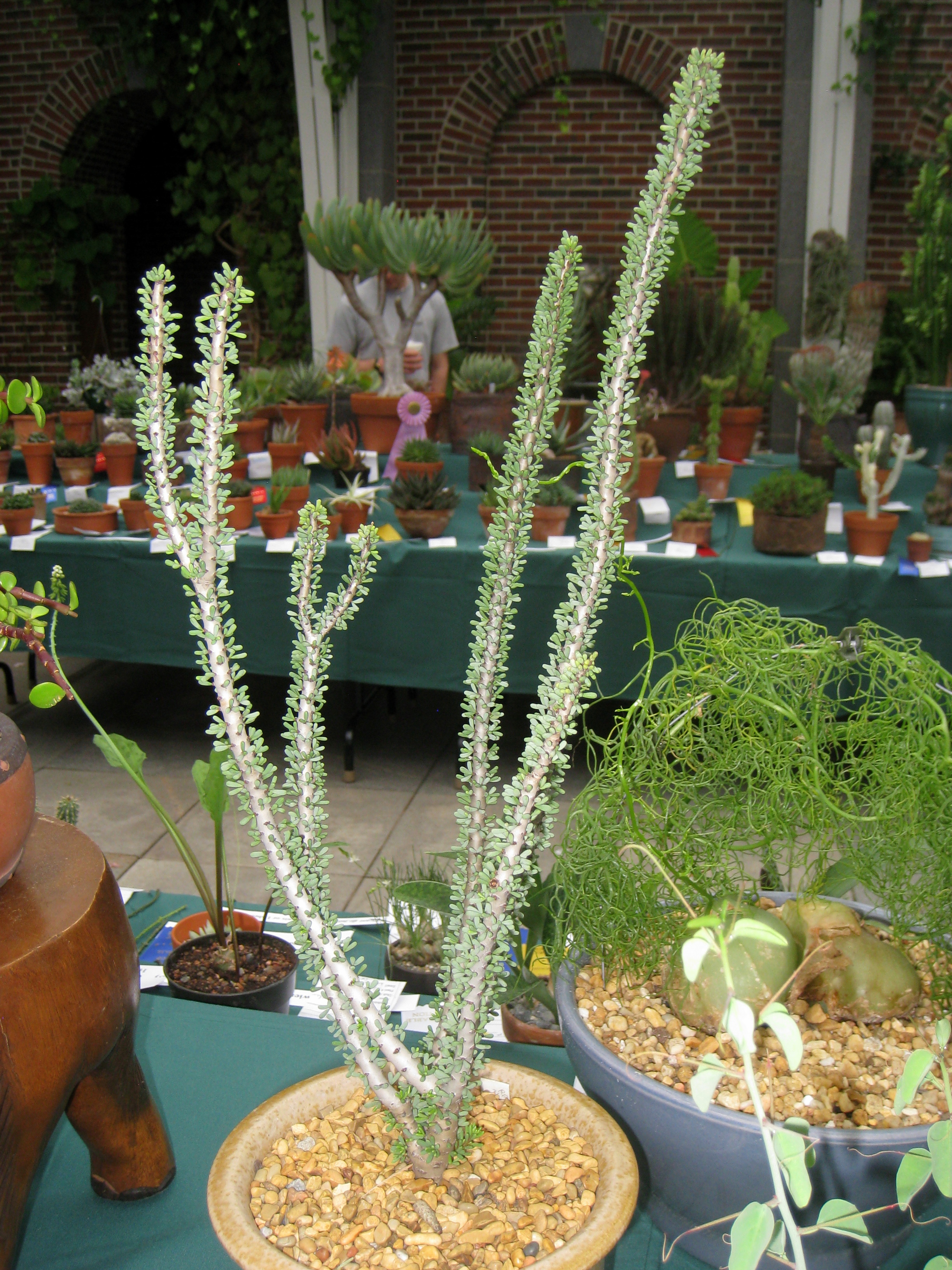
- Portulacaria namaquensis with Bowiea volubilis, Kumara plicatilis

Conservation status
- Least Concern (IUCN 3.1)

Scientific classification
- Kingdom: Plantae
- Clade: Tracheophytes
- Clade: Angiosperms
- Clade: Eudicots
- Order: Caryophyllales
- Family: Didiereaceae
- Genus: Portulacaria
- Species: P. namaquensis

Binomial name
- Portulacaria namaquensis Sond.

Synonyms
- Ceraria gariepina H.Pearson & Stephens; Ceraria namaquensis (Sond.) H.Pearson & Stephens

= Portulacaria namaquensis =

Species of succulent plant

Portulacaria namaquensis, synonym Ceraria namaquensis, with the common names Namaqua porkbush and Namaqua portulacaria, is a species of succulent shrub, native to the border between the Cape Provinces of South Africa and Namibia.

== Description ==
It reaches heights of 1.3 to 1.8 metres (4 ft 3 in to 5 ft 11 in), and typically has small, ovoid, club-shaped leaves. These succulent leaves are deciduous and densely coat its stems. The stems are stout and grow upwards, forking. They are very slow growing. Its flowers are usually unisexual.

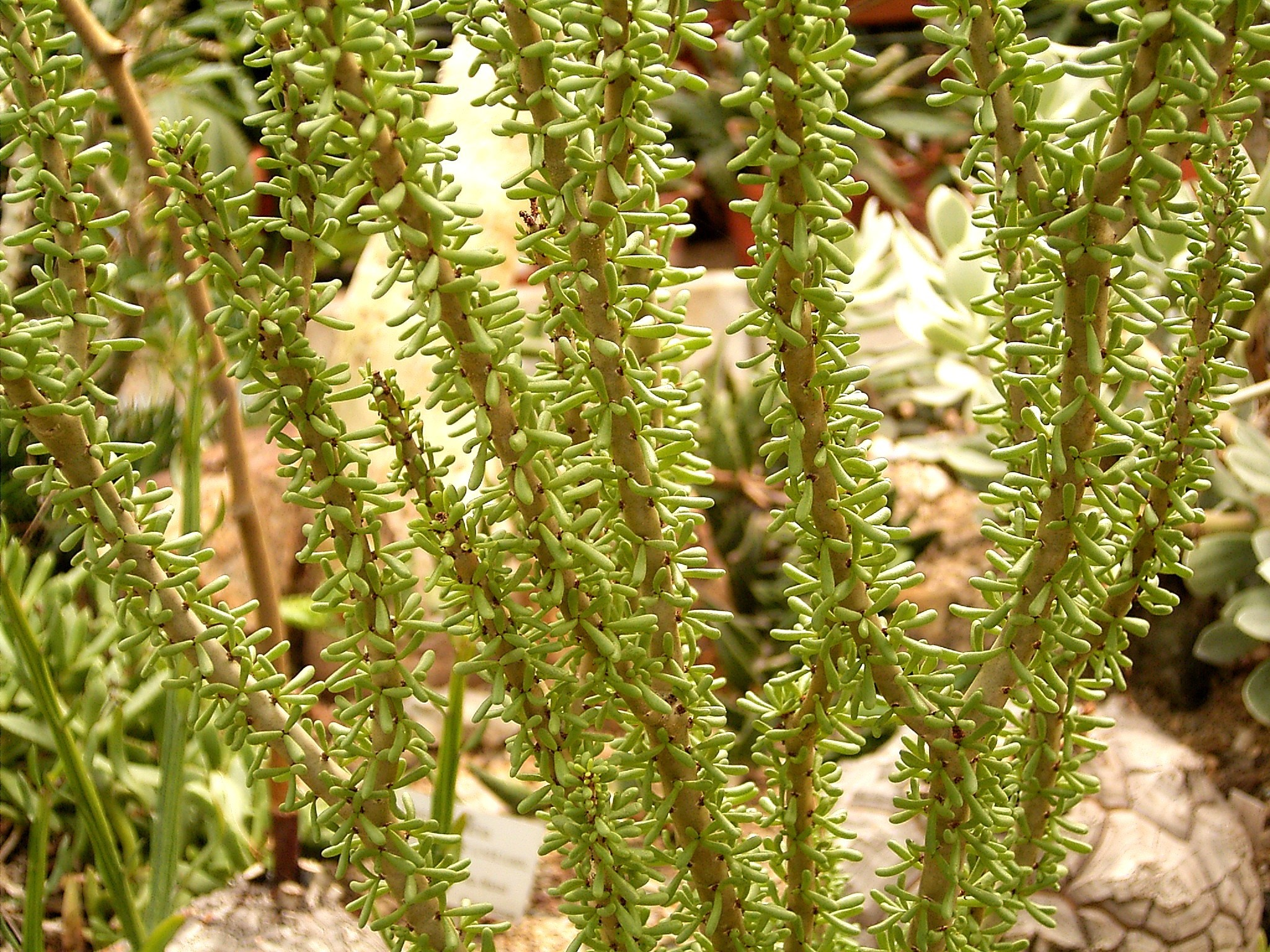
Detail of the distinctive leaves

== Taxonomy ==
The species was first described as Portulacaria namaquensis in 1862 by Otto Wilhelm Sonder. It was transferred to the genus Ceraria in 1912. A phylogenetic study in 2014 showed that Ceraria was nested within Portulacaria, so the accepted name as of March 2024 is Portulacaria namaquensis.

Its closest relative is the species Portulacaria armiana.

== Distribution ==
The natural habitat of this species extends along the Orange River valley, along the border between Namibia and South Africa. It has also been recorded near the coast slightly further north in Namibia.

== Cultivation ==
Its native habitat is an extremely arid, winter-rainfall area. In cultivation, it requires extremely well-drained soil, and is usually grown grafted onto a root-stock of the more resilient Portulacaria afra.
