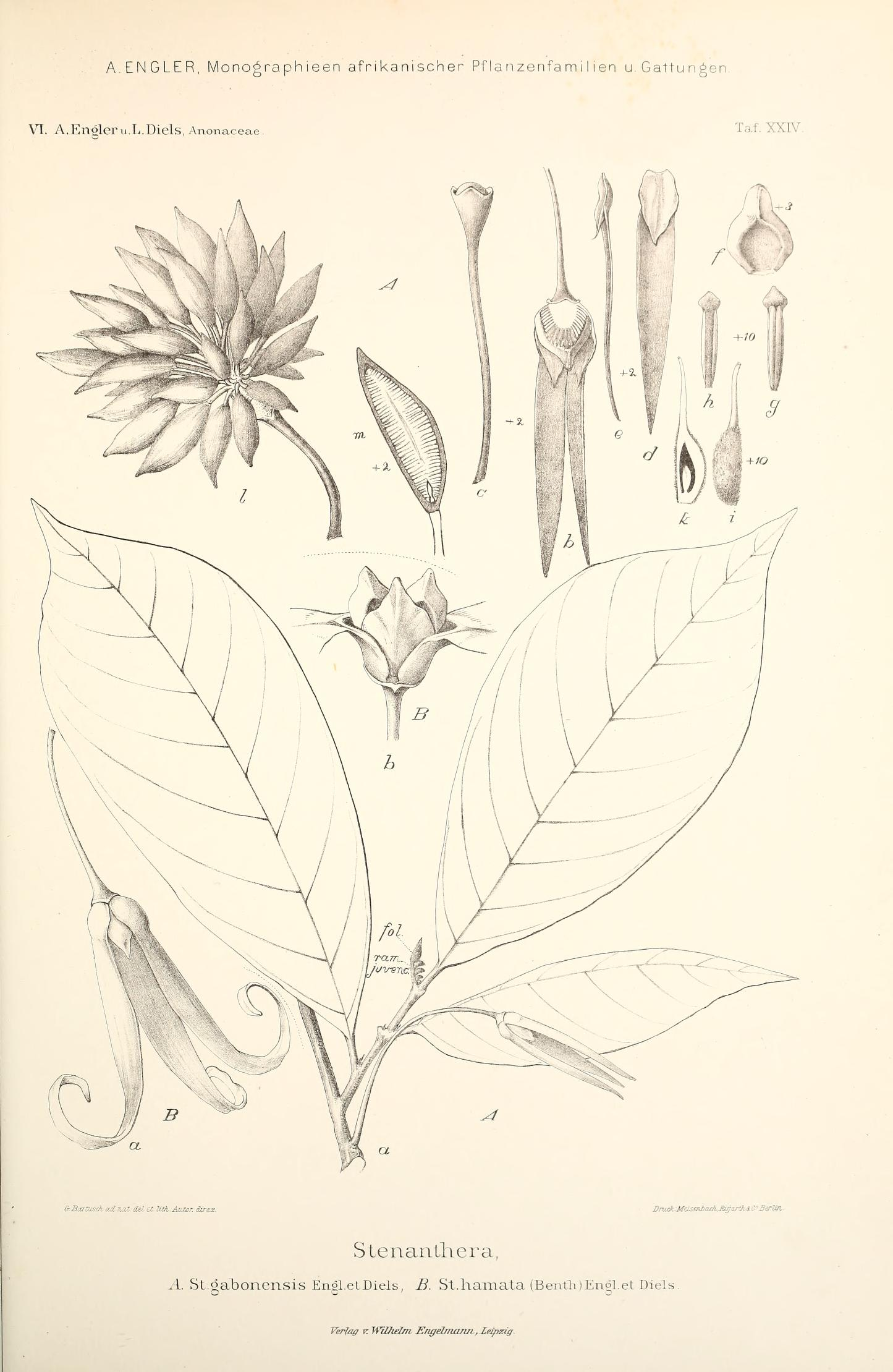

Conservation status
- Least Concern (IUCN 3.1)

Scientific classification
- Kingdom: Plantae
- Clade: Tracheophytes
- Clade: Angiosperms
- Clade: Magnoliids
- Order: Magnoliales
- Family: Annonaceae
- Genus: Neostenanthera
- Species: N. gabonensis

Binomial name
- Neostenanthera gabonensis (Engl. & Diels) Exell

Synonyms
- Neostenanthera bakuana (A.Chev. ex Hutch. & Dalziel) Exell; Oxymitra gabonensis Engl. & Diels; Stenanthera gabonensis (Engl. & Diels) Engl. & Diels

= Neostenanthera gabonensis =

Species of plant in the soursop family

Neostenanthera gabonensis is a species of plant in the family Annonaceae. It is native to Cabinda Province, Cameroon, Equatorial Guinea, Gabon, Ghana, Ivory Coast, Liberia, and The Republic of the Congo. Heinrich Gustav Adolf Engler and Ludwig Diels, the German botanists who first formally described the species, using the basionym Oxymitra gabonensis, named it after Gabon where the specimen they examined was found near a site they identified as Sibange-Farm.

== Description ==
It is a shrub or small tree reaching 6 meters (20 ft) in height. Its oblong to lance-shaped leaves are 5.2-20.9 by 2.3-7.1 centimeters. The tips of the leaves taper to a point, and their bases are wedge-shaped to rounded. The upper surface of the leaves are green and hairless to slightly hairy, their lower surface is green to greyish, waxy blue and slightly hairy. The leaves have 8-17 pairs of secondary veins emanating from their midribs. Its slightly hairy petioles are 2.6-12.9 by 0.7-1.7 millimeters. It usually has solitary flowers that are born on 31.3-71.7 millimeter, slightly hairy pedicels. The pedicels are attached to 1-3.7 by 1.7 millimeter peduncles. It has 3 triangular to oval, slightly hairy, sepals are 0.5-1.8 by 0.7-1.7 millimeters. The tips of the sepals are pointed, or taper to a point. Its flowers have 6 petals in two rows of three. The outer petals have a total length of 7.1-46.5 millimeters long. The spoon-shaped basal portion is 3-7 by 3.5-5.3 millimeters with a hairless upper side and slightly hairy underside. The apical lance-shaped portion of the outer petal is 4.1-40.6 by 1-5.9 millimeters and covered in white shaggy hairs, particularly near the edges on the upper side. The inner petals have a total length of 3.1-9.8 millimeters and densely covered in fine hairs on its upper surface. The basal portion is 2.6-6.9 by 3.7-5.4. The apical portion is 0.5-4.5 by 1.2-3.4 with an expended tip that is curved inward. Its flowers have 75–103 stamen that are 1.8-2.9 millimeters long. the tissue connecting the lobes of the anthers extends upward for 0.5-1.5 millimeter and is slightly hairy. Its flowers have 23–38 carpels that are 2.1-3.5 by 0.2-0.6 millimeters with 0.5-1.5 millimeters long styles that that have a knee-like bend. Each spindle-shaped fruit is 6-26.2 by 5.6-11.8 millimeters with a pointed base and a 0.5-4.1 millimeter long tapered tip. The fruit are ribbed and slightly hairy. Each fruit is attached to a 2.9-6.1 centimeter long pedicel, which in turn is attached to a 1.5-1.9 centimeter long peduncle. The fruit have spindle-shaped seeds that are 13.4-22.2 by 4.7-6.9 millimeters.

=== Reproductive biology ===
The pollen of N. gabonensis is shed as permanent tetrads.

== Habitat and distribution ==
It has been observed growing near rivers, in swampy areas, in the undergrowth of primary and secondary forests, at elevations from 15 to 620 meters (49 to 2,000 ft).
