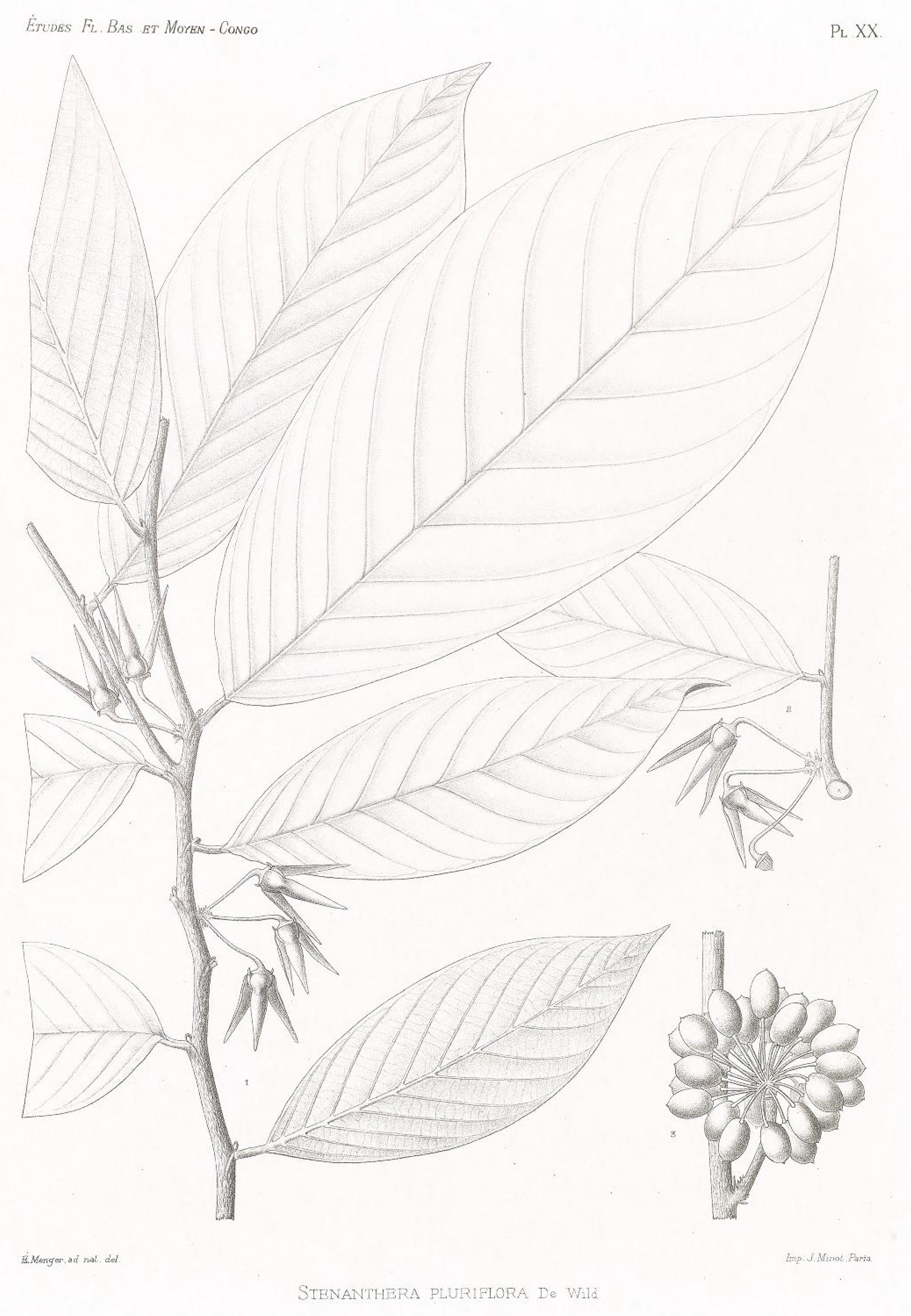
- Black and white botanical illustration of Neostenanthera myristicifolia (using the synonym Stenanthera pluriflora)

Conservation status
- Least Concern (IUCN 3.1)

Scientific classification
- Kingdom: Plantae
- Clade: Embryophytes
- Clade: Tracheophytes
- Clade: Spermatophytes
- Clade: Angiosperms
- Clade: Magnoliids
- Order: Magnoliales
- Family: Annonaceae
- Genus: Neostenanthera
- Species: N. myristicifolia

Binomial name
- Neostenanthera myristicifolia (Oliv.) Exell

Synonyms
- Neostenanthera pluriflora (De Wild.) Exell; Oxymitra myristicifolia Oliv.; Stenanthera pluriflora De Wild.

= Neostenanthera myristicifolia =

Species of plant in the soursop family

Neostenanthera myristicifolia is a species of plant in the family Annonaceae. It is native to Benin, Cameroon, The Central African Republic, The Democratic Republic of the Congo, Equatorial Guinea, Gabon, Nigeria, and The Republic of the Congo.

== Description ==
It is a shrub or tree reaching 13 meters (43 ft) in height. Its elliptical to oblong leaves are 8.5-25.5 by 3.7-9 centimeters. The tips of the leaves taper to a point, and their bases are blunt to rounded. The upper surface of the leaves are green to brown and hairless to slightly hairy, their lower surface is dark yellow-green to waxy blue and slightly hairy. The leaves have 10–18 pairs of secondary veins emanating from their midribs. Its petioles are 4-12.4 by 0.7-2.5 millimeters and slightly hairy. Its flowers occur in groups of 2–4 that are positioned on the stem, often opposite from leaves. The flowers are born on 12.2-38 millimeter long pedicels that are slightly hairy. The pedicels are attached to 1.1-5 by 1.2-3.6 millimeter peduncles that are slightly hairy. It has 3 triangular to oval, slightly hairy, sepals that are 0.8-4.2 by 1.2-2.6 millimeters. The tips of the sepals are pointed or taper to a point. Its flowers have 6 petals in two rows of three. The outer petals have a total length of 6.5-29 millimeters. The spoon-shaped basal portion is 1.4-4.9 by 2.5-5.9 millimeters with a slightly hairy upper side. The apical lance-shaped portion of the outer petal is 5-25.2 by 1–9.2 millimeters with a tapering tip. The inner petals have a total length of 3.4-10.9 millimeters. The basal portion is 1.6-6.1 by 16-5.6 millimeters and slightly hairy on its upper surface. The apical portion is 1.8-5.7 by 0.6-3 millimeters, pointed at the tip, and hairless on the upper surface. Its flowers have 135-156 stamen that are 0.9-2.8 millimeters long with anthers that are 0.7-2.4 by 0.2-0.6 millimeters. The tissue connecting the lobes of the anthers extends upward for 0.1-0.5 millimeter and is hairless. Its flowers have 67–109 carpels that are 0.8-2.8 by 0.1-0.5 millimeters with 0.2-1.4 millimeters long styles that are straight or slightly curved. Each elliptical fruit is 4.4-60 by 2–9.6 millimeters with a blunt base and a 0.4-1.1 millimeter long tapered tip. The fruit are smooth and covered in fine hairs or hairless at maturity. Each fruit is attached to a 1.9-3.9 centimeter long pedicel, which in turn is attached to a 1.1-5.1 centimeter long peduncle. The fruit have elliptical seeds that are 3.5-13.1 by 1.7-9.2 millimeters.

=== Reproductive biology ===
The pollen of N. gabonensis is shed as permanent tetrads.

== Habitat and distribution ==
It has been observed growing in swampy habitats; near rivers; in primary, secondary or gallery forests, at elevations from 300 to 1,000 meters (980 to 3,280 ft).
