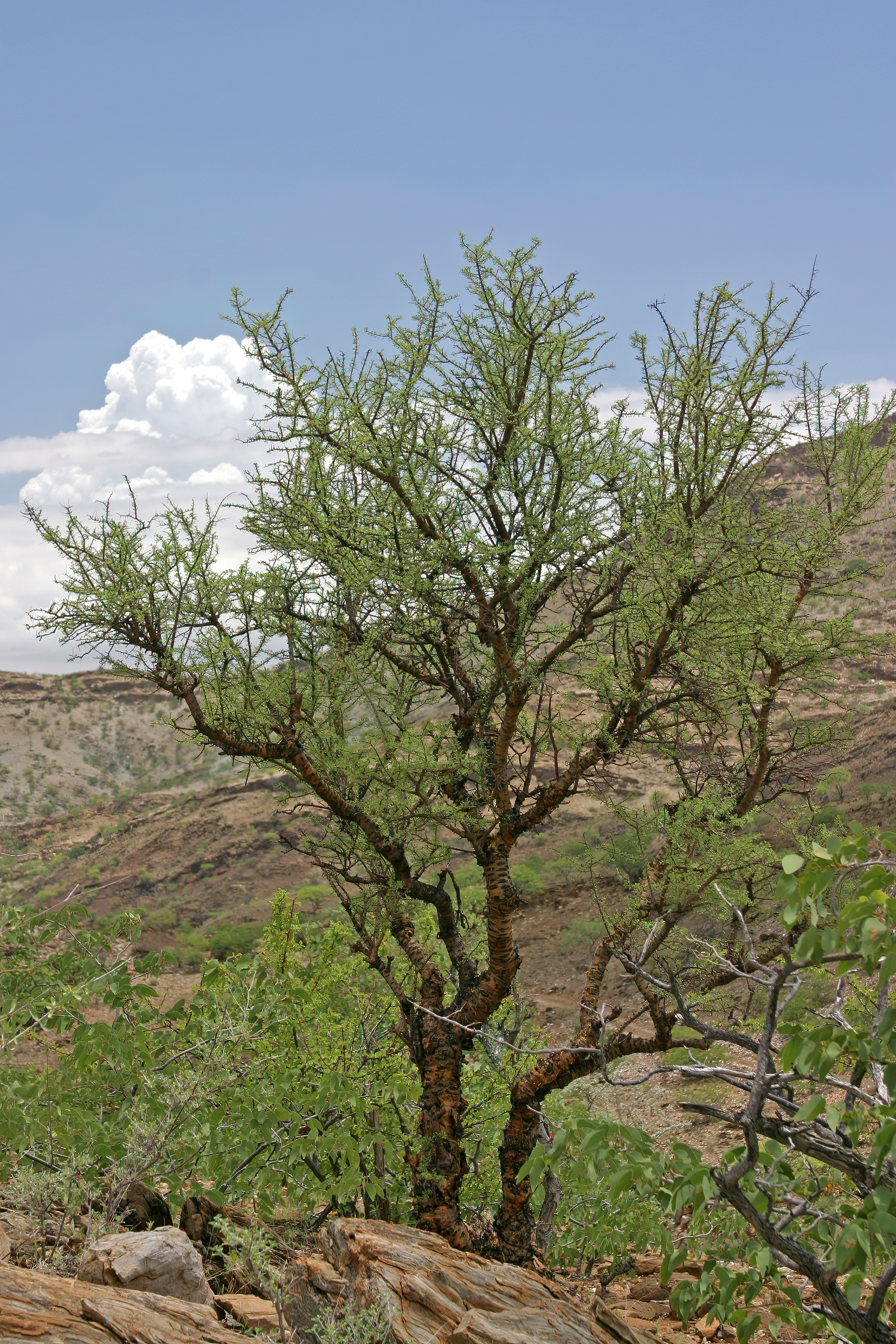
- Portulacaria longipedunculata

Scientific classification
- Kingdom: Plantae
- Clade: Tracheophytes
- Clade: Angiosperms
- Clade: Eudicots
- Order: Caryophyllales
- Family: Didiereaceae
- Genus: Portulacaria
- Species: P. longipedunculata

Binomial name
- Portulacaria longipedunculata Merxm & Podlech

= Portulacaria longipedunculata =

Species of succulent plant

Portulacaria longipedunculata (previously Ceraria longipedunculata or Ceraria kaokoensis) is a small-leaved succulent plant found in the far north of Namibia and into southern Angola.

== Description ==
It is a soft-wooded, deciduous shrub with long, thin, succulent leaves and bisexual flowers.
