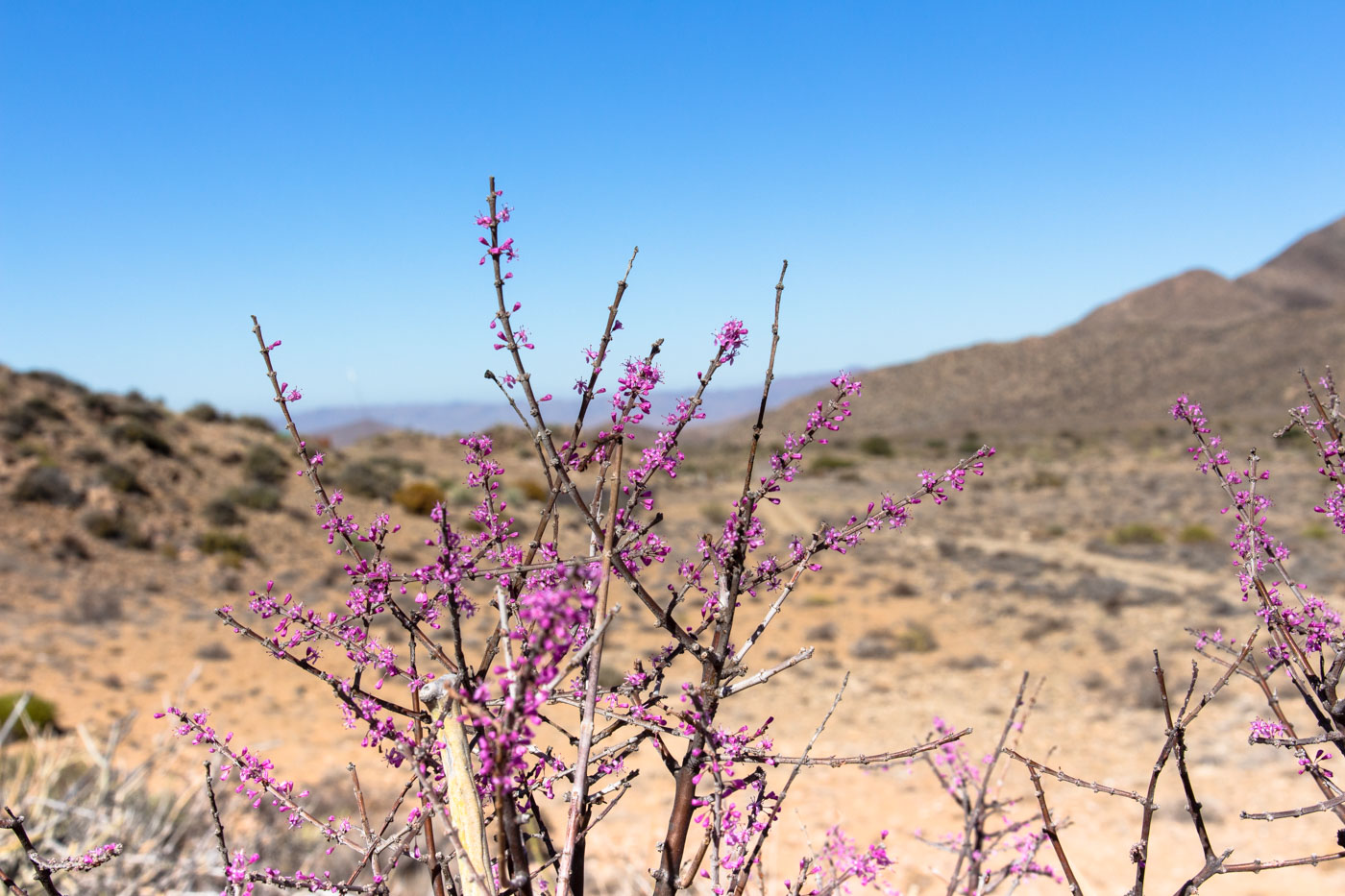

Scientific classification
- Kingdom: Plantae
- Clade: Tracheophytes
- Clade: Angiosperms
- Clade: Eudicots
- Order: Caryophyllales
- Family: Didiereaceae
- Genus: Portulacaria
- Species: P. fruticulosa

Binomial name
- Portulacaria fruticulosa Pearson & Stephens

= Portulacaria fruticulosa =

Species of succulent plant

Portulacaria fruticulosa (previously Ceraria fruticulosa or Ceraria schaeferi) is a succulent plant found in southwestern Namibia and the northwestern Cape Provinces of South Africa.

== Description ==
It is a soft-wooded deciduous shrub with flat, round succulent leaves. It bears unisexual flowers on sessile inflorescences.

Within the genus Portulacaria, it is most closely related to its tiny sister-species, Portulacaria pygmaea.
