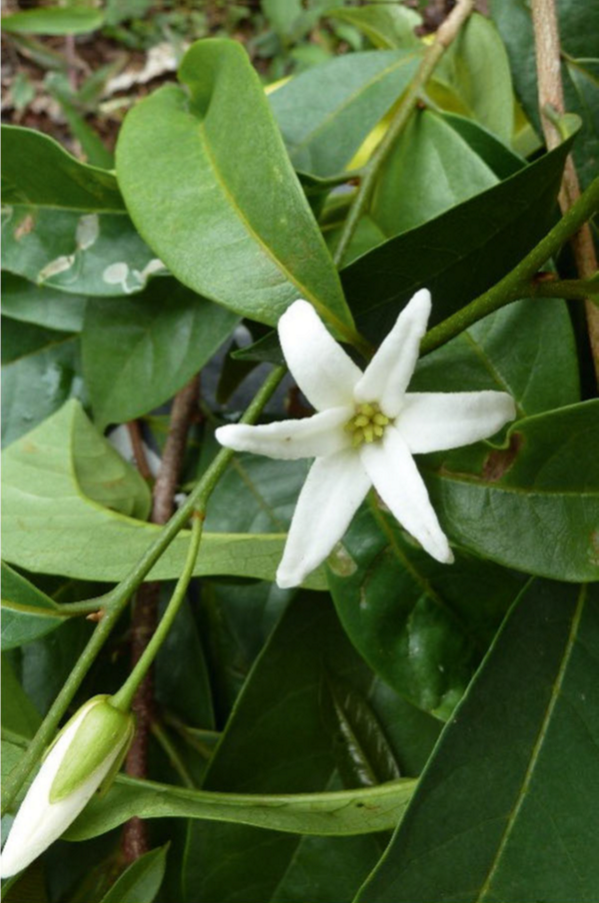
- Photograph of Mischogyne elliotiana

Conservation status
- Least Concern (IUCN 3.1)

Scientific classification
- Kingdom: Plantae
- Clade: Embryophytes
- Clade: Tracheophytes
- Clade: Spermatophytes
- Clade: Angiosperms
- Clade: Magnoliids
- Order: Magnoliales
- Family: Annonaceae
- Genus: Mischogyne
- Species: M. elliotiana

Binomial name
- Mischogyne elliotiana (Engl. & Diels) R.E.Fr. ex Le Thomas

Synonyms
- Uvaria elliotiana Engl. & Diels; Uvariastrum elliotianum (Engl. & Diels) Sprague & Hutch. Uvariopsis chevalieri Robyns & Ghesq.

= Mischogyne elliotiana =

Species of plant

Mischogyne elliotiana is a species of plant in the Annonaceae family. It is native to Cameroon, Gabon, Ghana, Guinea-Bissau, Ivory Coast, Liberia, Nigeria, Sierra Leone, and Zaire. Adolf Engler and Ludwig Diels, the German botanists who first formally described the species using the basionym Uvaria elliotiana, named it after George Scott-Elliot the botanist who collected the specimen they examined.

== Description ==
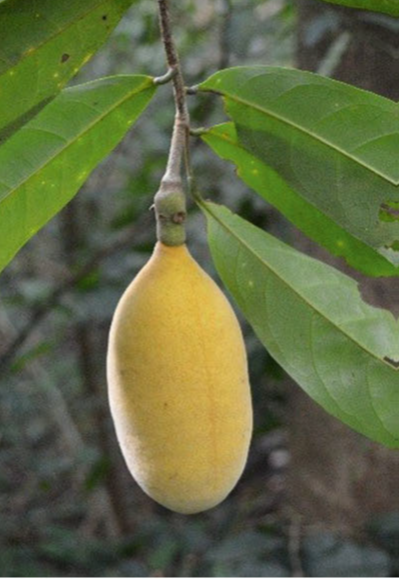
Photograph of Mischogyne elliotiana fruit

It is a bush reaching 4-7 meters in height. Its elliptical leaves are 8-17 by 4-8 centimeters. Its hairless leaves are wedge shaped at their point of attachment and come to a long tapering point at their tips. The leaves have a papery to leathery texture and are glossy green on their upper side and lighter on their underside. The leaves have 7-13 pairs of secondary veins emanating from either side of their midribs. Its hairless petioles are 5-7 millimeters long. Its flowers are solitary or in groups of 2-4. The flowers are on 0.7-1.5 centimeter pedicels that are covered in fine hairs and occur in axillary positions. The pedicels are subtended by a small bract. Its oblong sepals are 10 by 3.5-4 millimeters, covered in fine hairs on both sides, and come to a shallow point at their tips. Its flowers have 6 white petals arranged in two rows of three. The outer, oblong petals are 15 by 3-4 millimeters, and covered in woolly hairs on both sides. The inner petals are slightly shorter. Its flowers have cylindrical receptacles that are 3-4 millimeters long. Its flowers have numerous oblong stamens that are 2-2.5 millimeters long. The tissue that connects the theca is hairy an terminates in a tuft of hairs at the top of the anthers. Its flowers have 4-5 oblong, carpels that are 5-7 millimeters long and covered in hairs. Its stigmas are bilobed. The carpels contain numerous ovules in two rows. Its are green to yellow with white spots, 6-10 by 4-6 centimeters, and have a contour that is constricted around the seeds. Its fruit have 6-12 seeds that are 2-2.8 by 1.2-1.5 by 0.3-0.5 centimeters, arranged in 1 or two rows. The seeds are flat on one side, semi-circular on the opposite side, and covered in a white membrane.

=== Reproductive biology ===
The pollen of M. elliotiana is shed as permanent tetrads.

=== Habitat and distribution ===
It has been observed growing in evergreen or semideciduous forests that receive 100-400 centimeters of rain per year.

=== Uses ===
Gosline and colleagues report the white flesh of the fruits as being edible.
