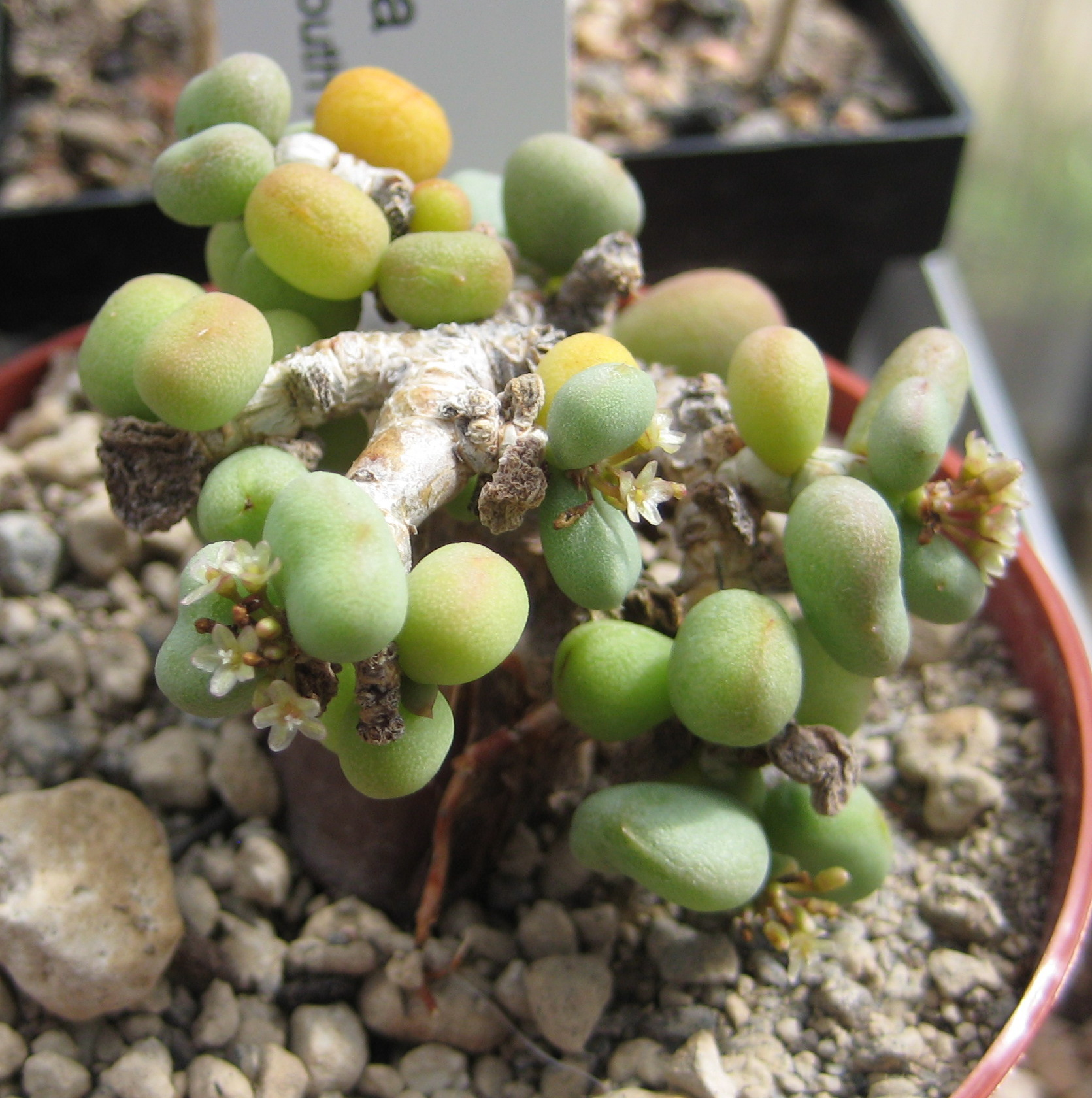

Scientific classification
- Kingdom: Plantae
- Clade: Tracheophytes
- Clade: Angiosperms
- Clade: Eudicots
- Order: Caryophyllales
- Family: Didiereaceae
- Genus: Portulacaria
- Species: P. pygmaea

Binomial name
- Portulacaria pygmaea Pillans

= Portulacaria pygmaea =

Species of succulent plant

Portulacaria pygmaea (previously Ceraria pygmaea), also known as the pygmy porkbush, is a small-leaved dwarf succulent plant found on the border between Namibia and the Cape Provinces of South Africa.

== Description ==
It is a small, compact, soft-wooded, dwarf shrub with Unisexual flowers (dioecious). Its blue-green leaves are semi-evergreen. Its tiny compact branches spread, and often droop, staying close to the ground. It also develops a thick caudex or root-stock, which has led to it being a popular bonsai specimen.

Within the genus Portulacaria it is most closely related to its larger sister-species Portulacaria fruticulosa.
