= John Gossweiler =

Angola state botanist (1873–1952)

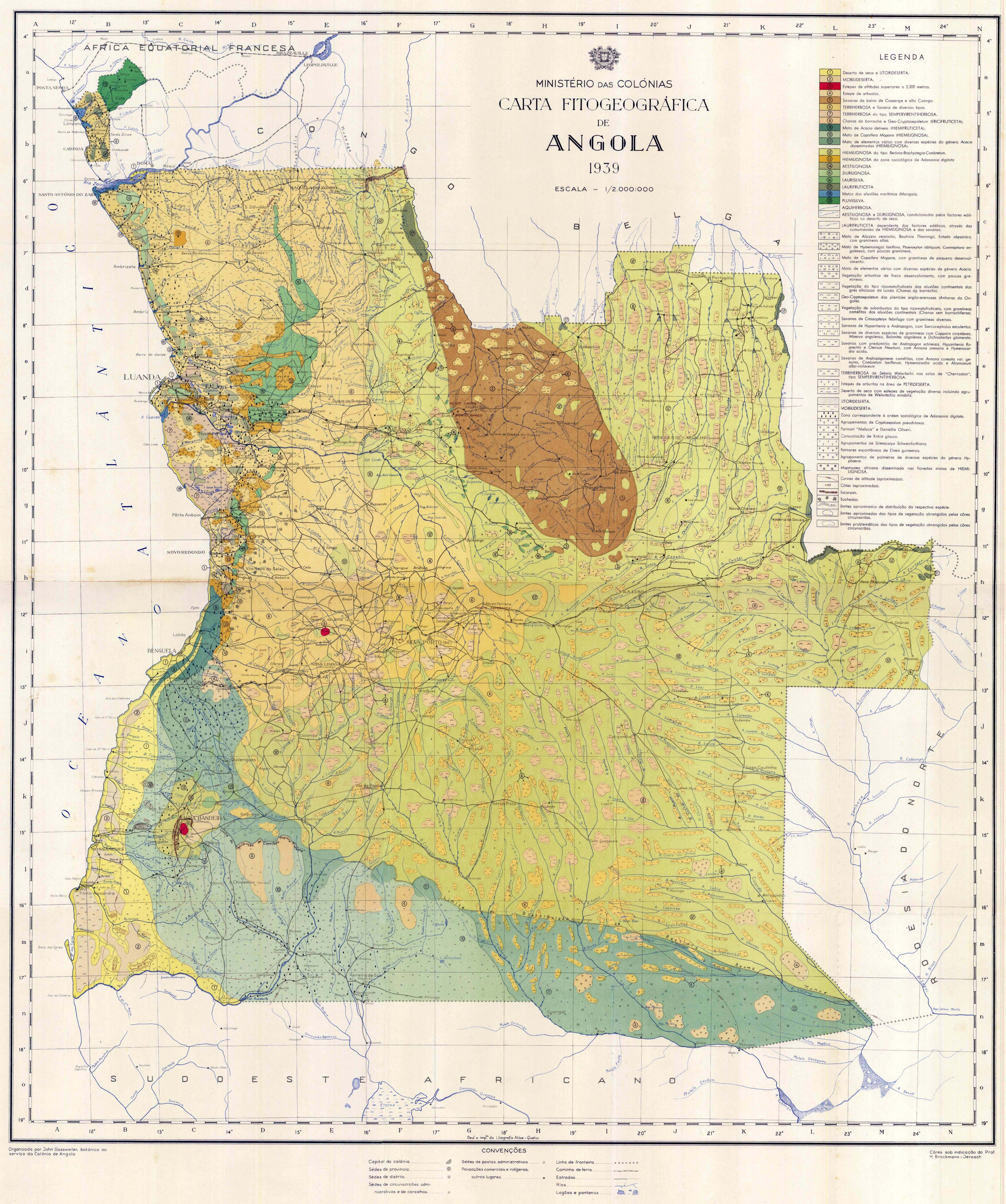
John Gossweiler's 1939 phytogeographic map of Angola

Johannes Gossweiler ComIC (24 December 1873, in Regensdorf – 19 February 1952, in Lisbon) aka John Gossweiler or João Gossweiler, was state botanist to the Government of Angola from 1899 until his death. He made important collections in every district of Angola and created the first phytogeographic map of that country. His collections of African plant specimens were sent regularly to Lisbon (Jardim Colonial and Jardim Botânico da Universidade), the British Museum, the Royal Botanic Gardens, Kew, and the University of Coimbra. Duplicates were also kept at the Herbarium of the Instituto de Investigação Agronómica in Angola. Today, many herbaria contain specimens he collected (see #Collections in herbaria).

== Biography ==
Gossweiler studied horticulture in Zurich, Stuttgart and Dresden, later spending four years in London at the Royal College of Science in South Kensington, and 1897-98 at the Royal Botanic Gardens, Kew. He was inspired by William Turner Thiselton-Dyer while at Kew, and went on to work for the government of Angola in the country's botanical garden in Luanda, where he remained until his death in 1952.

Arriving in Angola, Gossweiler found the garden far from complete, and started collecting in the coastal area around Luanda and the Malanje Plateau. In 1905 he studied the indigenous plant sources of rubber of the Cuando-Cubango and Bié Plateau regions and collected many novel plants along the Okavango River.

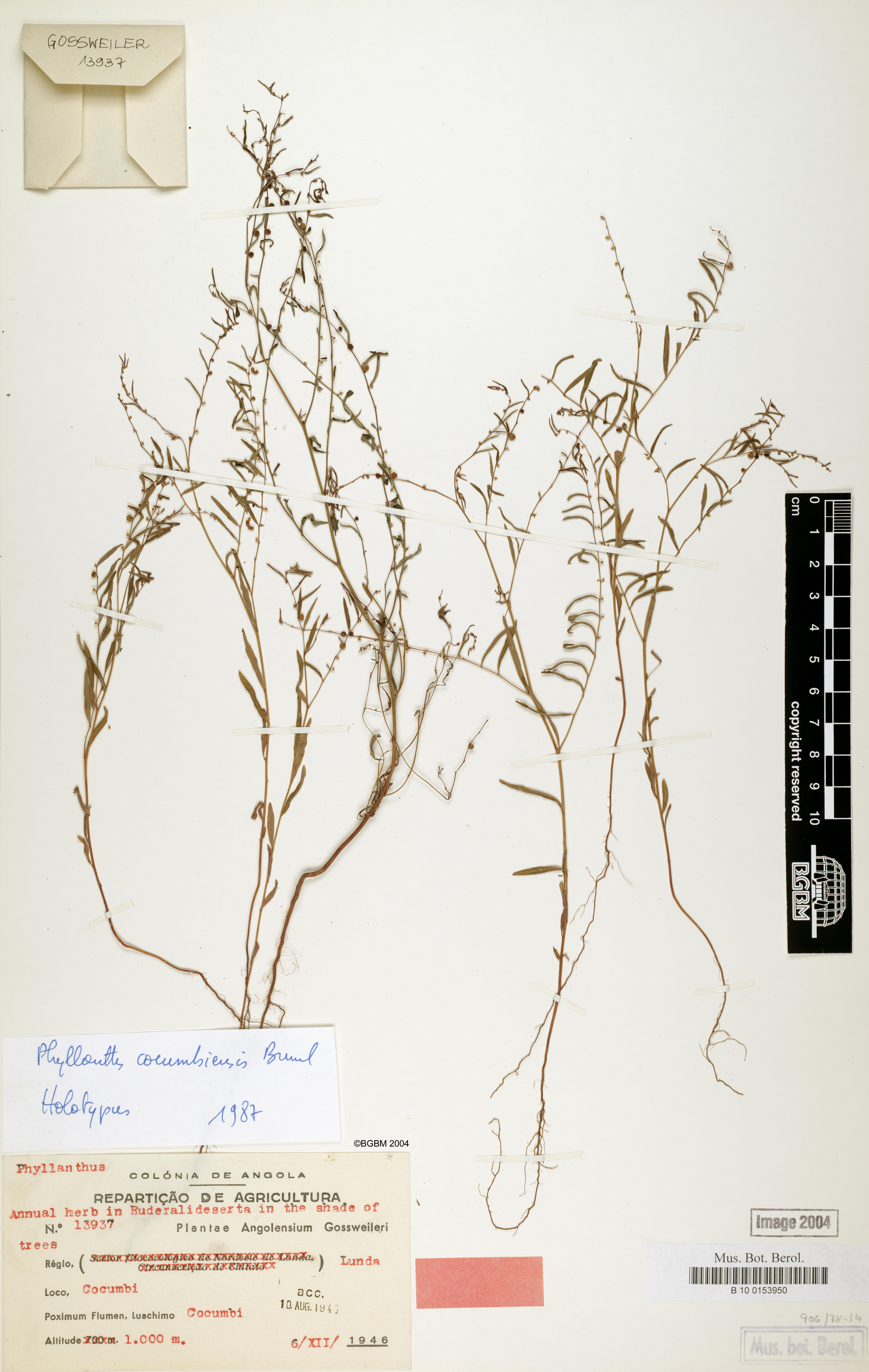
Phyllanthus cocumbiensis, Jean F. Brunel. Holotype at Herbarium Berolinense. Collected by John Gossweiler, 6 December 1946 at Cocumbi, Luanda, Angola. Leg.: J. Gossweiler 13937 (BD)

The 'Cazengo Colonial Garden', the botanical garden of which Gossweiler would be director, was finally ready by 1907. Located on the site of an abandoned plantation, Gossweiler stocked it with indigenous species and plants from Sri Lanka, Goa, Malaysia and Tropical America. His collection of pressed specimens steadily grew. In 1915/16 he worked in Subliali, Pango Munga, the rainforest region of Mayombe, and near the source of the Zanza River, where he was accompanied by his wife Martha.

Following World War I Gossweiler worked for the 'Fomento Geral de Angola' from 1919 to 1926, during which time he made substantial collections along the southern bank of the Congo River, in the Dembos region and at Quiçama. In 1927 Gossweiler rejoined the government service and worked at starting an experimental cotton station in Catete, travelling to Amboim in 1932 to investigate coffee plant diseases. His collections grew with plants from the mist forest south of Cazengo. He then spent some time in Portugal at the University of Coimbra and the Colonial Garden in Lisbon, working on his collections.

Gossweiler embarked on two more collecting expeditions in Angola. In 1937-8 he joined a pair of Portuguese botanists, Luis Carrisso and F.A. Mendonça of Coimbra University, and Arthur Wallis Exell of the British Museum, on an extensive expedition covering some 13,000 km. On this expedition Carrisso suffered a fatal heart attack. Despite his death, work carried on, the results adding considerably to the 'Conspectus Florae Angolensis' of which the first volume, consisting of 55 parts, was published between 1937 and 1951. The other expedition was in 1947 when he collected in the forests of Dundo in the far north-east of Angola.

Gossweiler's collections amounted to some 14,000 specimens, and are housed at some of the world's important herbaria. "J. Gossweiler 14685 (BM)", a specimen of Anticharis aschersoniana, may be the last he collected (July 1950) that is preserved.

In 1936 Gossweiler's services were recognised by the Portuguese government, which awarded him the 'Comenda da Ordem do Imperio Colonial'. In 1950 he was elected a Foreign Member of the Linnean Society of London for his contributions to systematic botany.

Gossweiler died 1952 in Lisbon. In 1960, the Portuguese government granted his widow Marthe Gossweiler a life pension in recognition of his service to the country and for ceding his works to the country.

A statue of Gossweiler is located in the park next to the regional museum of Dundo. Two portraits of him were published in the 1950s.

== Collections in herbaria ==
Specimens Gossweiler collected can be found in the following herbaria:

Specimens collected by J. Gossweiler in herbaria
Abbr	Name	Location	Country	Specimens	Specimens online	Notes	Refs
LUAI, LUA	Luanda Herbarium		Angola	?	0	Herbarium of the Instituto de Investigação Agronómica (LUA) transferred from Huambo Province to Luanda in 1995 Duplicates of specimen collected	
LISC	Herbário do Instituto de Investigação Científica Tropical	Lisbon	Portugal		10800	Herbarium of Jardim Colonial (Lis.JC) or Centro de Botânica da Junta de Investigações Coloniais	
LISU	Herbarium of Museu Nacional de História Natural e da Ciência	Lisbon	Portugal	?	0	The herbarium of Jardim Botanico da Universidade (Lis.U) or Herbário da Universidade de Lisboa (LISU)	
BM	British Museum of Natural History herbarium	London	United Kingdom		1500	Botany collection database of the Natural History Museum (now separated from the British Museum)	
COI	University of Coimbra, Herbarium of the Department of Botany	Coimbra	Portugal		1200		
K	Royal Botanic Gardens, Kew herbarium	Kew	United Kingdom		800		
	National Herbarium of the Netherlands ^{(wd)}	Leiden	Netherlands		650		
	Hérbier du Muséum National d'Histoire Naturelle, Paris	Paris	France		300		
US	United States National Herbarium	Washington, D.C.	United States		200		
	National Herbarium of Belgium		Belgium		150	specimens from BM	
BD	Herbarium Berolinense	Berlin	Germany		70	part of Berlin-Dahlem Botanical Garden and Botanical Museum	
MO	Missouri Botanical Garden herbarium	St. Louis, Missouri	United States		60		
	GIBF-Sweden		Sweden		10		
Z, ZT	Herbaria of the University and ETH Zurich	Zürich	Switzerland		6		
	Harvard University Herbaria ^{(wd)}	Cambridge, Massachusetts	United States		5		

The table includes the number of specimen viewable online, either directly or through JSTOR.

== Publications ==
- Gossweiler, John (1918). Contribuição para o estudo da flora do Maiombe português: apontamentos sôbre algumas madeiras comerciais (in Portuguese). Luanda: Imprensa nacional de Angola.
- Gossweiler, John; Arthur Wallis Exell; Ronald Good; Spencer Le Marchant Moore; S. Greves; Edmund Gilbert Baker (1926). Mr. John Gossweiler's Plants from Angola and Portuguese Congo. London: R. Hardwicke.
- Alston, Arthur Hugh Garfit (1934). Mr. John Gossweiler's Plants from Angola and Portuguese Congo: Pteridophyta.
- Gossweiler, John; Mendonça, F.A. (1939). Carta fitogeográfica de Angola : Memória descritiva dos principais tipos de vegetação da colónia determinados pelos seus aspectos fisiográficos e caracteres ecológicos segundo a nomenclatura de Rübel (in Portuguese). Ed. do Government Geral de Angola.
- Gossweiler, John (1950). Flora exótica de Angola: nomes vulgares e origem das plantas cultivadas ou sub-espontâneas (in Portuguese). Luanda: Imprensa nacional.
- Gossweiler, John (1953). Nomes indígenas de plantas de Angola (in Portuguese). Luanda: Impr. Nacional.

Archive materials are held by:

- University of Coimbra: A few of his letters are available online in the digital library of the University of Coimbra
- Federal Archives of Switzerland
- Natural History Museum Archives, London

== Eponymy ==
- Gossweilera S.Moore
- Gossweilerochloa
- Gossweilerodendron Harms.

== Honours ==
- Commander of the Order of the Colonial Empire, Portugal (28 October 1935)
