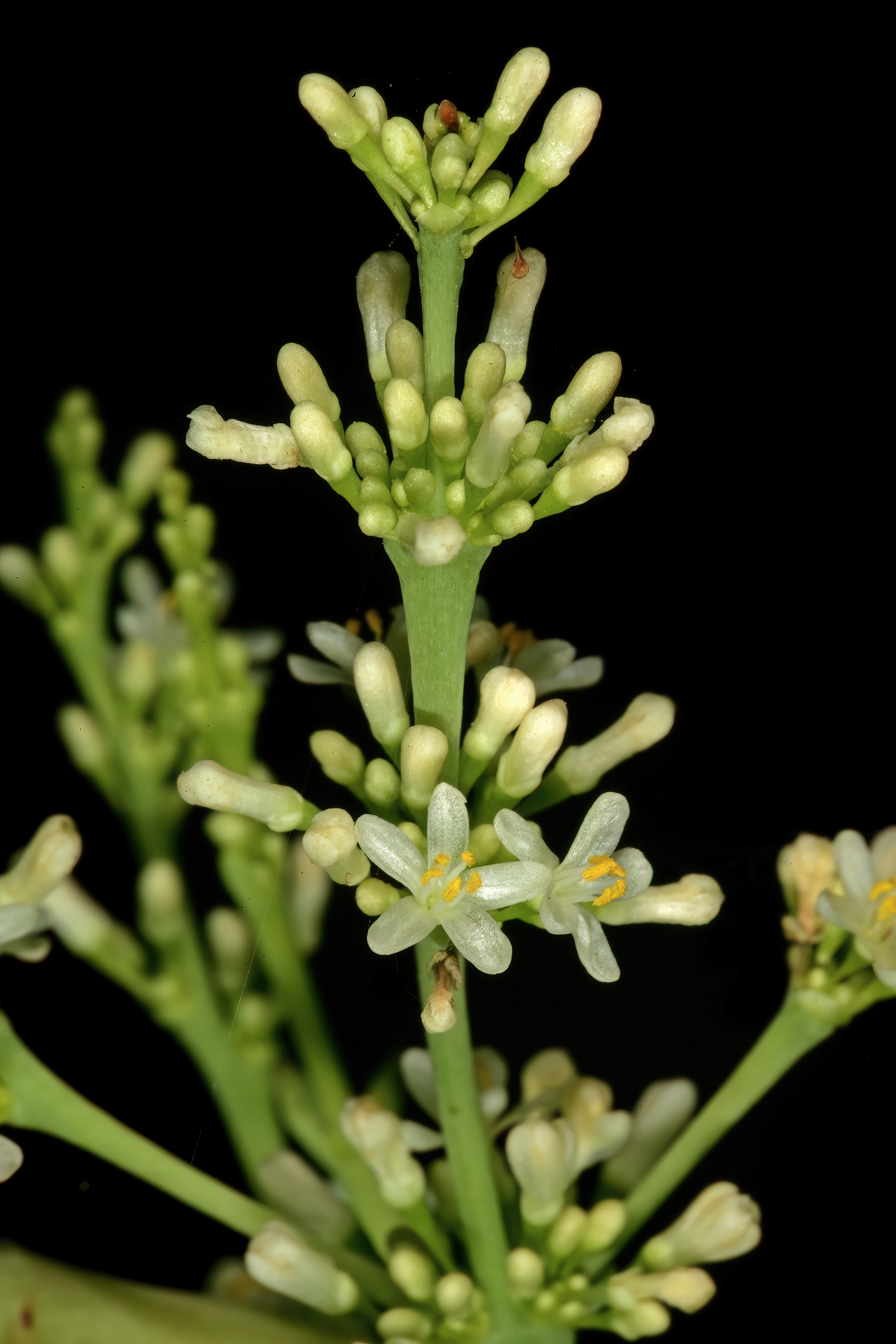

Scientific classification
- Kingdom: Plantae
- Clade: Tracheophytes
- Clade: Angiosperms
- Clade: Eudicots
- Order: Caryophyllales
- Family: Didiereaceae
- Genus: Portulacaria
- Species: P. armiana

Binomial name
- Portulacaria armiana van Jaarsv.

Synonyms
- Ceraria armiana

= Portulacaria armiana =

Species of succulent plant

Portulacaria armiana, also known as the whipstick-porkbush, is a species of succulent plant native to southwestern Namibia.

== Description ==
It grows as a low shrub. It can be distinguished from its relatives by its large, grey-green waxy leaves, and its extremely tall inflorescence ("whipstick"), which rises unusually high (up to 8 metres (26 ft)).

Within the genus Portulacaria, it is most closely related to its sister-species Portulacaria namaquensis.

== Distribution ==
Its natural habitat is the lower reaches of the Orange River valley of Namibia, near the border with South Africa. In this extremely arid, winter-rainfall area, it favours mildly acidic sands on high granite outcrops.

It grows in full sun in extremely well-drained soil, and can be propagated by seed or cuttings.
