= Neostenanthera robsonii =

Conservation status
- Least Concern (IUCN 3.1)

Scientific classification
- Kingdom: Plantae
- Clade: Embryophytes
- Clade: Tracheophytes
- Clade: Spermatophytes
- Clade: Angiosperms
- Clade: Magnoliids
- Order: Magnoliales
- Family: Annonaceae
- Genus: Neostenanthera
- Species: N. robsonii

Binomial name
- Neostenanthera robsonii Le Thomas

Species of flowering plant

Neostenanthera robsonii is a species of plant in the Annonaceae family. It is endemic to Gabon.
