= Gossweilera =

Scientific classification
- Kingdom: Plantae
- Clade: Tracheophytes
- Clade: Angiosperms
- Clade: Eudicots
- Clade: Asterids
- Order: Asterales
- Family: Asteraceae
- Subfamily: Vernonioideae
- Tribe: Vernonieae
- Genus: Gossweilera; S.Moore

Type species
- Gossweilera lanceolata S.Moore

Genus of flowering plants

Gossweilera is a genus of flowering plants in the family Asteraceae. It is endemic to Angola. The genus is named for the Swiss-born Angolan botanist, John Gossweiler (1873-1952), who collected the type specimen of Gossweilera lanceolata.

== Species ==
As of May 2024, Plants of the World Online accepted two species:

- Gossweilera lanceolata S.Moore – Angola
- Gossweilera paludosa S.Moore – Angola
