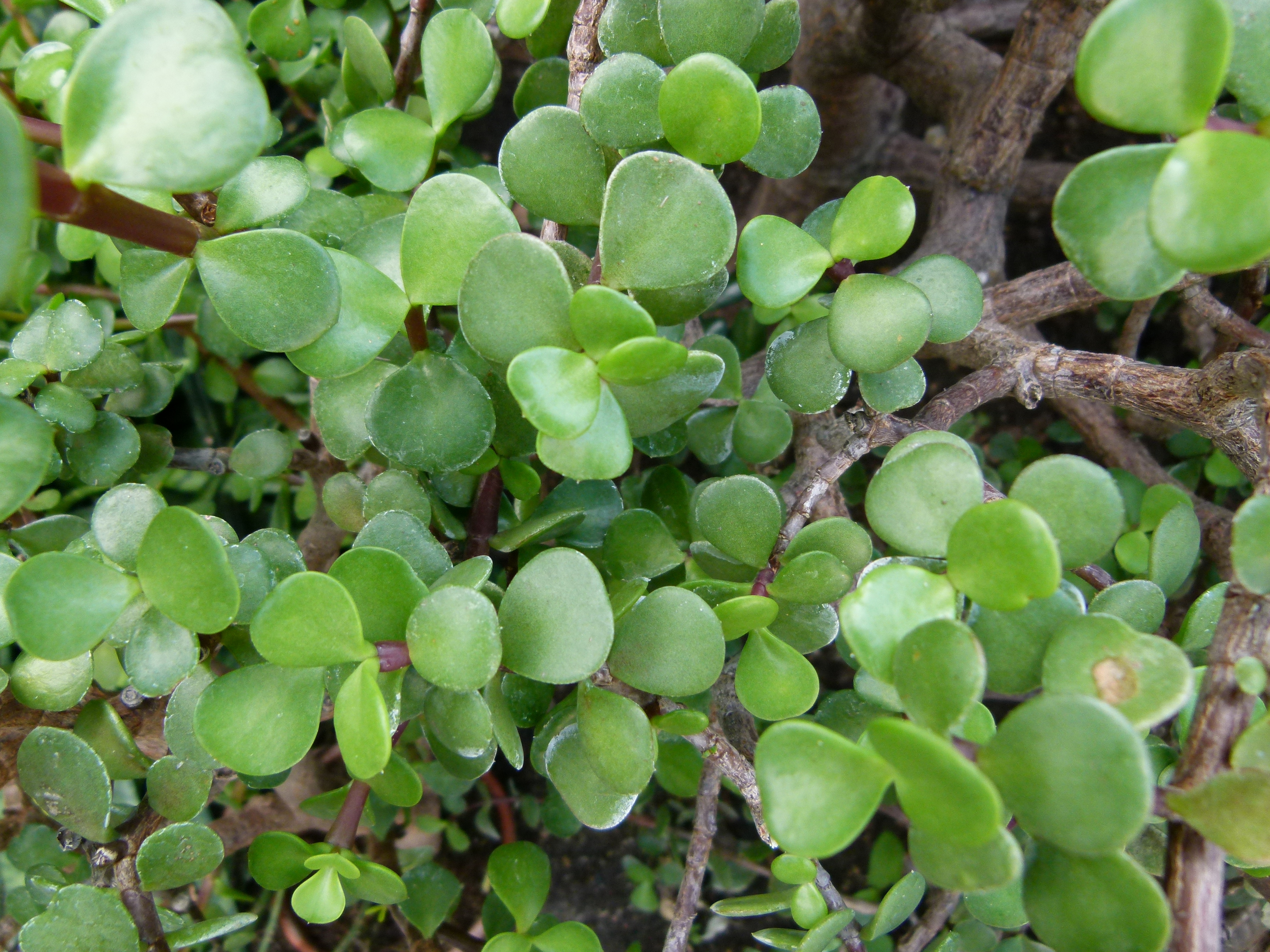

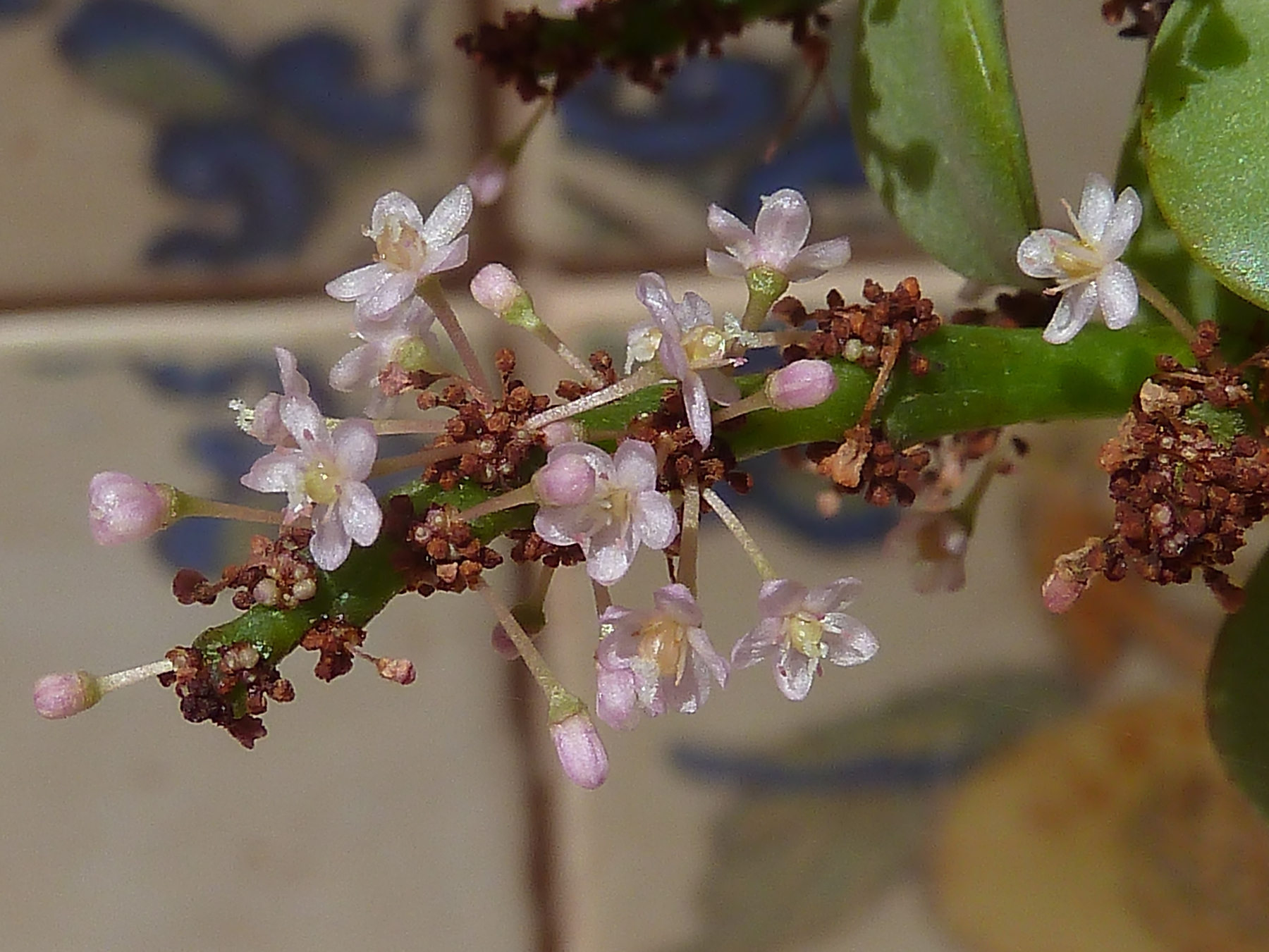

Conservation status
- Least Concern (IUCN 3.1)

Scientific classification
- Kingdom: Plantae
- Clade: Tracheophytes
- Clade: Angiosperms
- Clade: Eudicots
- Order: Caryophyllales
- Family: Didiereaceae
- Genus: Portulacaria
- Species: P. afra

Binomial name
- Portulacaria afra Jacq.

= Portulacaria afra =

Species of succulent plant

Portulacaria afra (known as elephant bush, porkbush, purslane tree, dwarf jade and spekboom in Afrikaans) is a small-leaved succulent plant found in South Africa. These succulents commonly have a reddish stem and green leaves, but a variegated cultivar is often seen in cultivation. They are simple to care for and make easy houseplants for a sunny location. In frost-free regions they may be used in outdoor landscaping.

== Description ==
It is a soft-wooded, semi-evergreen upright shrub or small tree, usually 2.5–4.5 metres (8–15 ft) tall. P. afra has smaller and rounder pads and more compact growth (shorter internodal spaces, down to 1.5 millimetres (0.059 in)). It is much hardier, faster growing, more loosely branched, and has more limber tapering branches than Crassula once established.

The genus Portulacaria has been shown to be an outlier, relatively unrelated to the other genera in the family, which are all restricted to small ranges in the arid far west of Southern Africa.

== Distribution and habitat ==
It is very widespread in the east of South Africa (as well as Eswatini). In this moist climate, it is relatively rare, and tends to favour dryer rocky outcrops and slopes.

It is also found in much denser numbers in the dryer southern Cape. Here it occurs from the Little Karoo of the Western Cape, eastwards up until the thicket vegetation of the Eastern Cape. Spekboom is found most prolifically in the Albany thickets, a woodland ecoregion, which locally is often called noorsveld, after the high number of succulent Euphorbia species, which are often called noors plants. In these environments, P. afra is a source of food for multiple large herbivores, such as the black rhinoceros and the African elephant. Although it is not the primary food source for these animals, it still makes up a significant portion of their diet.

P. afra is considered a keystone species in the shrubland thicket subregions of the Albany thickets due to its resistance to drought, flood, and fire. When it is not the dominant species, spekboom borders shrubland thickets and protects interior growth. Its growth rate is not dependent on water availability, and spekboom is able to accumulate biomass in excess of what would be predicted by rainfall levels in the area. Despite its ecological significance, ecologists in the region are advised to avoid introducing spekboom in subregions where it is not already present due to its ability to rapidly gain biomass.

== Cultivation and uses ==
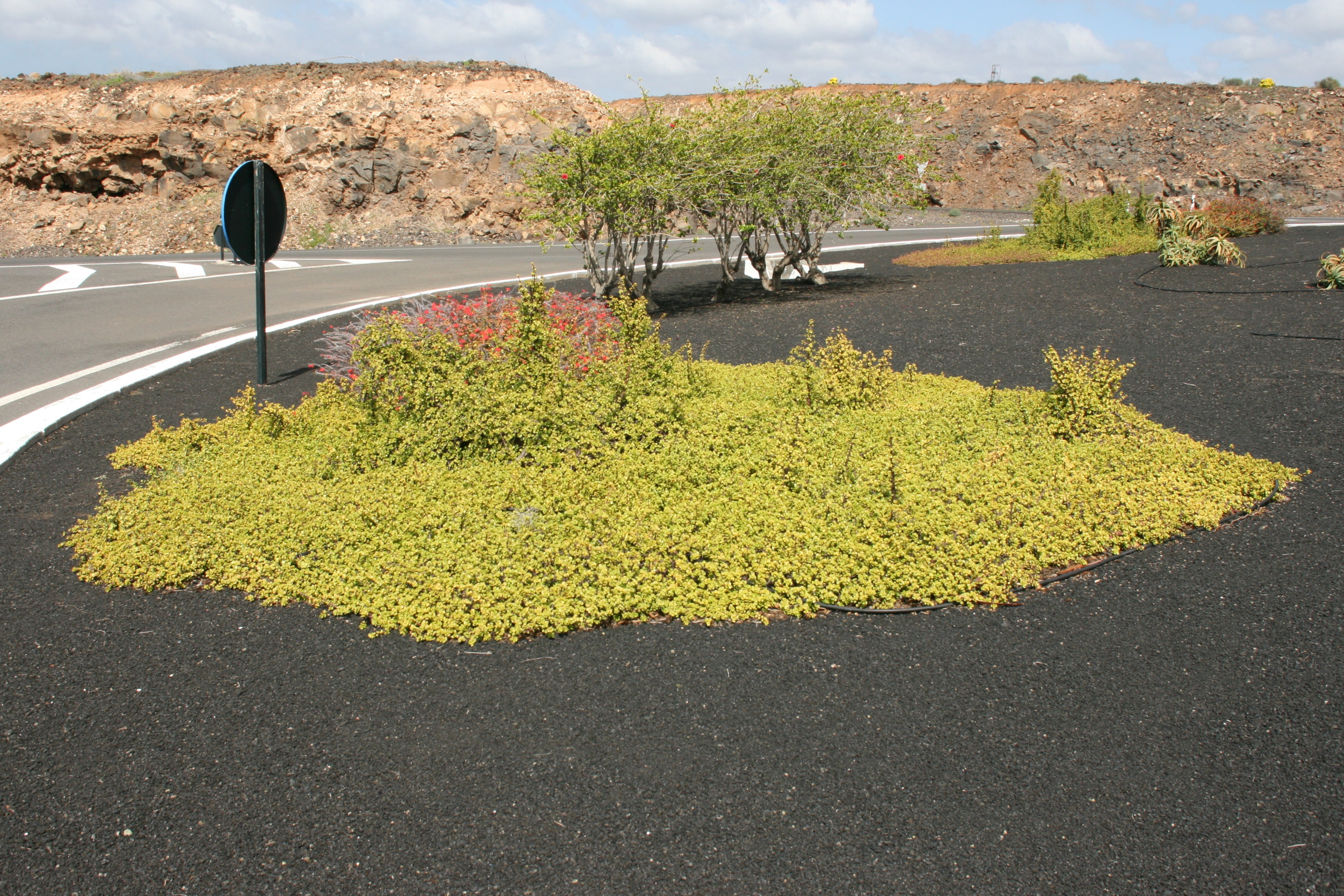
"Prostrata" decumbent variety

In the wilds of South Africa, large plants do survive the winter frosts by growing dense enough to provide their own natural cover. Drought-tolerant and fire-resistant, it will endure desert sun and heat once established, which the jade plant will not. P. afra is a common landscape plant in Phoenix, Arizona, and southern California, growing in USDA plant hardiness zones 9–11. Cuttings root very easily in most potting media.

=== Ornamental ===
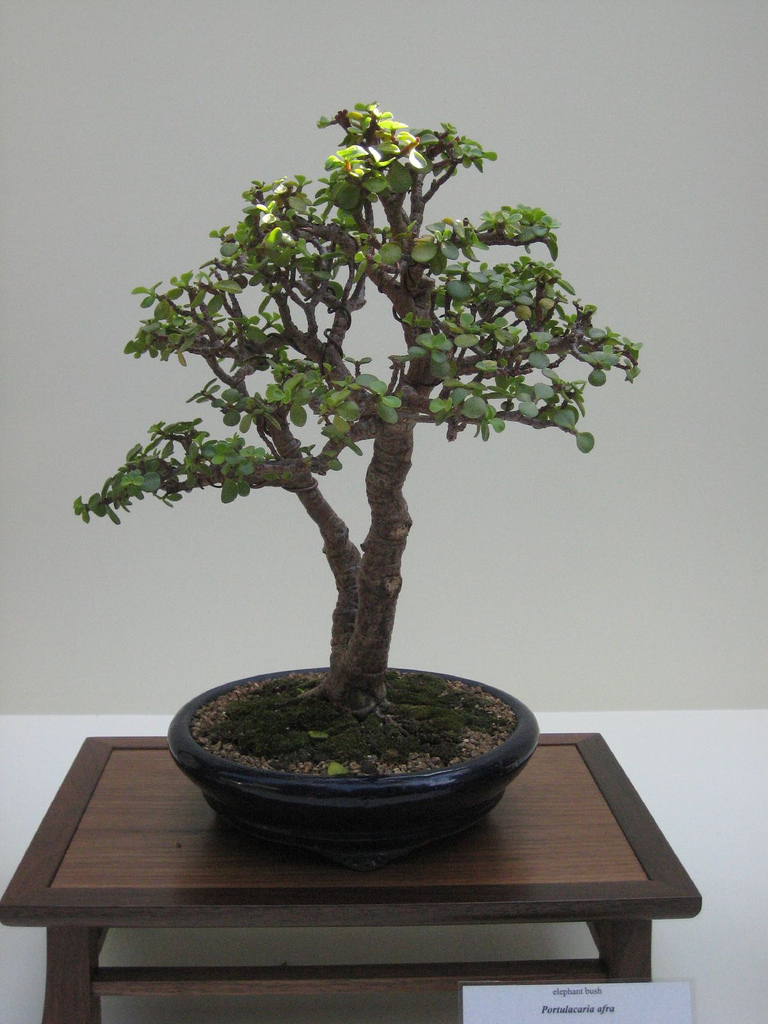
P. afra cultivated as a bonsai

It is popular as a specimen for bonsai, and as a hardy xeriscaping plant.

Several varieties exist – some bred in cultivation, others naturally occurring:

- "Limpopo": A variety with much larger leaves. It is the natural form from the far north of the species' range.
- "Prostrata": A low-lying, decumbent form that is frequently used as a groundcover.
- "Aurea": A compact, upright form with rounded leaves that go bright yellow in the sun.
- "Foliis variegatus": A variegated form.
- "Medio-picta": Variegated with a lighter centre.

=== Culinary ===
In Southern Africa it is commonly eaten, usually as one component of a salad or a soup. It should not be confused with the jade plant, which is mildly toxic.

P. afra is also used to feed livestock during periods of drought due to its succulent nature. Most commonly used for cattle and goats, these plants also act as a supplemental source of water on top of their nutritional benefits for livestock.

=== Medicinal ===
This is one of the many plants used as a traditional treatment for skin conditions used by people in rural areas that do not have easy access to more modern medicine.

=== Carbon sequestration and ecological impact ===
P. afra is capable of either C_{3} or CAM carbon fixation, depending on factors such as the season and the age of the leaves. In the dry season, it relies on the CAM pathway due to the lack of water, but when water is reintroduced, the plant quickly reverts to the C_{3} pathway in order to conserve energy. The maturity of the leaf tissue also matters because younger tissue is unable to completely seal the stomata, making CAM impossible. So while the older leaves are able to switch pathways based on the season and conditions, the younger leaves have to rely solely on the C_{3} pathway. It can sequester a maximum of 15.4 t CO_{2} ha^{−1}yr^{−1}.

The South African government's Working for Ecosystems programme proposes restoring a million hectares (2.5 million acres) of P. afra thicket. The addition of more spekboom into the environment can also help restore native species to areas where they no longer can grow. P. afra has been shown to help create shade and add organic material into sandy soil, which allows for an environment more hospitable to young plants, thus helping restore populations of native species that were reduced by overgrazing and desertification.
