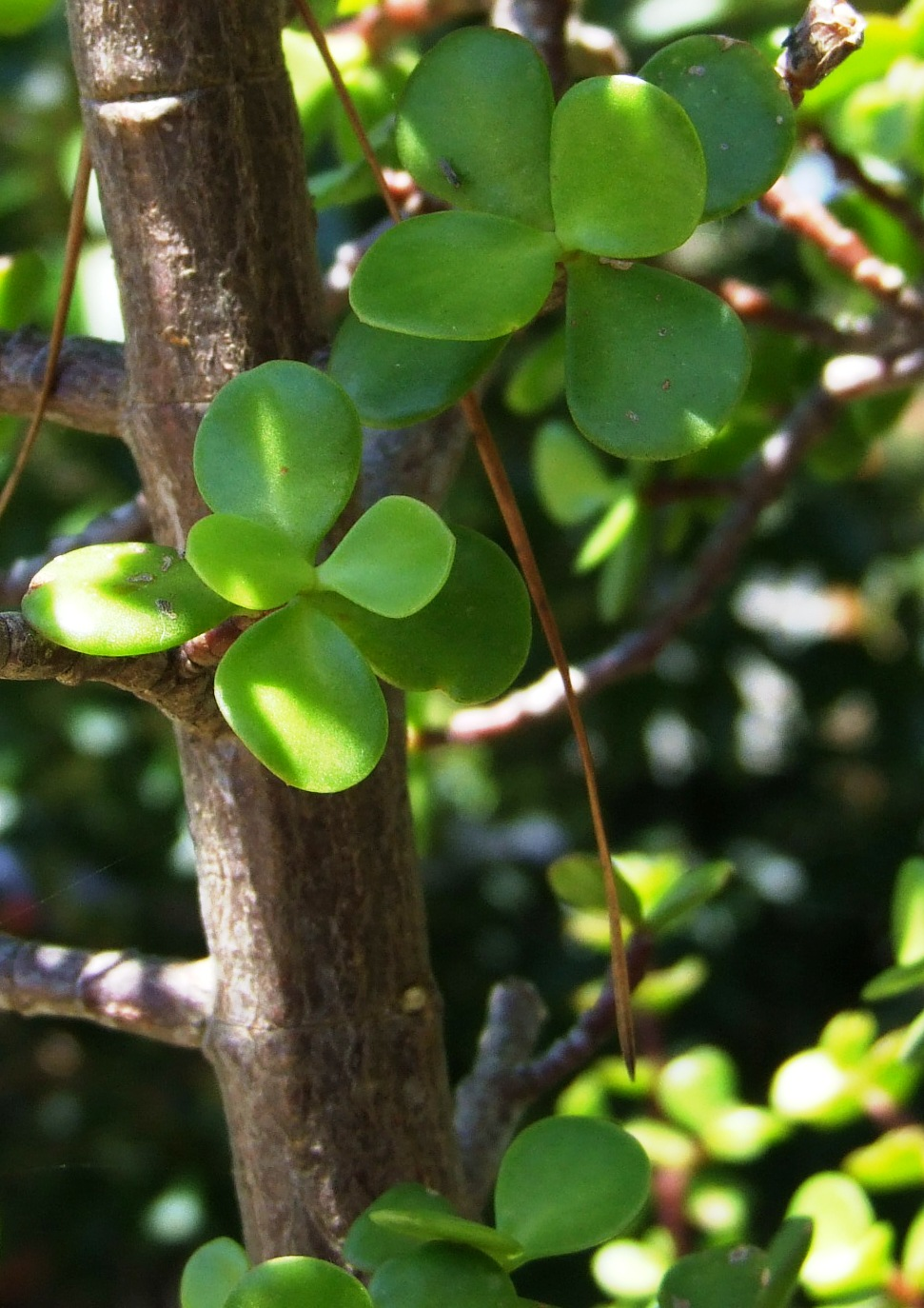
- Portulacaria afra
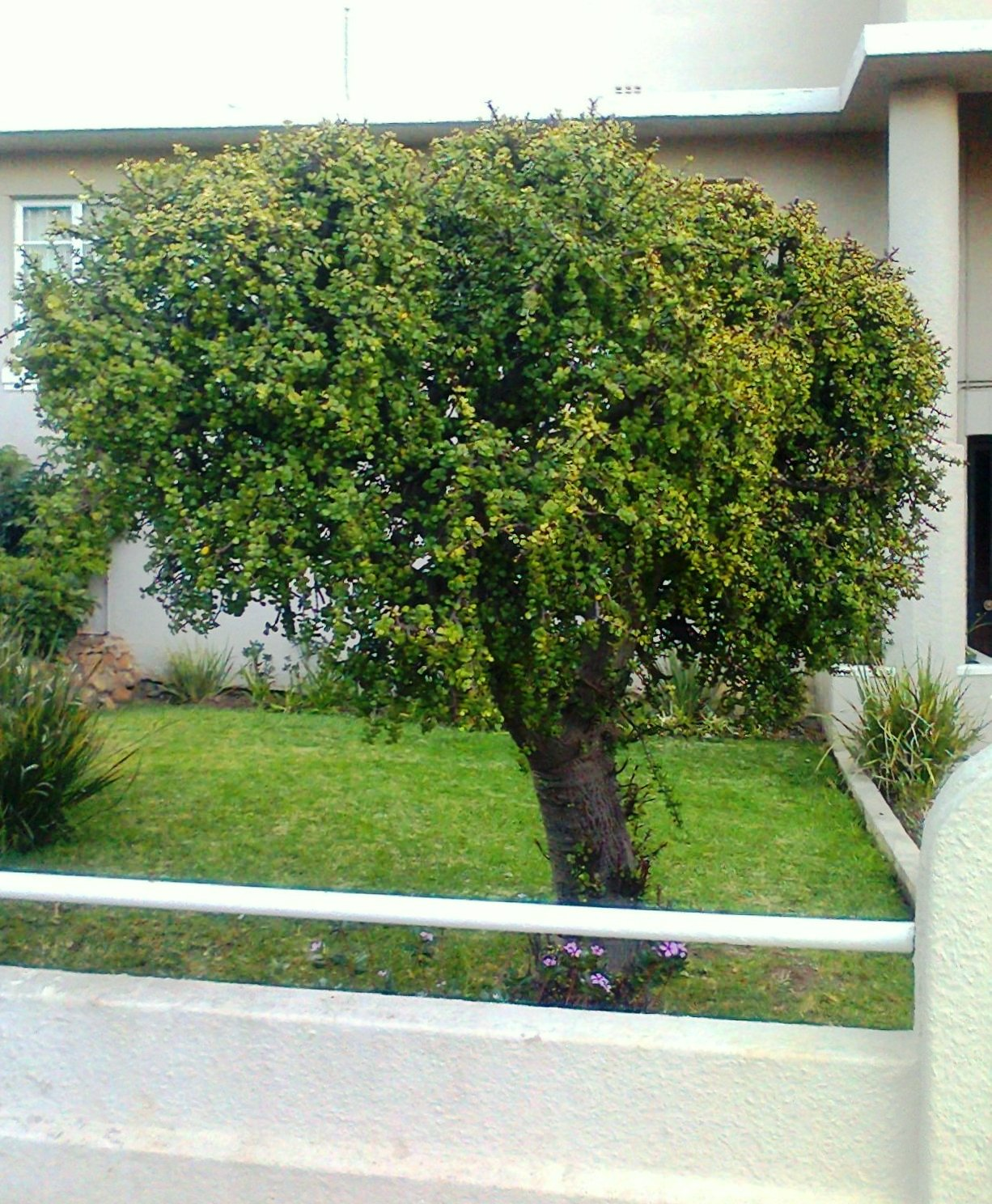
- Mature Portulacaria afra

Scientific classification
- Kingdom: Plantae
- Clade: Tracheophytes
- Clade: Angiosperms
- Clade: Eudicots
- Order: Caryophyllales
- Family: Didiereaceae
- Subfamily: Portulacarioideae
- Genus: Portulacaria; Jacq.

= Portulacaria =

Genus of succulent plants

Portulacaria is a genus of succulent plant, classified in its own subfamily Portulacarioideae in the family Didiereaceae. It is indigenous to southern Africa.

== Taxonomy ==
The genus was previously placed in the family Portulacaceae, but according to molecular studies is part of Didiereaceae.

It has further been revised when phylogenetic tests showed conclusively that genus Ceraria was located within Portulacaria, and all Ceraria species have consequently been renamed and moved into this genus.

=== Species ===
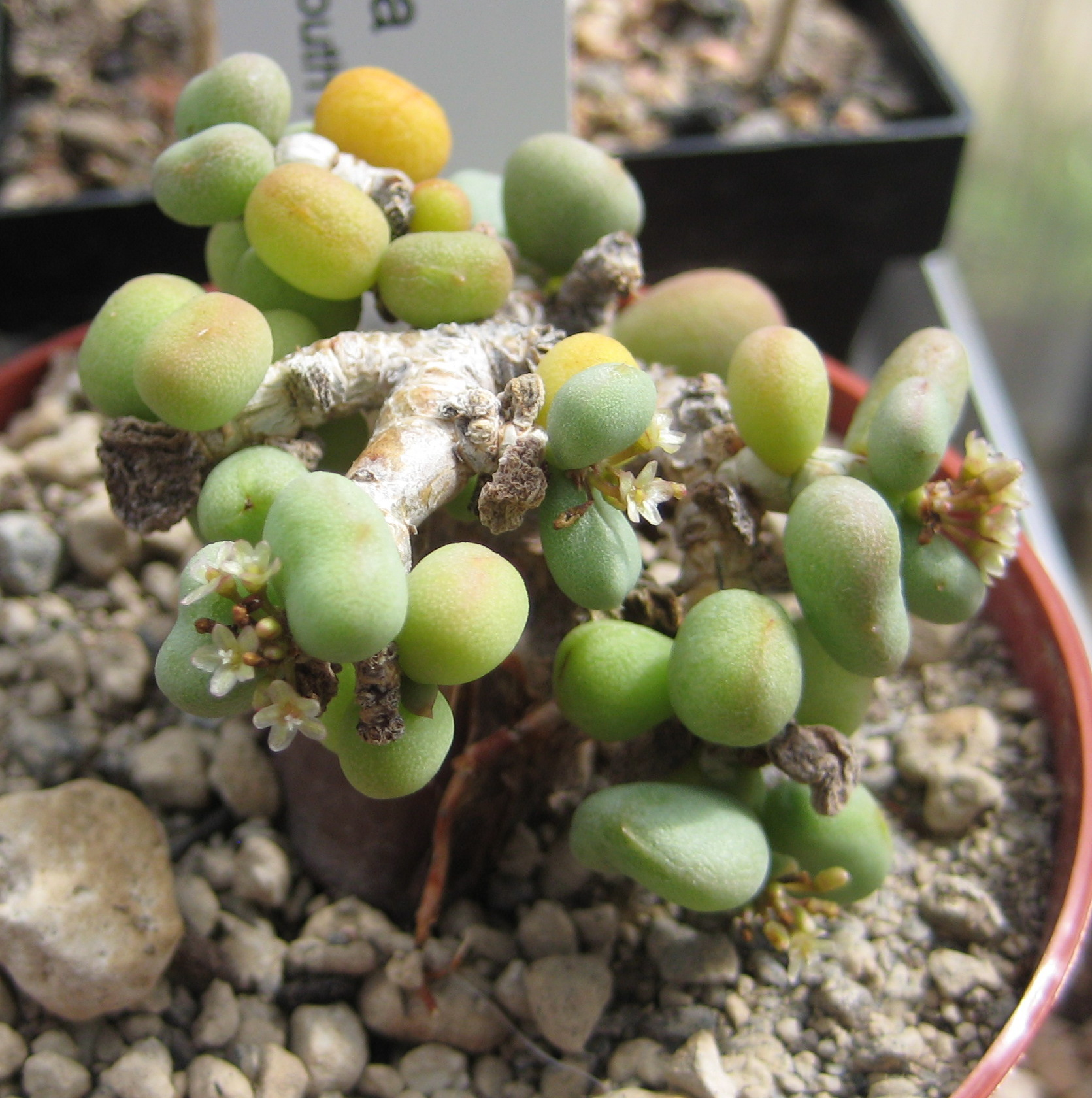
Portulacaria pygmaea (formerly Ceraria pygmaea)

As of March 2024, Plants of the World Online accepted the following species:

- Portulacaria afra Jacq.
- Portulacaria armiana van Jaarsv.
- Portulacaria carrissoana (Exell & Mendonça) Bruyns & Klak, syn. Ceraria carrissoana Excell & Mendonca
- Portulacaria fruticulosa (H.Pearson & Stephens) Bruyns & Klak, syn. Ceraria fruticulosa Pearson & Stephens
- Portulacaria longipedunculata (Merxm. & Podlech) Bruyns & Klak, syn. Ceraria longipedunculata Merxm & Podlech
- Portulacaria namaquensis Sond., syn. Ceraria namaquensis Sond.
- Portulacaria pygmaea Pillans, syn. Ceraria pygmaea Pillans

== Uses ==
Portulacaria afra normally uses C_{3} (or Hatch-Slack) carbon fixation but is also able to switch to CAM carbon fixation when drought stressed.

It is a local delicacy and its leaves are eaten by the local peoples. It is also popular internationally as a garden plant. Because of its superficial resemblance to some species in the family Crassulaceae, most of which are toxic, the two are readily, and possibly dangerously, confused by people unaware of the differences.
