= Francisco de Ascensão Mendonça =

Portuguese botanist

Francisco de Ascensão Mendonça (30 May 1889 - 28 September 1982) was a Portuguese botanist.
