= Arthur Wallis Exell =

British botanist (1901–1993)

- Arthur Wallis Exell at his cottage in Blockley (1991)
- Born: 21 May 1901; Birmingham, U.K.
- Died: 15 January 1993 (aged 91); Cheltenham, U.K.
- Education: Warwickshire Queen Elizabeth Grammar School; Birmingham King Edmund's School; Emmanuel College, Cambridge
- Spouse: Mildred Alice Haydon
- Parent(s): William Wallis Exell (father) and Jessie Clara Holmes (mother)
- Relatives: Maurice Herbert Exell and Ernest George Exell (brothers)
- Scientific career
- Fields: Botanists taxonomy and cryptography

Arthur Wallis Exell OBE (21 May 1901 in Birmingham – 15 January 1993 in Cheltenham) was initially an assistant and later Deputy Keeper of Botany at the British Museum during the years 1924–1939 and 1950–1962. A noted cryptographer, taxonomist and phytogeographer, he was notable for his furthering of botanical exploration in tropical and sub-tropical Africa, and was an authority on the family Combretaceae.

Exell's formal education started at Queen Elizabeth Grammar School in Warwickshire, and then King Edmund's School in Birmingham. From there he went on to Emmanuel College, Cambridge and was awarded an M.A. in 1926, having joined the British Museum as a second-class assistant on 11 August 1924, eventually becoming Deputy Keeper of Botany in 1950. He was entrusted with the Polypetalae, although his first paper was a morphological study of the hymenium in three species of fungus.

Exell's first contact with Africa was in 1932/3 when he travelled to the islands in the Gulf of Guinea – São Tomé and Principe, Bioko and Annobón. His reports on the expedition were published in 1944 as a "Catalogue of the Vascular Plants of S. Tome", which for many years served as the standard reference to the islands' flora. The expedition also acquainted Exell with the Portuguese botanists Luis Carrisso and Francisco de Ascensão Mendonça of Coimbra University. Accompanied by them and his wife, Exell launched into a study of the flora of Angola, at that time a Portuguese colony. Also in their group was John Gossweiler (1873–1952), the government botanist in Angola. During the journey Carrisso suffered a fatal heart attack. Exell continued his collaboration with Coimbra University and Mendonça, publishing the first volume of the "Conspectus Florae Angolensis" (1937–1951).

During the Second World War, Exell's knowledge of Portuguese – he was also fluent in French and German – led to his being seconded to the Government Communications Headquarters at Bletchley Park, and working as a cryptographer in Cheltenham. Returning to the British Museum (Natural History) in 1950, he founded the 'Association pour l'Etude Taxonomique de la Flore d'Afrique Tropicale' (AETFAT) and started the Flora Zambesiaca project, the flora covering the catchment area of the Zambesi River, which at the time comprised the Federation of Rhodesia and Nyasaland, Bechuanaland, the Caprivi strip and Mozambique. He visited the region in 1955 with Mendonça to make further collections. He was co-editor of Flora Zambesiaca from 1962 onwards, and was awarded a D.Sc. by the University of Coimbra in Portugal in 1962. In 1971 the Portuguese government conferred on him the 'Comendador Da Ordem De Santiago da Espada'. He also received the Order of the British Empire in 1961, and was a member of the Linnean Society of London and other scientific societies.

Exell left the British Museum as Deputy Keeper of Botany in 1962. While remote working, he carried out part-time work for the Royal Botanic Gardens, Kew. On his retirement, he and his wife moved to the village of Blockley in the Cotswolds, becoming involved in local affairs.

== Associates ==
- Mendonça, Francisco de Ascencão (1889–1982) (co-collector)
- Wild, Hiram (1917–1982) (co-collector)
- Gossweiler, John (1873–1952) (co-collector)
- Carrisso, Luis Wettnich (1886–1937)

== Family ==
Arthur and his brothers Maurice Herbert Exell (1905–1966) and Ernest George Exell (1907–1986) were the sons of William Wallis Exell (1868 Ballarat, Victoria, Australia – 1938 Amersham, Buckinghamshire) and Jessie Clara Holmes (1869–1956). Arthur married Mildred Alice Haydon (25 January 1905 Wandsworth, London – August 1990 North Cotswolds, Gloucestershire) on 14 August 1929 at Wandsworth, Surrey. William Wallis Exell's parents were George Exell (1834–1921) and Sarah Wallis (1844–1909).

== Eponymy ==
Numerous taxa were named in his honour

- Exellia Boutique in Annonaceae
- Barleria exellii Benoist
- Hermbstaedtia exellii (Suess.) C.C.Towns.
- Anisophyllea exellii P.A.Duvign. & Dewit
- Piptostigma exellii R.E.Fr.
- Anthericum exellii Poelln.
- Marsdenia exellii C.Norman
- Anisopappus exellii Wild
- Impatiens exellii G.M.Schulze
- Combretum exellii Jongkind
- Kalanchoe exellii Raym.-Hamet
- Geranium exellii J.R.Laundon
- Perlebia exellii (Torre & Hillc.) A.Schmitz
- Phragmanthera exellii Balle ex Polhill & Wiens
- Hibiscus exellii Baker f.
- Memecylon exellii A.Fern. & R.Fern.
- Tridactyle exellii P.J.Cribb & Stévart
- Pavetta exellii Bremek.
- Psychotria exellii R.Alves, Figueiredo & A.P.Davis
- Sabicea exellii G.Taylor

== Publications ==
- Mr. John Gossweiler's Plants from Angola and Portuguese Congo, 1926–1929 (Jl. of Bot., Suppl.)
- Two new species of Terminalia from the Austral Islands and Mangareva (1936)
- Parmi d'autres auteurs Conspectus Florae Angolensis (1937)
- Catalogue of the Vascular Plants of S. Tome (with Principe and Annobon) (1944)
- A Revision of the Genera Buchenavia and Ramatuella (Bulletin of the British Museum) – with Clive Anthony Stace (1963)
- Joanna Southcott at Blockley and the Rock Cottage Relics (1977)
- Exell, Arthur Wallis (1984). "In Memory of Francisco de Ascensão Mendonça". Garcia de Orta, Série de Botânica. 1 (1–2): 1–6. ISSN 0379-9506.
- History of the Ladybird: With some Diversions on This and That (1989)
- Old Photographs of Blockley, Chipping Campden, Chipping Norton and Moreton in Marsh – Arthur Wallis Exell (1983)
- Amazon Books

== See also ==
- Francisco de Ascensão Mendonça (1889–1982)
