= Carnivorous plant =

Plants that consume animals

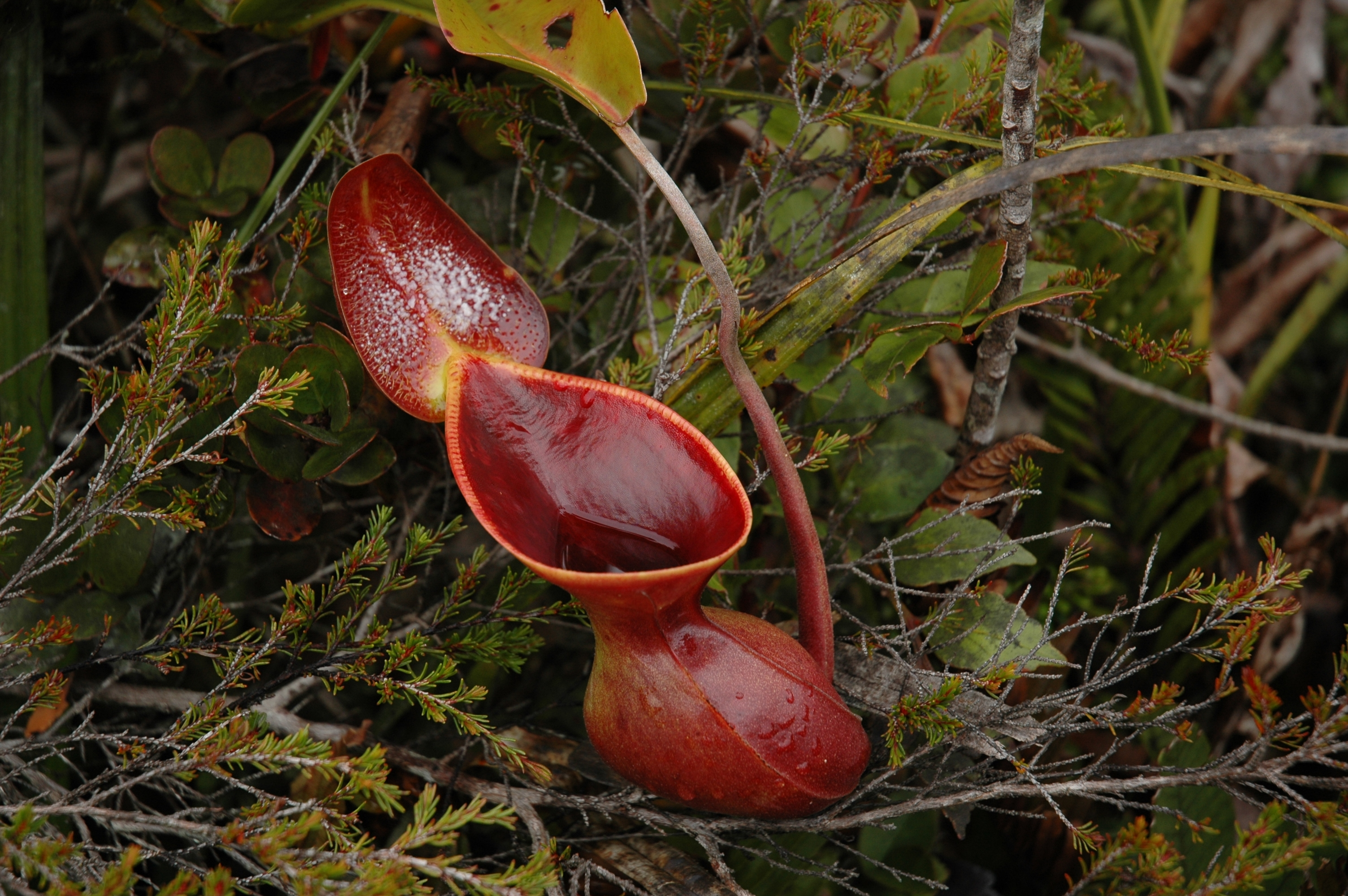
An upper pitcher of Nepenthes lowii, a tropical pitcher plant that supplements its carnivorous diet with tree shrew droppings.

Carnivorous plants are plants that derive some or most of their nutrients from trapping and consuming animals or protozoans, typically insects and other arthropods, and occasionally small mammals and birds. They have adapted to grow in waterlogged sunny places where the soil is thin or poor in nutrients, especially nitrogen, such as acidic bogs. They can be found on all continents except Antarctica, as well as many Pacific islands. In 1875, Charles Darwin published Insectivorous Plants, the first treatise to recognize the significance of carnivory in plants, describing years of his research.

True carnivory is believed to have evolved independently at least 12 times in five different orders of flowering plants, and is represented by more than a dozen genera. This classification includes at least 583 species that attract, trap, and kill prey, absorbing the resulting available nutrients. Venus flytraps (Dionaea muscipula), pitcher plants, and bladderworts (Utricularia spp.) can be seen as exemplars of key traits genetically associated with carnivory: trap leaf development, prey digestion, and nutrient absorption.

There are at least 800 species of carnivorous plants. The number of known species has increased by approximately 3 species per year since the year 2000. Additionally, over 300 protocarnivorous plant species in several genera show some but not all of these characteristics. A 2020 assessment has found that roughly one quarter are threatened with extinction from human actions.

== Characteristics ==
Plants are considered carnivorous if they have these five traits:

1. capture prey in traps
2. kill the captured prey
3. digest the captured prey
4. absorb nutrients from the killed and digested prey
5. use those nutrients to grow and develop.

Other traits may include the attraction and retention of prey.

== Trapping mechanisms ==
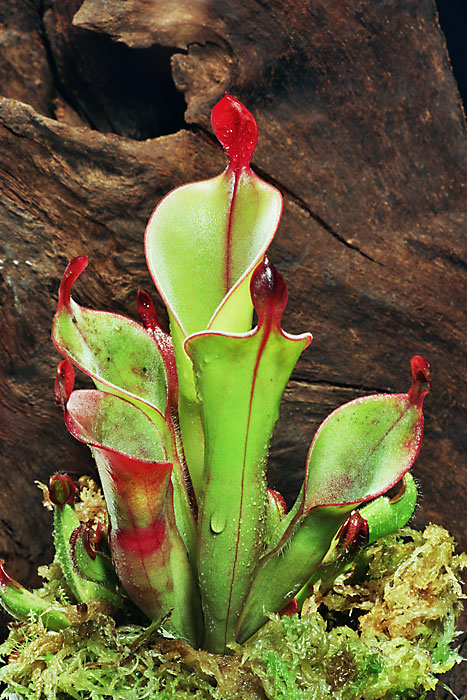
The pitchers of Heliamphora chimantensis are an example of pitfall traps.

Five basic trapping mechanisms are found in carnivorous plants.

1. Pitfall traps (pitcher plants) trap prey in a rolled leaf that contains a pool of digestive enzymes or bacteria.
2. Flypaper traps use a sticky mucilage.
3. Snap traps utilise rapid leaf movements.
4. Bladder traps suck in prey with a bladder that generates an internal vacuum.
5. Lobster-pot traps, also known as eel traps, use inward-pointing hairs to force prey to move towards a digestive organ.

These traps may be active or passive, depending on whether movement aids the capture of prey. For example, Triphyophyllum is a passive flypaper that secretes mucilage, but whose leaves do not grow or move in response to prey capture. Meanwhile, sundews are active flypaper traps whose leaves undergo rapid acid growth, which is an expansion of individual cells as opposed to cell division. The rapid acid growth allows the sundews' tentacles to bend, aiding in the retention and digestion of prey.

=== Pitfall traps ===
Characterised by an internal chamber, pitfall traps are thought to have evolved independently at least six times. This particular adaptation is found within the families Sarraceniaceae (Darlingtonia, Heliamphora, Sarracenia), Nepenthaceae (Nepenthes), and Cephalotaceae (Cephalotus). Within the family Bromeliaceae, pitcher morphology and carnivory evolved twice (Brocchinia and Catopsis). Because these families do not share a common ancestor who also had pitfall trap morphology, carnivorous pitchers are an example of convergent evolution.

A passive trap, pitfall traps attract prey with nectar bribes secreted by the peristome and bright flower-like anthocyanin patterning within the pitcher. The linings of most pitcher plants are covered in a loose coating of waxy flakes which are slippery for insects, causing them to fall into the pitcher. Once within the pitcher structure, digestive enzymes or mutualistic species break down the prey into an absorbable form for the plant. Water can become trapped within the pitcher, making a habitat for other flora and fauna. This type of 'water body' is called a phytotelma.

The simplest pitcher plants are probably those of Heliamphora, the marsh pitcher plant. In this genus, the traps are clearly derived from a simple rolled leaf whose margins have sealed together. These plants live in areas of high rainfall in South America such as Mount Roraima and consequently have a problem ensuring their pitchers do not overflow. To counteract this problem, natural selection has favoured the evolution of an overflow similar to that of a bathroom sink—a small gap in the zipped-up leaf margins allows excess water to flow out of the pitcher.

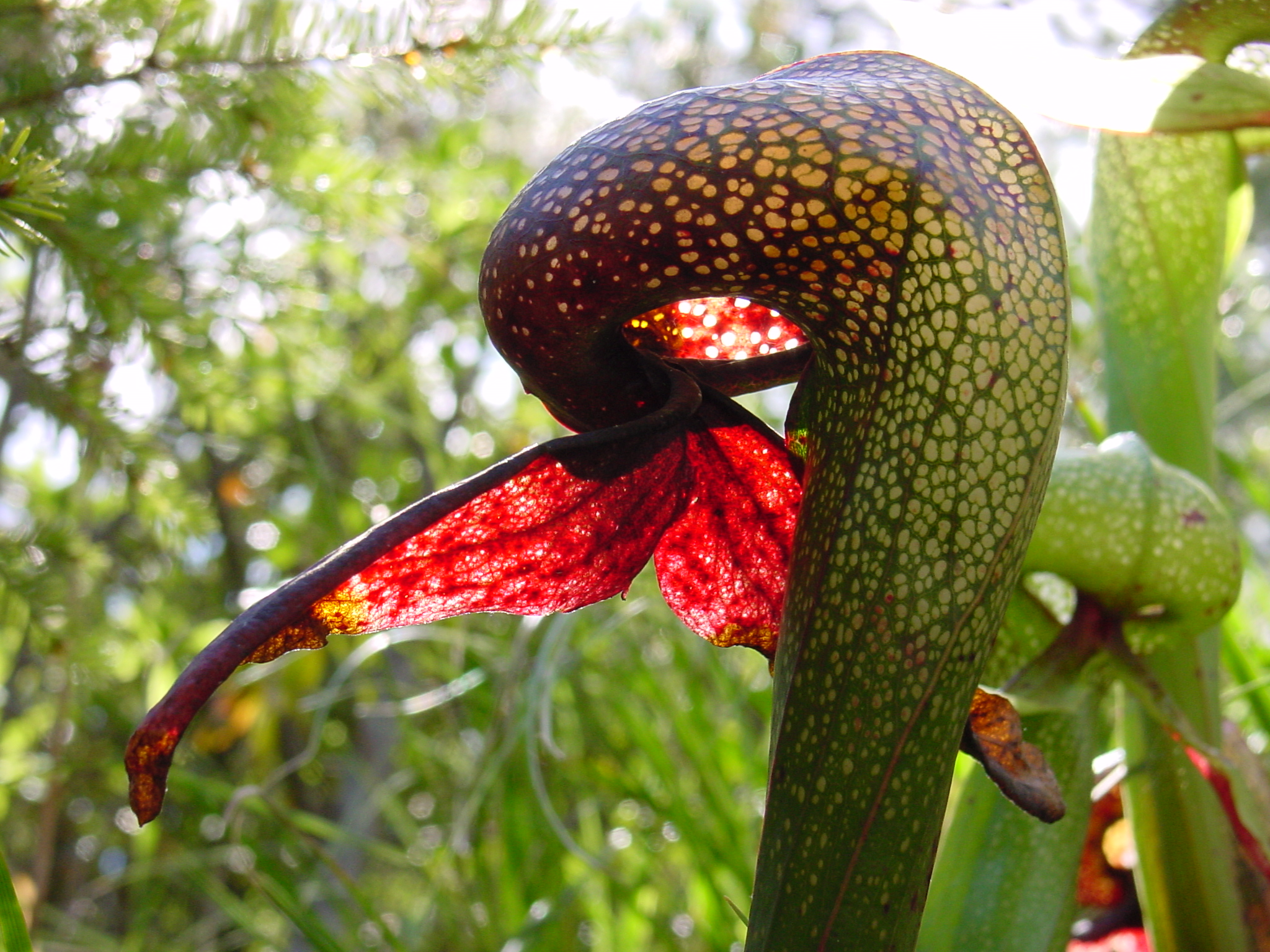
Darlingtonia californica: note the small entrance to the trap underneath the swollen "balloon" and the colourless patches that confuse prey trapped inside.

In the genus Sarracenia, the problem of pitcher overflow is solved by an operculum, which is essentially a flared leaflet that covers the opening of the rolled-leaf tube and protects it from rain. Possibly because of this improved waterproofing, Sarracenia species secrete enzymes such as proteases and phosphatases into the digestive fluid at the bottom of the pitcher. In at least one species, Sarracenia flava, the nectar bribe is laced with coniine, a toxic alkaloid also found in hemlock, which probably increases the efficiency of the traps by intoxicating prey.

Most Heliamphora rely on bacterial digestion alone with the exception of a single species, Heliamphora tatei, which does produce digestive enzymes. The enzymes digest the proteins and nucleic acids in the prey, releasing amino acids and phosphate ions, which the plant absorbs.

Darlingtonia californica, the cobra plant, possesses an adaptation also found in Sarracenia psittacina and, to a lesser extent, in Sarracenia minor: the operculum is balloon-like and almost seals the opening to the tube. This balloon-like chamber is pitted with areolae, chlorophyll-free patches through which light can penetrate. Insects, mostly ants, enter the chamber via the opening underneath the balloon. Once inside, they tire themselves trying to escape from these false exits, until they eventually fall into the tube. Prey access is increased by the "fish tails", outgrowths of the operculum that give the plant its name. Some seedling Sarracenia species also have long, overhanging opercular outgrowths; Darlingtonia may therefore represent an example of neoteny.

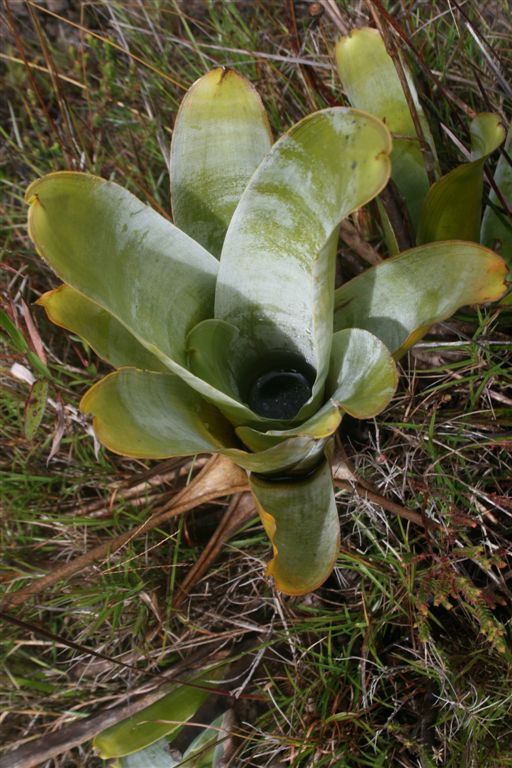
Brocchinia reducta: a carnivorous bromeliad

The second major group of pitcher plants are the monkey cups or tropical pitcher plants of the genus Nepenthes. In the hundred or so species of this genus, the pitcher is borne at the end of a tendril, which grows as an extension to the midrib of the leaf. Most species catch insects, although the larger ones, such as Nepenthes rajah, also occasionally take small mammals and reptiles. Nepenthes bicalcarata possesses two sharp thorns that project from the base of the operculum over the entrance to the pitcher. These likely serve to lure insects into a precarious position over the pitcher mouth, where they may lose their footing and fall into the fluid within.

The pitfall trap has evolved independently in at least two other groups. The Albany pitcher plant, Cephalotus follicularis, is a small pitcher plant from Western Australia, with moccasin-like pitchers. The rim of its pitcher's opening (the peristome) is particularly pronounced (both secrete nectar) and provides a thorny overhang to the opening, preventing trapped insects from climbing out.

The final carnivore with a pitfall-like trap is the bromeliad Brocchinia reducta. The tightly packed, waxy leaf bases of the strap-like leaves of this species form an urn. In most bromeliads, water collects readily in this urn and may provide habitats for frogs or insects.

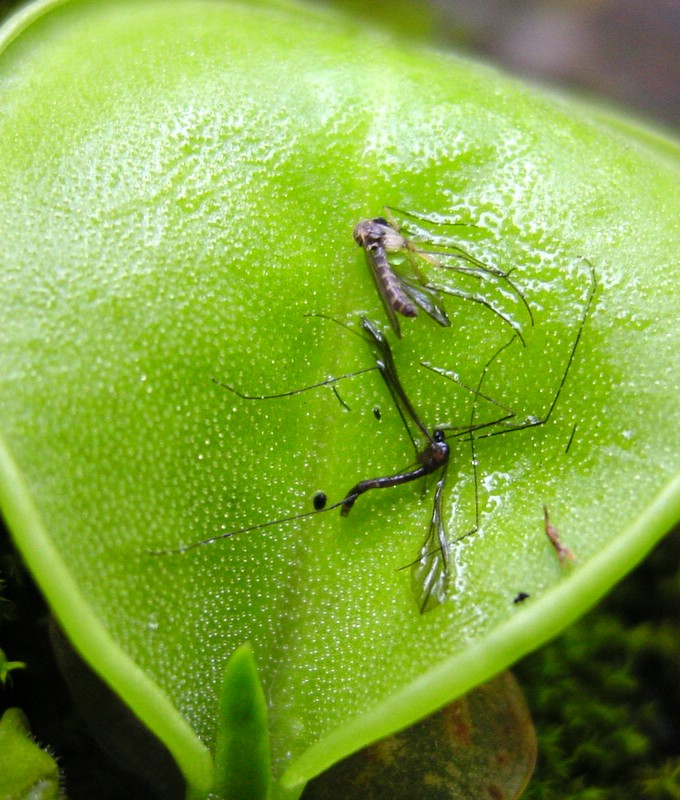
Pinguicula conzattii with prey.

=== Flypaper traps ===
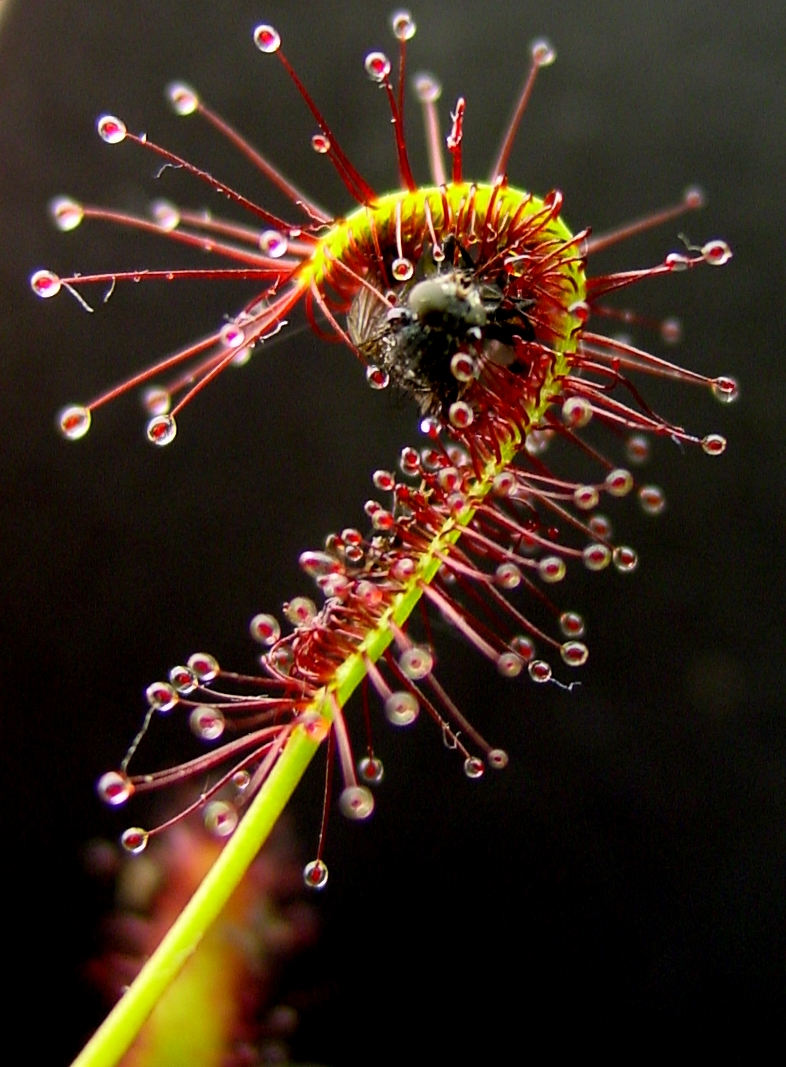
The leaf of a Drosera capensis bending in response to the trapping of an insect

The flypaper trap utilises sticky mucilage or glue. The leaf of flypaper traps is studded with mucilage-secreting glands, which may be short (like those of the butterworts), or long and mobile (like those of many sundews). Flypapers have evolved independently at least five times. There is evidence that some clades of flypaper traps have evolved from morphologically more complex traps such as pitchers.

In the genus Pinguicula, the mucilage glands are quite short (sessile), and the leaf, while shiny (giving the genus its common name of 'butterwort'), does not appear carnivorous. However, this belies the fact that the leaf is an extremely effective trap of small flying insects (such as fungus gnats), and its surface responds to prey by relatively rapid growth. This thigmotropic growth may involve rolling of the leaf blade (to prevent rain from splashing the prey off the leaf surface) or dishing of the surface under the prey to form a shallow digestive pit.

The sundew genus (Drosera) consists of over 100 species of active flypapers whose mucilage glands are borne at the end of long tentacles, which frequently grow fast enough in response to prey (thigmotropism) to aid the trapping process. The tentacles of D. burmanii can bend 180° in a minute or so. Sundews are extremely cosmopolitan and are found on all the continents except the Antarctic mainland. They are most diverse in Australia, the home to the large subgroup of pygmy sundews such as D. pygmaea and to a number of tuberous sundews such as D. peltata, which form tubers that aestivate during the dry summer months. These species are so dependent on insect sources of nitrogen that they generally lack the enzyme nitrate reductase, which most plants require to assimilate soil-borne nitrate into organic forms.

Drosera capensis responding to captured prey. This scene is about 4 hours in real-time.

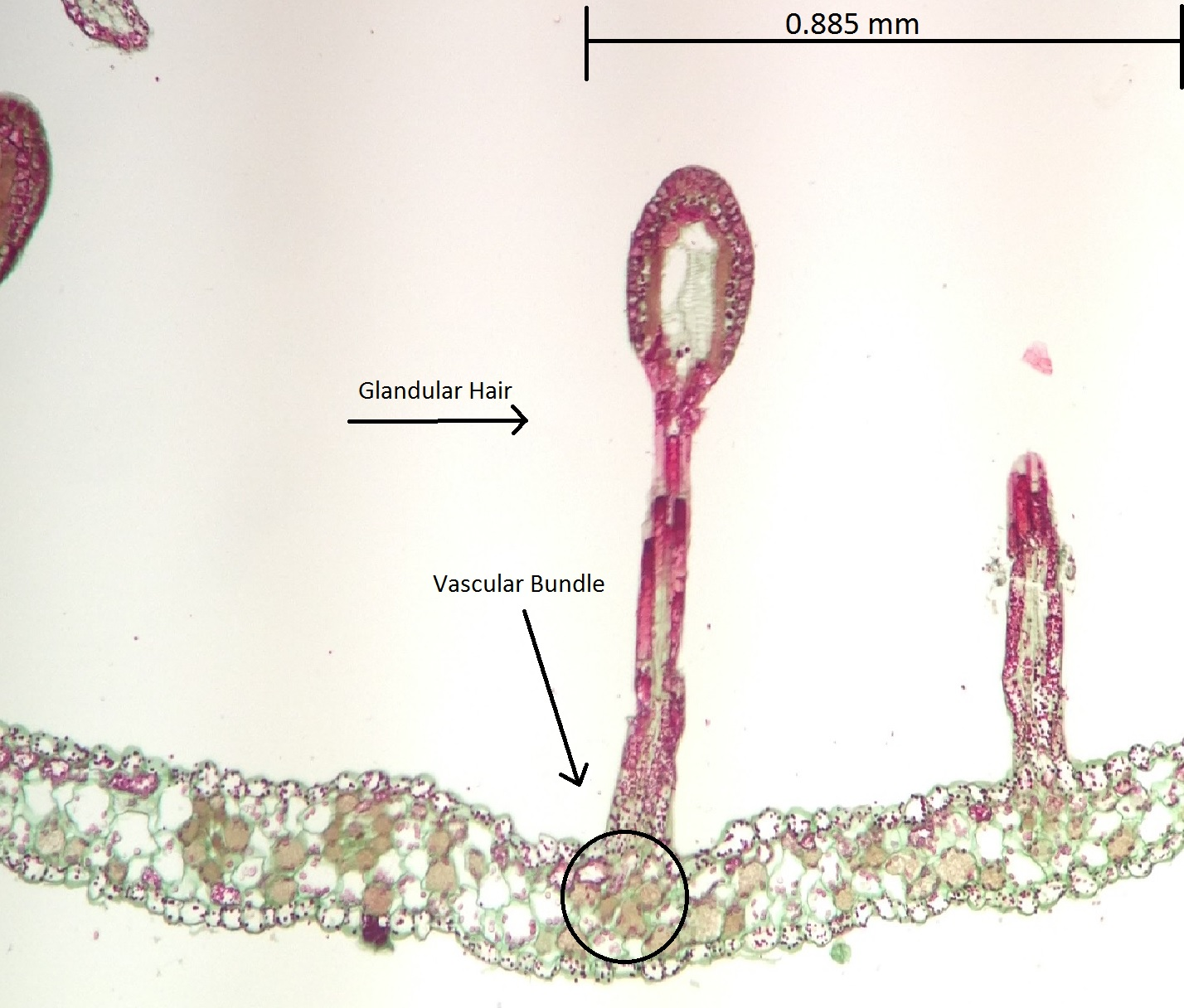
Drosera glandular hair

Similar to Drosera is the Portuguese dewy pine, Drosophyllum, which differs from the sundews in being passive. Its leaves are incapable of rapid movement or growth. Unrelated, but similar in habit, are the Australian rainbow plants (Byblis). Drosophyllum is unusual in that it grows under near-desert conditions; almost all other carnivores are either bog plants or grow in moist tropical areas. Recent molecular data (particularly the production of plumbagin) indicate that the remaining flypaper, Triphyophyllum peltatum, a member of the Dioncophyllaceae, is closely related to Drosophyllum and forms part of a larger clade of carnivorous and non-carnivorous plants with the Droseraceae, Nepenthaceae, Ancistrocladaceae and Plumbaginaceae. This plant is usually encountered as a liana, but in its juvenile phase, the plant is carnivorous. This may be related to a requirement for specific nutrients for flowering.

=== Snap traps ===
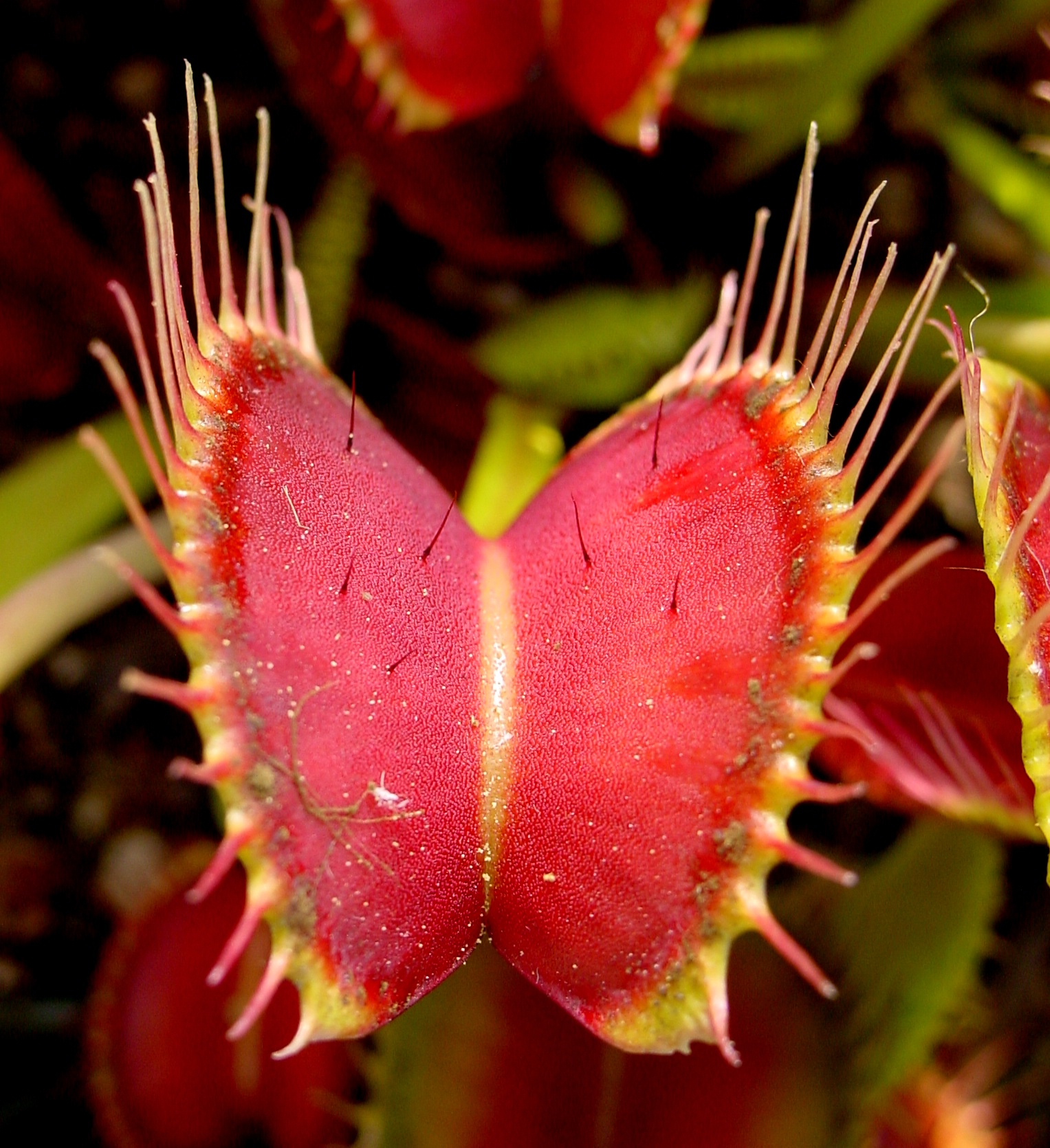
The snap traps of Dionaea muscipula close rapidly when the sensitive hairs on the leaf lobes are triggered.

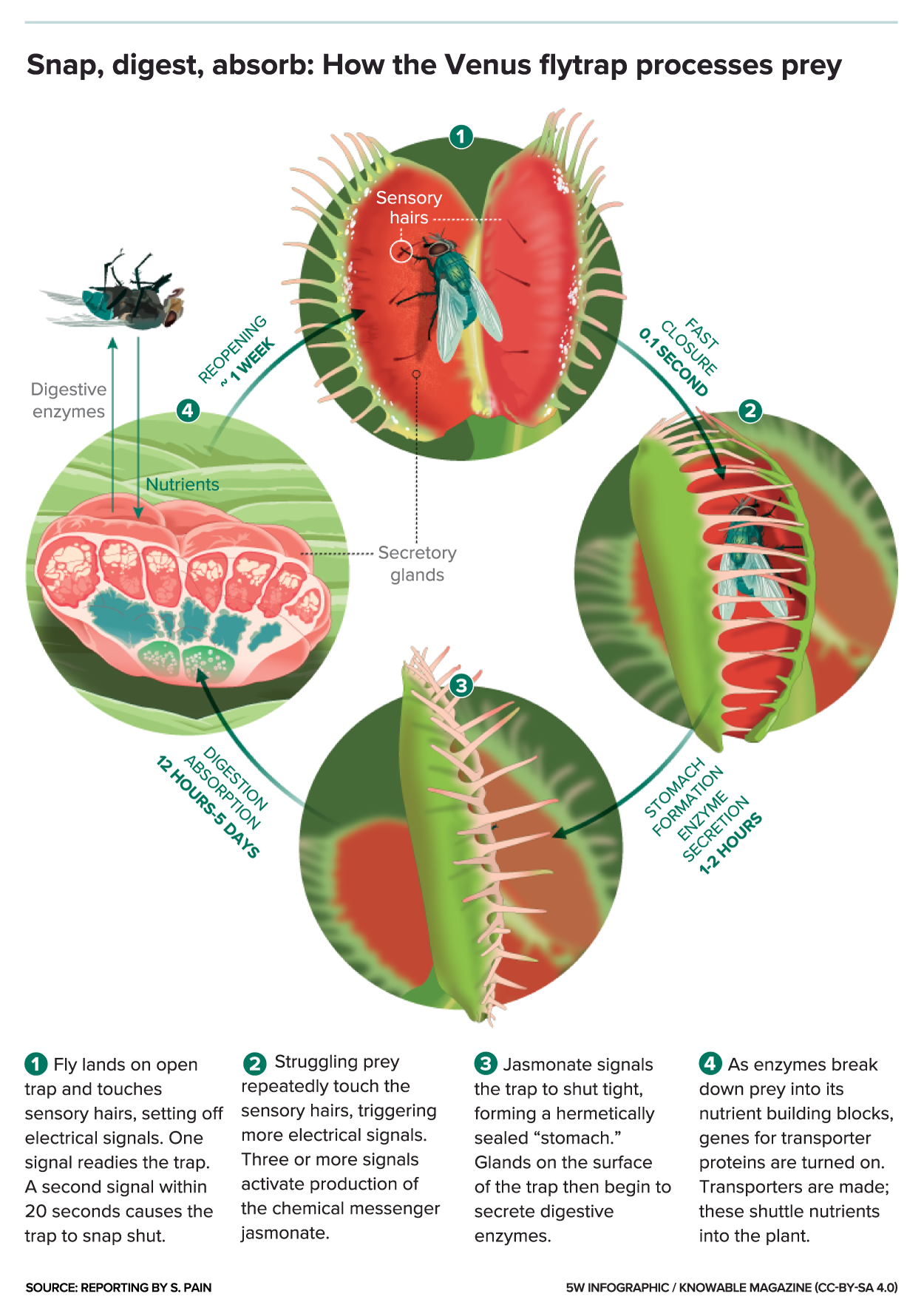
Stages and timing of the Venus flytrap carnivory process, Knowable Magazine

The only two active snap traps—the Venus flytrap (Dionaea muscipula) and the waterwheel plant (Aldrovanda vesiculosa)—had a common ancestor with the snap trap adaptation, which had evolved from an ancestral lineage that utilized flypaper traps. Their trapping mechanism has also been described as a "mouse trap", "bear trap" or "man trap", based on their shape and rapid movement. However, the term snap trap is preferred as other designations are misleading, particularly with respect to the intended prey. Aldrovanda is aquatic and specialized in catching small invertebrates; Dionaea is terrestrial and catches a variety of arthropods, including spiders.

The traps are very similar, with leaves whose terminal section is divided into two lobes, hinged along the midrib. Trigger hairs (three on each lobe in Dionaea muscipula, many more in the case of Aldrovanda) inside the trap lobes are sensitive to touch. When a trigger hair is bent, stretch-gated ion channels in the membranes of cells at the base of the trigger hair open, generating an action potential that propagates to cells in the midrib. These cells respond by pumping out ions, which may either cause water to follow by osmosis (collapsing the cells in the midrib) or cause rapid acid growth. The mechanism is still debated, but in any case, changes in the shape of cells in the midrib allow the lobes, held under tension, to snap shut, flipping rapidly from convex to concave and interring the prey. This whole process takes less than a second. In the Venus flytrap, closure in response to raindrops and blown-in debris is prevented by the leaves having a simple memory: for the lobes to shut, two stimuli are required, 0.5 to 30 seconds apart. According to a recent study, calcium molecules move dynamically within the cells of the plant's leaves when a carnivorous plant touches live prey. Changing calcium levels make leaves move to catch prey, likely by producing more hormones related to defense.

The snapping of the leaves is a case of thigmonasty (undirected movement in response to touch). Further stimulation of the lobe's internal surfaces by the struggling insects causes the lobes to close even tighter (thigmotropism), sealing the lobes hermetically and forming a stomach in which digestion occurs over a period of one to two weeks. Once this process is triggered, it cannot be reversed and requires more stimulation to trigger the next steps. Leaves can be reused three or four times before they become unresponsive to stimulation, depending on the growing conditions.

=== Bladder traps ===
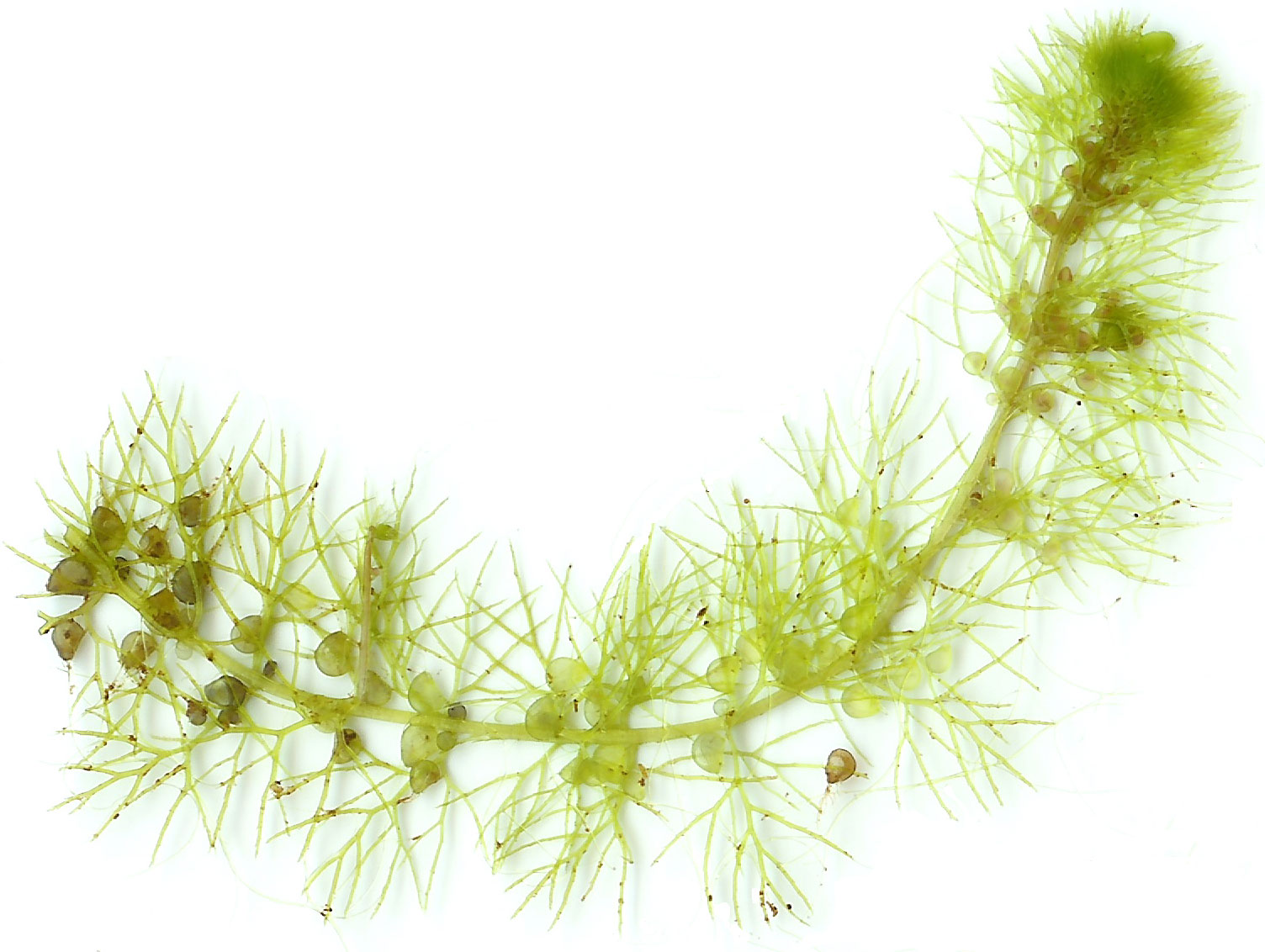
The tip of one stolon of Utricularia vulgaris, showing stolon, branching leaf-shoots, and transparent bladder traps

Bladder traps are exclusive to the genus Utricularia, or bladderworts. The bladders (vesiculae) pump ions out of their interiors. Water follows by osmosis, generating a partial vacuum inside the bladder. The bladder has a small opening, sealed by a hinged door. In aquatic species, the door has a pair of long trigger hairs. Aquatic invertebrates such as Daphnia touch these hairs and deform the door by lever action, releasing the vacuum. The invertebrate is sucked into the bladder, where it is digested. Many species of Utricularia (such as U. sandersonii) are terrestrial, growing in waterlogged soil, and their trapping mechanism is triggered in a slightly different manner. Bladderworts lack roots, but terrestrial species have anchoring stems that resemble roots. Temperate aquatic bladderworts generally die back to a resting turion during the winter months, and U. macrorhiza appears to regulate the number of bladders it bears in response to the prevailing nutrient content of its habitat.

=== Lobster-pot traps ===
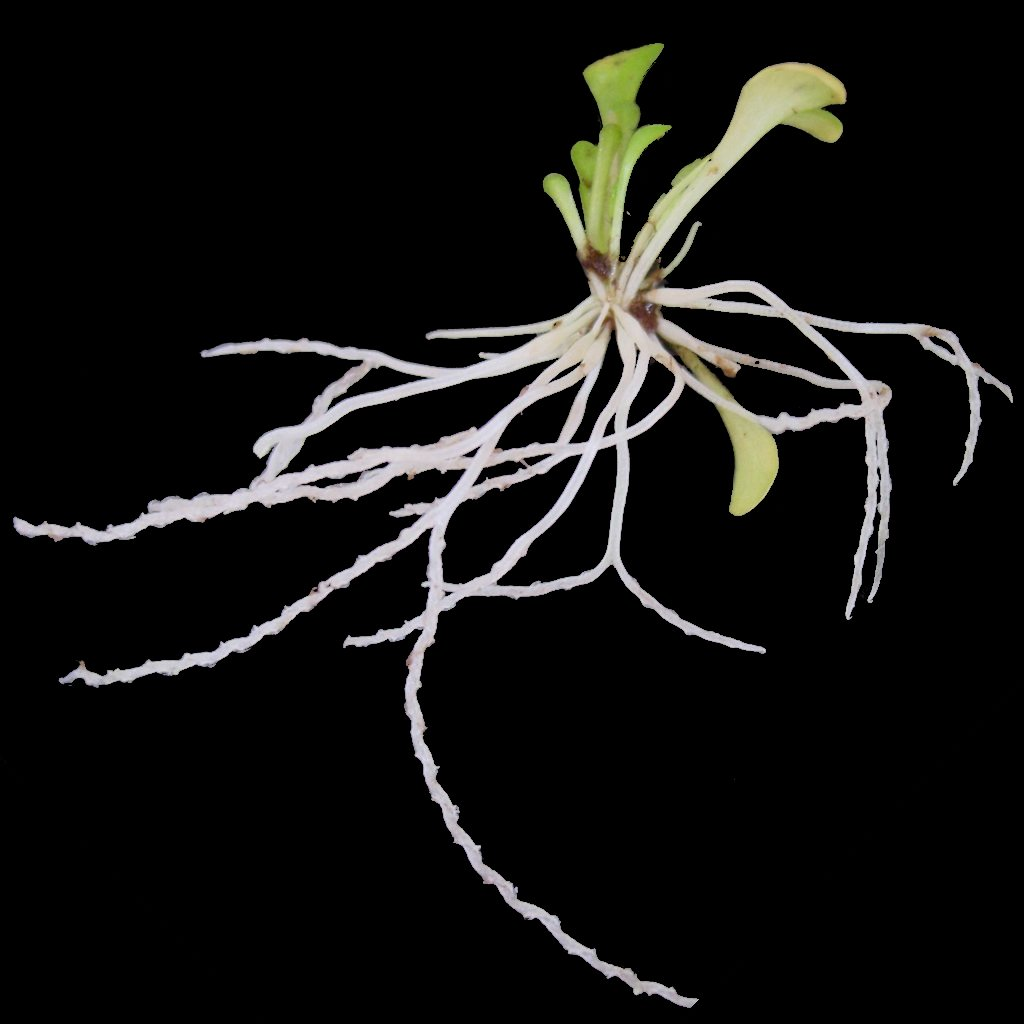
Genlisea violacea traps and leaves

A lobster-pot trap is a chamber that is easy to enter, and whose exit is either difficult to find or obstructed by inward-pointing bristles. Lobster pots are the trapping mechanism in Genlisea, the corkscrew plants. These plants appear to specialise in aquatic protozoa. A Y-shaped modified leaf allows prey to enter but not exit. Inward-pointing hairs force the prey to move in a particular direction. Prey entering the spiral entrance that coils around the upper two arms of the Y are forced to move inexorably towards a stomach in the lower arm of the Y, where they are digested. Prey movement is also thought to be encouraged by water movement through the trap, produced in a similar way to the vacuum in bladder traps, and probably evolutionarily related to it.

Outside of Genlisea, features reminiscent of lobster-pot traps can be seen in Sarracenia psittacina, Darlingtonia californica, and, some horticulturalists argue, Nepenthes aristolochioides.

=== Combination traps ===
The trapping mechanism of the sundew Drosera glanduligera combines features of both flypaper and snap traps; it has been termed a catapult-flypaper trap. Similarly, Nepenthes jamban is a combination of pitfall and flypaper traps because it has a sticky pitcher fluid.

Most Sumatran nepenthes, like N. inermis, also have this method. For example, N. dubia and N. flava also use this method.

=== Borderline carnivores ===
To be defined as carnivorous, a plant must first exhibit an adaptation of some trait specifically for the attraction, capture, or digestion of prey. Only one trait needs to have evolved that fits this adaptive requirement, as many current carnivorous plant genera lack some of the above-mentioned attributes. The second requirement is the ability to absorb nutrients from dead prey and gain a fitness advantage from the integration of these derived nutrients (mostly amino acids and ammonium ions) either through increased growth or pollen and/or seed production. However, plants that may opportunistically utilise nutrients from dead animals without specifically seeking and capturing fauna are excluded from the carnivorous definition. The second requirement also differentiates carnivory from defensive plant characteristics that may kill or incapacitate insects without the advantage of nutrient absorption. Due to the observation that many currently classified carnivores lack digestive enzymes for breaking down nutrients and instead rely upon mutualistic and symbiotic relationships with bacteria, ants, or insects, this adaptation has been added to the carnivorous definition. Despite this, there are cases where plants appear carnivorous, in that they fulfill some of the above definition, but are not truly carnivorous. Some botanists argue that there is a spectrum of carnivory found in plants: from completely non-carnivorous plants like cabbages, to borderline carnivores, to unspecialised and simple traps, like Heliamphora, to extremely specialised and complex traps, like that of the Venus flytrap.

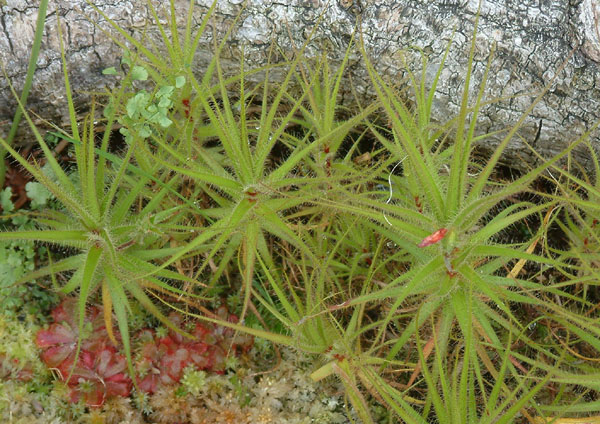
Roridula gorgonias: a borderline carnivore that gains nutrients from its "prey" via the droppings of a predatory bug

A possible carnivore is the genus Roridula; the plants in this genus produce sticky leaves with resin-tipped glands and look extremely similar to some of the larger sundews. However, they do not directly benefit from the insects they catch. Instead, they form a mutualistic symbiosis with species of assassin bug (genus Pameridea), which eat the trapped insects. The plant benefits from the nutrients in the bugs' feces. By some definitions this would still constitute botanical carnivory.

A number of species in the Martyniaceae (previously Pedaliaceae), such as Ibicella lutea, have sticky leaves that trap insects. However, these plants have not been shown conclusively to be carnivorous. Likewise, the seeds of Shepherd's Purse, urns of Paepalanthus bromelioides, bracts of Passiflora foetida, and flower stalks and sepals of triggerplants (Stylidium) appear to trap and kill insects, but their classification as carnivores is contentious.

Two genera of liverwort, Colura and Pleurozia, have sac-shaped leaves that trap and kill ciliates and may digest them.

A species of pitcher plant, Nepenthes ampullaria, has evolved away from being a carnivore. Rather than catching animals, it catches falling leaves in its pitchers.

== Digestion ==
Specialized multicellular secretion glands produce digestive fluid that smother, kill, and digest prey as well as make a solution to assimilate released nutrients. Saccharides are often found in plants that have adhesive traps or plants that use viscous secretion to retain captured prey. The digestion fluid is often nutrient poor and has ions K^{+}, Na^{+}, Ca^{2+} and Mg^{2+} (for species in the Nepenthes genera for example), along with numerous proteins which vary across genera. Peroxidases are also involved for some species. The body of the prey is decomposed by a cocktail of hydrolytic enzymes which are stored in sub-cellular compartments or synthesized over and over as needed.

Proteins of digestive fluid include proteases, chitinases (partly destroy exoskeleton of insects), phosphatases, and nucleases.

== Evolution ==
=== General pattern of independent development in multiple lineages ===
Charles Darwin spent 16 years growing carnivorous plants, experimenting with them in the greenhouse of his home in Kent, Down House. In his pioneering book Insectivorous Plants (1875) Darwin concluded that carnivory in plants was convergent, writing that carnivorous genera Utricularia and Nepenthes were not "at all related to the [carnivorous family] Droseraceae". This remained a subject of debate for over a century. In 1960, Leon Croizat concluded that carnivory was monophyletic, and placed all the carnivorous plants together at the base of the angiosperms. Molecular studies over the past 30 years have led to a wide consensus that Darwin was correct, with studies showing that carnivory evolved at least six times in the angiosperms, and that trap designs such as pitcher traps and flypaper traps are analogous rather than homologous.

Researchers using molecular data have concluded that carnivory evolved independently in the Poales (Brocchinia and Catopsis in the Bromeliaceae), the Caryophyllales (Droseraceae, Nepenthaceae, Drosophyllaceae, Dioncophyllaceae), the Oxalidales (Cephalotus), the Ericales (Sarraceniaceae and Roridulaceae), and twice in the Lamiales (Lentibulariaceae and independently in Byblidaceae). The oldest evolution of an existing carnivory lineage has been dated to 85.6 million years ago, with the most recent being Brocchinia reducta in the Bromeliaceae estimated at only 1.9 mya.

The evolution of carnivorous plants is obscured by the paucity of their fossil record. Very few fossils have been found, and then usually only as seed or pollen. Carnivorous plants are generally herbs, and their traps are produced by primary growth. They generally do not form readily fossilisable structures such as thick bark or wood.

Researchers are increasingly using genome sequencing technology to examine the development of carnivorous species and relationships between them. Genetic evidence suggests that carnivory developed by co-opting and repurposing existing genes which had established functions in flowering plants, rather than by "hijacking" genes from other types of organisms.

=== Adaptation to extreme habitats ===
Most carnivorous plants live in habitats with high light, waterlogged soils, and extremely low soil nitrogen and phosphorus, producing the ecological impetus to derive nitrogen from an alternate source. High-light environments allowed for the trade-off between photosynthetic leaves and photosynthetically inefficient, prey-capturing traps. To compensate for the photosynthetically inefficient material, the nutrients obtained through carnivory would need to increase photosynthesis by investing in more leaf mass (i.e. growth). Consequently, when there is a shortage of nutrients, sufficient light and water, the capture and digestion of prey has the greatest impact on photosynthetic gains, thus favoring the evolution of plant adaptations which allowed for more effective, efficient carnivory.

Due to the required energy and resource allocations for carnivorous adaptations (e.g. the production of lures, digestive enzymes, modified leaf structures, and the decreased rate of photosynthesis over total leaf area), some authors argue that carnivory is an evolutionary "last resort" when nitrogen and phosphorus are extremely limited in an ecosystem.

=== Inferences from trap mechanism ===
Despite meager fossil evidence, much can be deduced from the structure of current traps and their ecological interactions. It is widely believed that carnivory evolved under extremely nutrient-poor conditions, leading to a cost-benefit model for botanical carnivory. Cost-benefit models are used under the assumption that there is a set amount of potential energy available to an organism, which leads to trade-offs wherein energy is allocated to certain functions to maximize competitive ability and fitness. For carnivory, the trait could only evolve if the increase in nutrients from capturing prey exceeded the cost of investment in carnivorous adaptations.

Pitfall traps are derived from rolled leaves, which evolved several independent times through convergent evolution. The vascular tissues of Sarracenia is a case in point. The keel along the front of the trap contains a mixture of leftward- and rightward-facing vascular bundles, as would be predicted from the fusion of the edges of an adaxial (stem-facing) leaf surface. Flypapers also show a simple evolutionary gradient from sticky, non-carnivorous leaves, through passive flypapers to active forms. Molecular data show the Dionaea–Aldrovanda clade is closely related to Drosera, and evolved from active flypaper traps into snap traps.

=== Hypothetical common start with a sticky, hairy leaf ===
It has been suggested that all trap types are modifications of a similar basic structure: the hairy leaf. Hairy (or more specifically, stalked-glandular) leaves can catch and retain drops of rainwater, especially if shield-shaped or peltate, thus promoting bacteria growth. Insects land on the leaf, become mired by the surface tension of the water, and suffocate. Bacteria jumpstart decay, releasing from the corpse nutrients that the plant can absorb through its leaves. This foliar feeding can be observed in most non-carnivorous plants.

Plants that were better at retaining insects or water therefore had a selective advantage. Rainwater can be retained by cupping the leaf, and pitfall traps may have evolved simply by selection pressure for the production of more deeply cupped leaves, followed by "zipping up" of the margins and subsequent loss of most of the hairs. Alternatively, insects can be retained by making the leaf stickier by the production of mucilage, leading to flypaper traps.

The only traps that are unlikely to have descended from a hairy leaf or sepal are the carnivorous bromeliads (Brocchinia and Catopsis): These plants use the urn – a characteristic part of all bromeliads, not just the carnivorous ones – for a new purpose, and build on it by the production of wax and the other paraphernalia of carnivory.

=== Leaves shaped like pitchers and lobster-pots ===
The lobster-pot traps of Genlisea are difficult to interpret. They may have developed from bifurcated pitchers that later specialised on ground-dwelling prey; or, perhaps, the prey-guiding protrusions of bladder traps became more substantial than the net-like funnel found in most aquatic bladderworts. Whatever their origin, the helical shape of the lobster pot is an adaptation that displays as much trapping surface as possible in all directions when buried in moss.

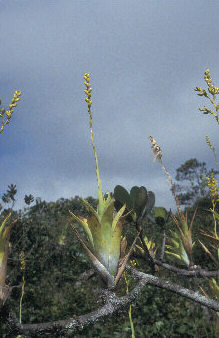
The traps of Catopsis berteroniana are unlikely to have descended from a hairy leaf or sepal.

The traps of the bladderworts may have derived from pitchers that specialised in aquatic prey when flooded, like Sarracenia psittacina does today. Escaping prey in terrestrial pitchers have to climb or fly out of a trap, and both of these can be prevented by wax, gravity and narrow tubes. However, a flooded trap can be swum out of, so in Utricularia, a one-way lid may have developed to form the door of a proto-bladder. Later, this may have become active by the evolution of a partial vacuum inside the bladder, tripped by prey brushing against trigger hairs on the door of the bladder.

The active glue traps use rapid plant movements to trap their prey. Rapid plant movement can result from actual growth, or from rapid changes in cell turgor, which allow cells to expand or contract by quickly altering their water content. Slow-moving flypapers like Pinguicula exploit growth, while the Venus flytrap uses such rapid turgor changes which make glue unnecessary. The stalked glands that once made glue became teeth and trigger hairs in species with active snap traps – an example of natural selection hijacking preexisting structures for new functions.

=== Unclear clustering of carnivory in Caryophyllales ===
Recent taxonomic analysis of the relationships within the Caryophyllales indicate that the Droseraceae, Triphyophyllum, Nepenthaceae and Drosophyllum, while closely related, are embedded within a larger clade that includes non-carnivorous groups such as the tamarisks, Ancistrocladaceae, Polygonaceae and Plumbaginaceae.

The tamarisks possess specialised salt-excreting glands on their leaves, as do several of the Plumbaginaceae (such as the sea lavender, Limonium), which may have been co-opted for the excretion of other chemicals, such as proteases and mucilage. Some of the Plumbaginaceae (e.g. Ceratostigma) also have stalked, vascularised glands that secrete mucilage on their calyces and aid in seed dispersal and possibly in protecting the flowers from crawling parasitic insects. The balsams (such as Impatiens), which are closely related to the Sarraceniaceae and Roridula, similarly possess stalked glands.

Philcoxia is unique in the Plantaginaceae as a result of its subterranean stems and leaves, which have been shown to be used in the capture of nematodes. These plants grow in sand in Brazil, where they are likely to receive other nutrients. Like many other types of carnivorous plant, stalked glands are seen on the leaves. Enzymes on the leaves are used to digest the worms and release their nutrients.

=== Carnivory in angiosperms ===
Botanical carnivory has evolved in several independent families peppered throughout the angiosperm phylogeny, showing that carnivorous traits underwent convergent evolution multiple times to create similar morphologies across disparate families. Results of genetic testing published in 2017 found an example of convergent evolution – a digestive enzyme with the same functional mutations across unrelated lineages.

== Ecology and modeling of carnivory ==
Carnivorous plants are widespread but rather rare. They are almost entirely restricted to habitats such as bogs, where soil nutrients are extremely limiting, but where sunlight and water are readily available. Only under such extreme conditions is carnivory favored to an extent that makes the adaptations advantageous.

The archetypal carnivore, the Venus flytrap, grows in soils with almost immeasurable nitrate and calcium levels. Plants need nitrogen for protein synthesis, calcium for cell wall stiffening, phosphate for nucleic acid synthesis, and iron and magnesium for chlorophyll synthesis. The soil is often waterlogged, which favours the production of toxic ions such as ammonium, and its pH is an acidic 4 to 5. Ammonium can be used as a source of nitrogen by plants, but its high toxicity means that concentrations high enough to fertilise are also high enough to cause damage.

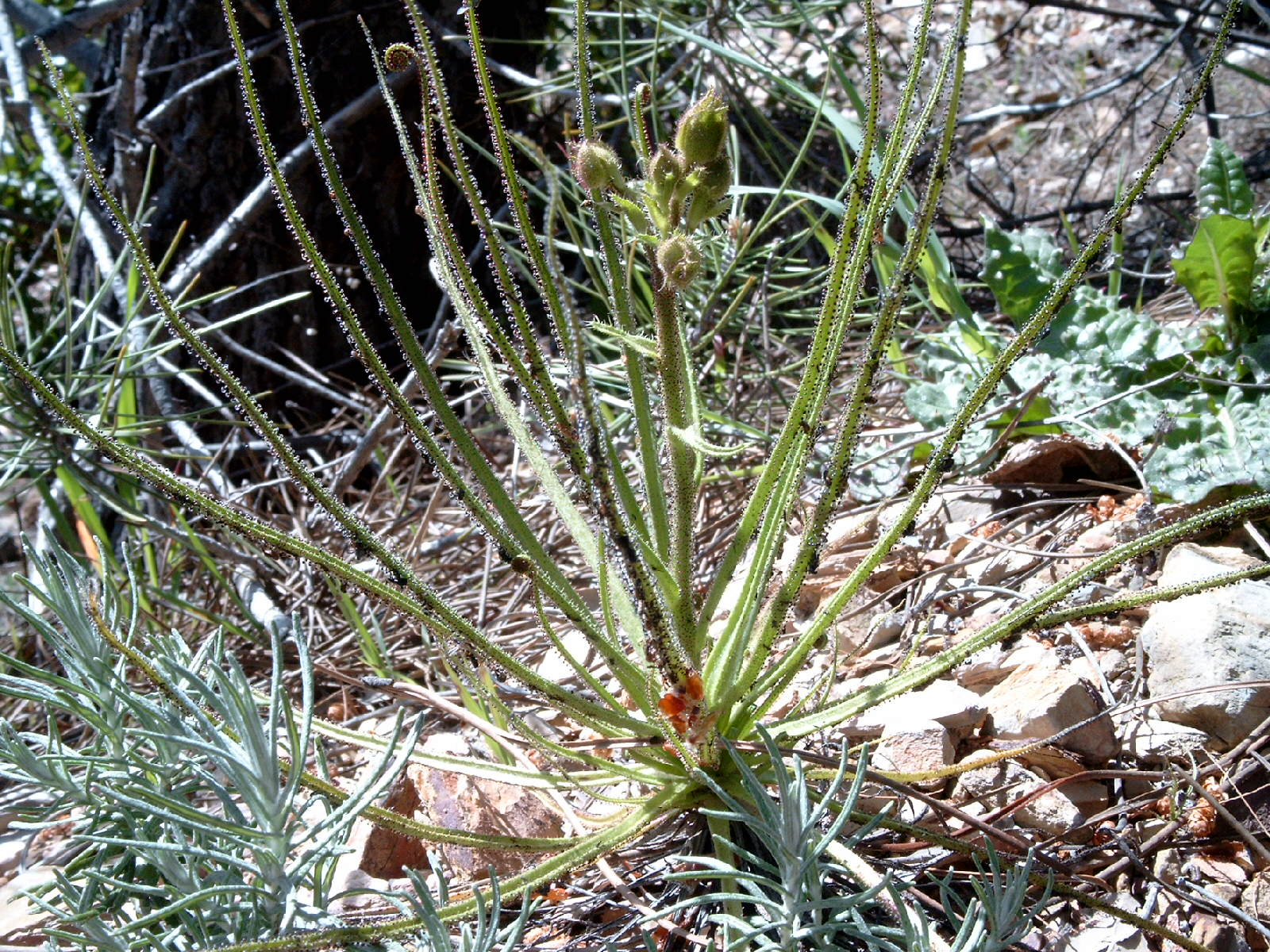
Drosophyllum lusitanicum is one of the few carnivorous plants to grow in dry soil

However, the habitat is warm, sunny, constantly moist, and the plant experiences relatively little competition from low growing Sphagnum moss. Still, carnivores are also found in very atypical habitats. Drosophyllum lusitanicum is found around desert edges and Pinguicula valisneriifolia on limestone (calcium-rich) cliffs.

In all the studied cases, carnivory allows plants to grow and reproduce using animals as a source of nitrogen, phosphorus and possibly potassium. However, there is a spectrum of dependency on animal prey. Pygmy sundews are unable to use nitrate from soil because they lack the necessary enzymes (nitrate reductase in particular). Common butterworts (Pinguicula vulgaris) can use inorganic sources of nitrogen better than organic sources, but a mixture of both is preferred. European bladderworts seem to use both sources equally well. Animal prey makes up for differing deficiencies in soil nutrients.

Plants use their leaves to intercept sunlight. The energy is used to reduce carbon dioxide from the air with electrons from water to make sugars (and other biomass) and a waste product, oxygen, in the process of photosynthesis. Leaves also respire, in a similar way to animals, by burning their biomass to generate chemical energy. This energy is temporarily stored in the form of ATP (adenosine triphosphate), which acts as an energy currency for metabolism in all living things. As a waste product, respiration produces carbon dioxide.

For a plant to grow, it must photosynthesise more than it respires. Otherwise, it will eventually exhaust its biomass and die. The potential for plant growth is net photosynthesis, the total gross gain of biomass by photosynthesis, minus the biomass lost by respiration. Understanding carnivory requires a cost-benefit analysis of these factors.

In carnivorous plants, the leaf is not just used to photosynthesise, but also as a trap. Changing the leaf shape to make it a better trap generally makes it less efficient at photosynthesis. For example, pitchers have to be held upright, so that only their opercula directly intercept light. The plant also has to expend extra energy on non-photosynthetic structures like glands, hairs, glue and digestive enzymes. To produce such structures, the plant requires ATP and respires more of its biomass. Hence, a carnivorous plant will have both decreased photosynthesis and increased respiration, making the potential for growth small and the cost of carnivory high.

Being carnivorous allows the plant to grow better when the soil contains little nitrate or phosphate. In particular, an increased supply of nitrogen and phosphorus makes photosynthesis more efficient, because photosynthesis depends on the plant being able to synthesise very large amounts of the nitrogen-rich enzyme RuBisCO (ribulose-1,5-bis-phosphate carboxylase/oxygenase), the most abundant protein on Earth.

It is intuitively clear that the Venus flytrap is more carnivorous than Triphyophyllum peltatum. The former is a full-time moving snap-trap; the latter is a part-time, non-moving flypaper. The energy "wasted" by the plant in building and fuelling its trap is a suitable measure of the carnivory of the trap.

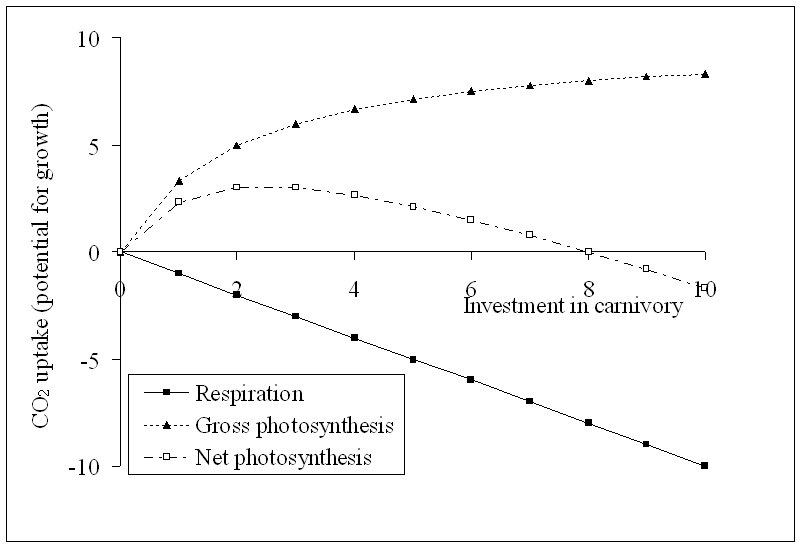
Modelling carnivory in plants: gross photosynthesis, respiration and net photosynthesis as a function of the plant's investment in carnivorous adaptations. Non-zero optimum carnivory occurs in brightly lit habitats with very limiting soil nutrients.

Using this measure of investment in carnivory, a model can be proposed. Above is a graph of carbon dioxide uptake (potential for growth) against trap respiration (investment in carnivory) for a leaf in a sunny habitat containing no soil nutrients at all. Respiration is a straight line sloping down under the horizontal axis (respiration produces carbon dioxide). Gross photosynthesis is a curved line above the horizontal axis: as investment increases, so too does the photosynthesis of the trap, as the leaf receives a better supply of nitrogen and phosphorus. Eventually another factor (such as light intensity or carbon dioxide concentration) will become more limiting to photosynthesis than nitrogen or phosphorus supply. As a result, increasing the investment will not make the plant grow better. The net uptake of carbon dioxide, and therefore, the plant's potential for growth, must be positive for the plant to survive. There is a broad span of investment where this is the case, and there is also a non-zero optimum. Plants investing more or less than this optimum will take up less carbon dioxide than an optimal plant, hence grow less well. These plants will be at a selective disadvantage. At zero investment the growth is zero, because a non-carnivorous plant cannot survive in a habitat with absolutely no soil-borne nutrients. Such habitats do not exist, so for example, Sphagnum absorbs the tiny amounts of nitrates and phosphates in rain very efficiently and also forms symbioses with diazotrophic cyanobacteria.

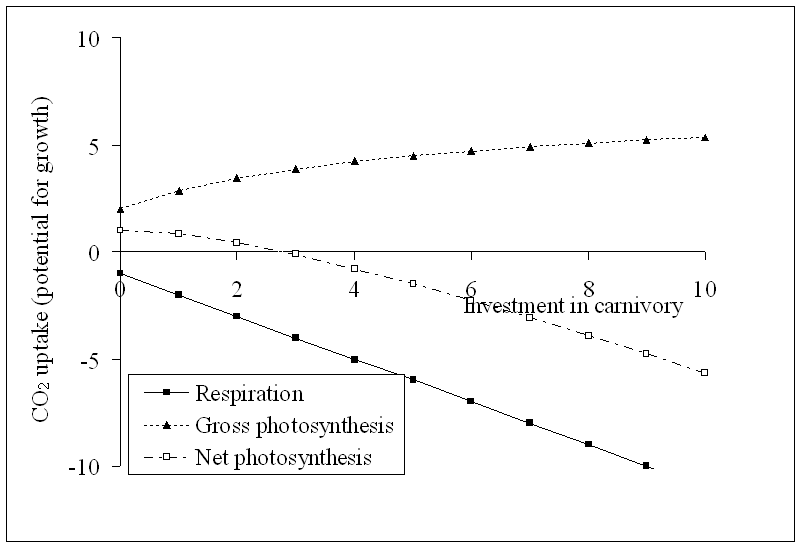
Modelling carnivory in plants: gross photosynthesis, respiration and net photosynthesis as a function of the plant's investment in carnivorous adaptations. An optimum carnivory of zero occurs in poorly lit habitats with abundant soil nutrients.

In a habitat with abundant soil nutrients but little light (as shown above), the gross photosynthesis curve will be lower and flatter, because light will be more limiting than nutrients. A plant can grow at zero investment in carnivory; this is also the optimum investment for a plant, as any investment in traps reduces net photosynthesis (growth) to less than the net photosynthesis of a plant that obtains its nutrients from soil alone.

Carnivorous plants exist between these two extremes: the less limiting light and water are, and the more limiting soil nutrients are, the higher the optimum investment in carnivory, and hence the more obvious the adaptations will be to the casual observer.

The most obvious evidence for this model is that carnivorous plants tend to grow in habitats where water and light are abundant and where competition is relatively low: the typical bog. Those that do not tend to be even more fastidious in some other way. Drosophyllum lusitanicum grows where there is little water, but it is even more extreme in its requirement for bright light and low disturbance than most other carnivores. Pinguicula valisneriifolia grows in soils with high levels of calcium but requires strong illumination and lower competition than many butterworts.

In general, carnivorous plants are poor competitors, because they invest too heavily in structures that have no selective advantage in nutrient-rich habitats. They succeed only where other plants fail. Carnivores are to nutrients what cacti are to water. Carnivory only pays off when the nutrient stress is high and where light is abundant. When these conditions are not met, some plants give up carnivory temporarily. Sarracenia spp. produce flat, non-carnivorous leaves (phyllodes) in winter. Light levels are lower than in summer, so light is more limiting than nutrients, and carnivory does not pay. The lack of insects in winter exacerbates the problem. Damage to growing pitcher leaves prevents them from forming proper pitchers, and again, the plant produces a phyllode instead.

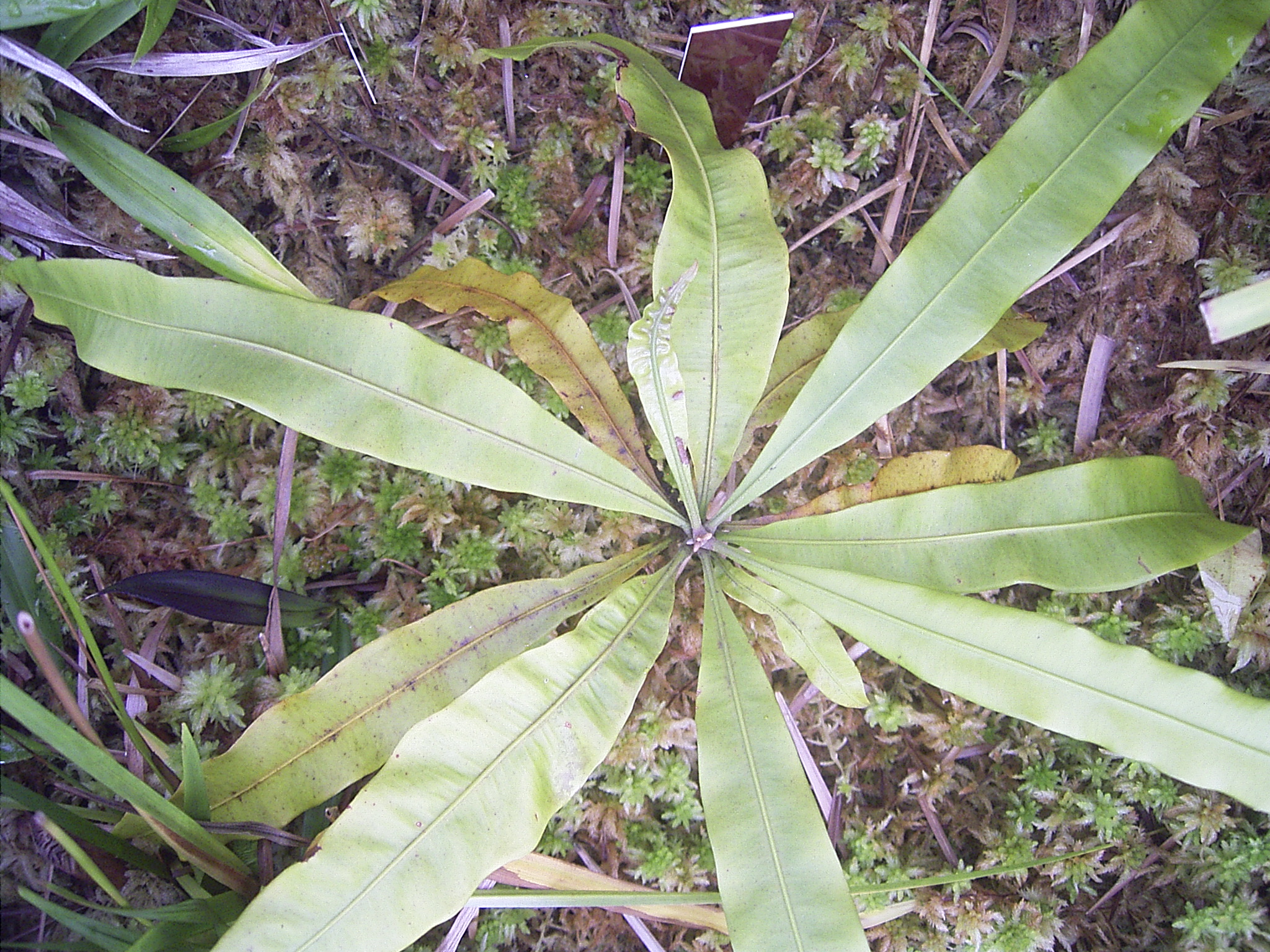
Part-time carnivory in Triphyophyllum peltatum may be due to an unusually high need for potassium at a certain point in the life cycle, just before flowering.

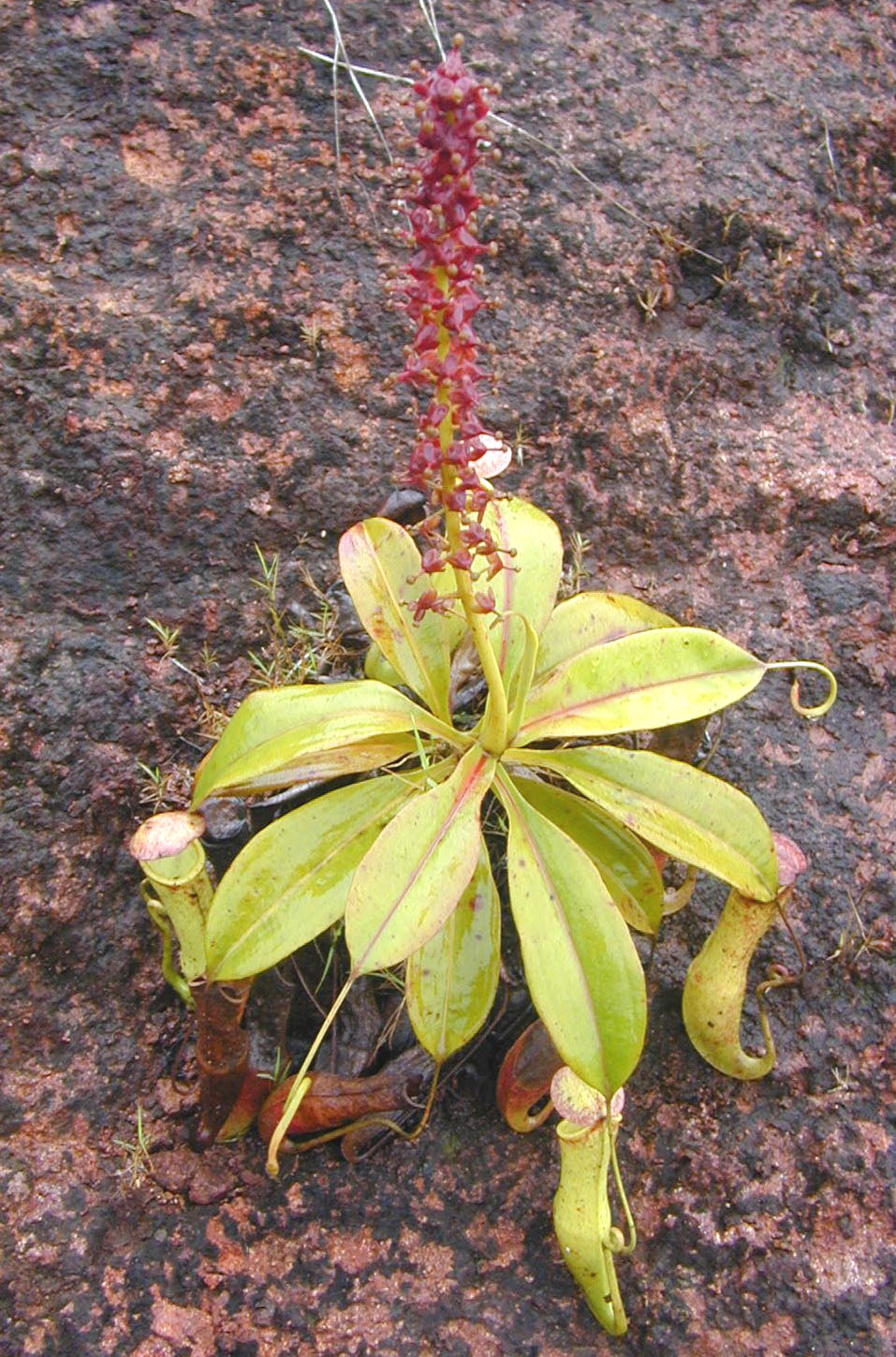
Nepenthes mirabilis in a road cut in Palau. Showing habit and habitat.

Many other carnivores shut down in some seasons. Tuberous sundews die back to tubers in the dry season, bladderworts to turions in winter, and non-carnivorous leaves are made by most butterworts and Cephalotus in the less favourable seasons. Utricularia macrorhiza varies the number of bladders it produces based on the expected density of prey. Part-time carnivory in Triphyophyllum peltatum may be due to an unusually high need for potassium at a certain point in the life cycle, just before flowering.

The more carnivorous a plant is, the less conventional its habitat is likely to be. Venus flytraps live in a very specialised habitat, whereas less carnivorous plants (Byblis, Pinguicula) are found in less unusual habitats (i.e., those typical for non-carnivores). Byblis and Drosophyllum both come from relatively arid regions and are both passive flypapers, arguably the lowest maintenance form of trap. Venus flytraps filter their prey using the teeth around the trap's edge, so as not to waste energy on hard-to-digest prey. In evolution, laziness pays, because energy can be used for reproduction, and short-term benefits in reproduction will outweigh long-term benefits in anything else.

Carnivory rarely pays, so even carnivorous plants avoid it when there is too little light or an easier source of nutrients, and they use as few carnivorous features as are required at a given time or for a given prey item. There are very few habitats stressful enough to make investing biomass and energy in trigger hairs and enzymes worthwhile. Many plants occasionally benefit from animal protein rotting on their leaves, but carnivory that is obvious enough for the casual observer to notice is rare.

Bromeliads seem very well preadapted to carnivory, but only one or two species can be classified as truly carnivorous. By their very shape, bromeliads will benefit from increased prey-derived nutrient input. In this sense, bromeliads are probably carnivorous, but their habitats are too dark for more extreme, recognisable carnivory to evolve. Most bromeliads are epiphytes, and most epiphytes grow in partial shade on tree branches. Brocchinia reducta, on the other hand, is a ground dweller.

Many carnivorous plants are not strongly competitive and rely on circumstances to suppress dominating vegetation. Accordingly, some of them rely on fire ecology for their continued survival.

For the most part carnivorous plant populations are not dominant enough to be dramatically significant, ecologically speaking, but there is an impressive variety of organisms that interact with various carnivorous plants in sundry relationships of kleptoparasitism, commensalism, and mutualism. For example, small insectivores such as tree frogs often exploit the supply of prey to be found in pitcher plants, and the frog Microhyla nepenthicola actually specialises in such habitats. Certain crab spiders such as Henriksenia nepenthicola and H. labuanica live largely on the prey of Nepenthes, and other, less specialised, spiders may build webs where they trap insects attracted by the smell or appearance of the traps; some scavengers, detritivores, and also organisms that harvest or exploit those in turn, such as the mosquito Wyeomyia smithii are largely or totally dependent on particular carnivorous plants. Plants such as Roridula species combine with specialised bugs (Pameridea roridulae) in benefiting from insects trapped on their leaves.

Associations with species of pitcher plants are so many and varied that the study of Nepenthes infauna is something of a discipline in its own right. Camponotus schmitzi, the diving ant, has an intimate degree of mutualism with the pitcher plant Nepenthes bicalcarata; it not only retrieves prey and detritus from beneath the surface of the liquid in the pitchers, but repels herbivores, and cleans the pitcher peristome, maintaining its slippery nature. The ants have been reported to attack struggling prey, hindering their escape, so there might be an element of myrmecotrophy to the relationship. Numerous species of mosquitoes lay their eggs in the liquid, where their larvae play various roles, depending on species; some eat microbes and detritus, as is common among mosquito larvae, whereas some species of Toxorhynchites also breed in pitchers, and their larvae are predators of other species of mosquito larvae. Apart from the crab spiders on pitchers, an actual small, red crab Geosesarma malayanum will enter the fluid, robbing and scavenging, though reputedly it does so at some risk of being captured and digested itself.

Nepenthes rajah has a remarkable mutualism with two unrelated small mammals, the mountain treeshrew (Tupaia montana) and the summit rat (Rattus baluensis). The tree shrews and the rats defecate into the plant's traps while visiting them to feed on sweet, fruity secretions from glands on the pitcher lids. The tree shrew also has a similar relationship with at least two other giant species of Nepenthes. More subtly, Hardwicke's woolly bat (Kerivoula hardwickii), a small species, roosts beneath the operculum (lid) of Nepenthes hemsleyana. The bat's excretions that land in the pitcher pay for the shelter, as it were. To the plant the excreta are more readily assimilable than intact insects would be.

There also is a considerable list of Nepenthes endophytes; these are microbes other than pathogens that live in the tissues of pitcher plants, often apparently harmlessly.

Another important area of symbiosis between carnivorous plants and insects is pollination. While many species of carnivorous plant can reproduce asexually via self-pollination or vegetative propagation, many carnivorous plants are insect-pollinated. Outcross pollination is beneficial as it increases genetic diversity. This means that carnivorous plants undergo an evolutionary and ecological conflict often called the pollinator-prey conflict. There are several ways by which carnivorous plants reduce the strain of the pollinator-prey conflict. For long-lived plants, the short-term loss of reproduction may be offset by the future growth made possible by resources obtained from prey. Other plants might "target" different species of insect for pollination and prey using different olfactory and visual cues.

== Conservation threats ==
Approximately half of the plant species assessed by the IUCN are considered threatened (vulnerable, endangered or critically endangered). Common threats are habitat loss as a result of agriculture, collection of wild plants, pollution, invasive species, residential and commercial development, energy production, mining, transportation services, geologic events, climate change, severe weather, and many other anthropogenic activities. Species in the same genus were proven to face similar threats. Threat by continent is deemed highly variable, with threats found for 19 species in North America, 15 species in Asia, seven species in Europe, six species in South America, two species in Africa, and one species in Australia Indicator species' such as Sarracenia reveal positive associations with regard to these threats. Certain threats are also positively correlated themselves, with residential and commercial development, natural systems modifications, invasive species, and pollution having positive associations. Conservation research is aiming to further quantify the effects of threats, such as pollution, on carnivorous plants, as well as to quantify the extinction risks. Only 17% of species had been assessed as of 2011, according to the IUCN. Carnivorous plant conservation will help maintain important ecosystems and prevent secondary extinctions of specialist species that rely on them such as foundation species which may seek refuge or rely on certain plants for their existence. Research suggests a holistic approach, targeted at the habitat-level of carnivorous plants, may be required for successful conservation.

== Classification ==
The classification of all flowering plants is currently in a state of flux. In the Cronquist system, the Droseraceae and Nepenthaceae were placed in the order Nepenthales, based on the radial symmetry of their flowers and their possession of insect traps. The Sarraceniaceae was placed either in the Nepenthales, or in its own order, the Sarraceniales. The Byblidaceae, Cephalotaceae, and Roridulaceae were placed in the Saxifragales; and the Lentibulariaceae in the Scrophulariales (now subsumed into the Lamiales).

In more modern classification, such as that of the Angiosperm Phylogeny Group, the families have been retained, but they have been redistributed amongst several disparate orders. It is also recommended that Drosophyllum be considered in a monotypic family outside the rest of the Droseraceae, probably more closely allied to the Dioncophyllaceae. The current recommendations are shown below (only carnivorous genera are listed):

=== Dicots ===
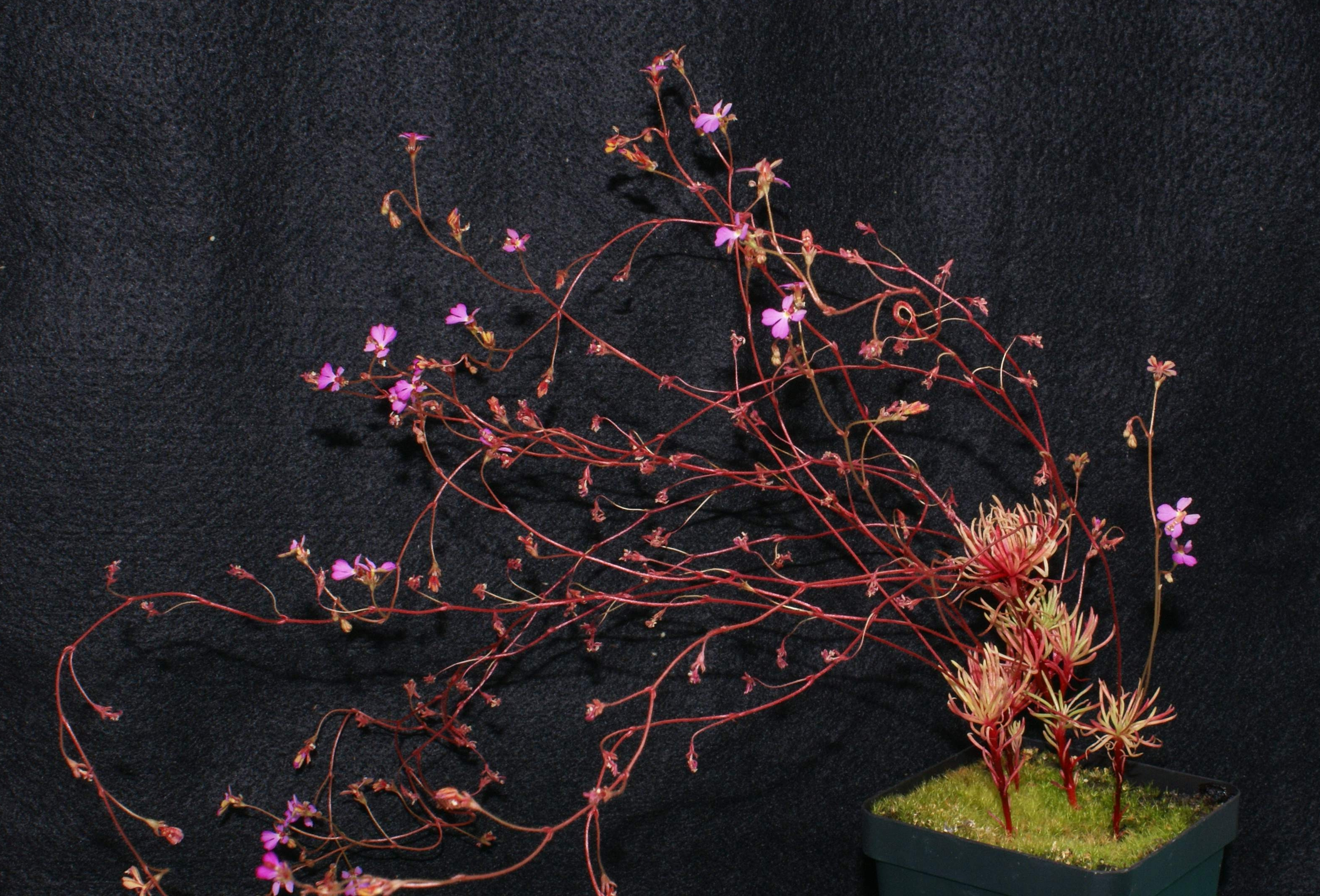
Stylidium turbinatum

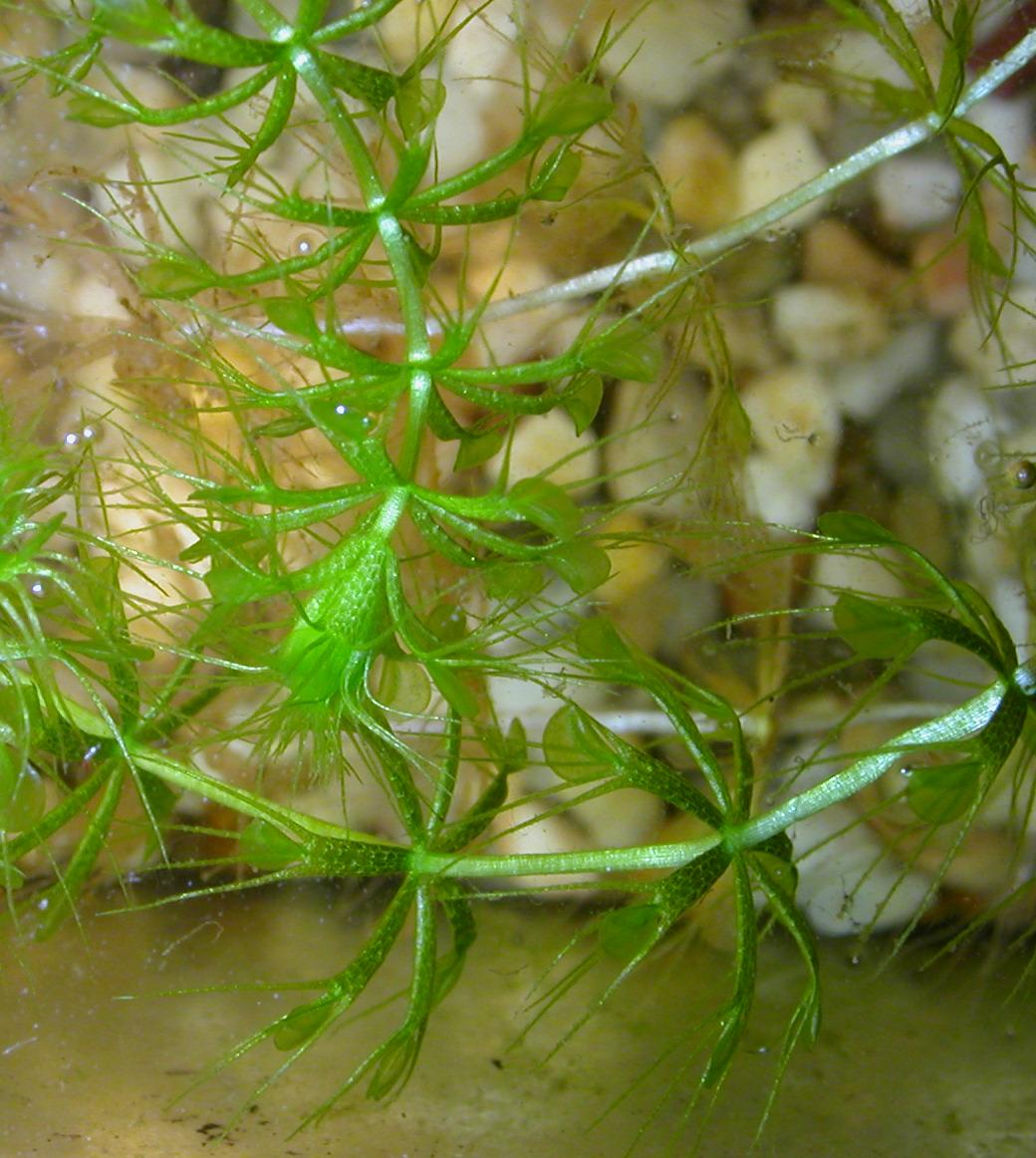
Aldrovanda vesiculosa

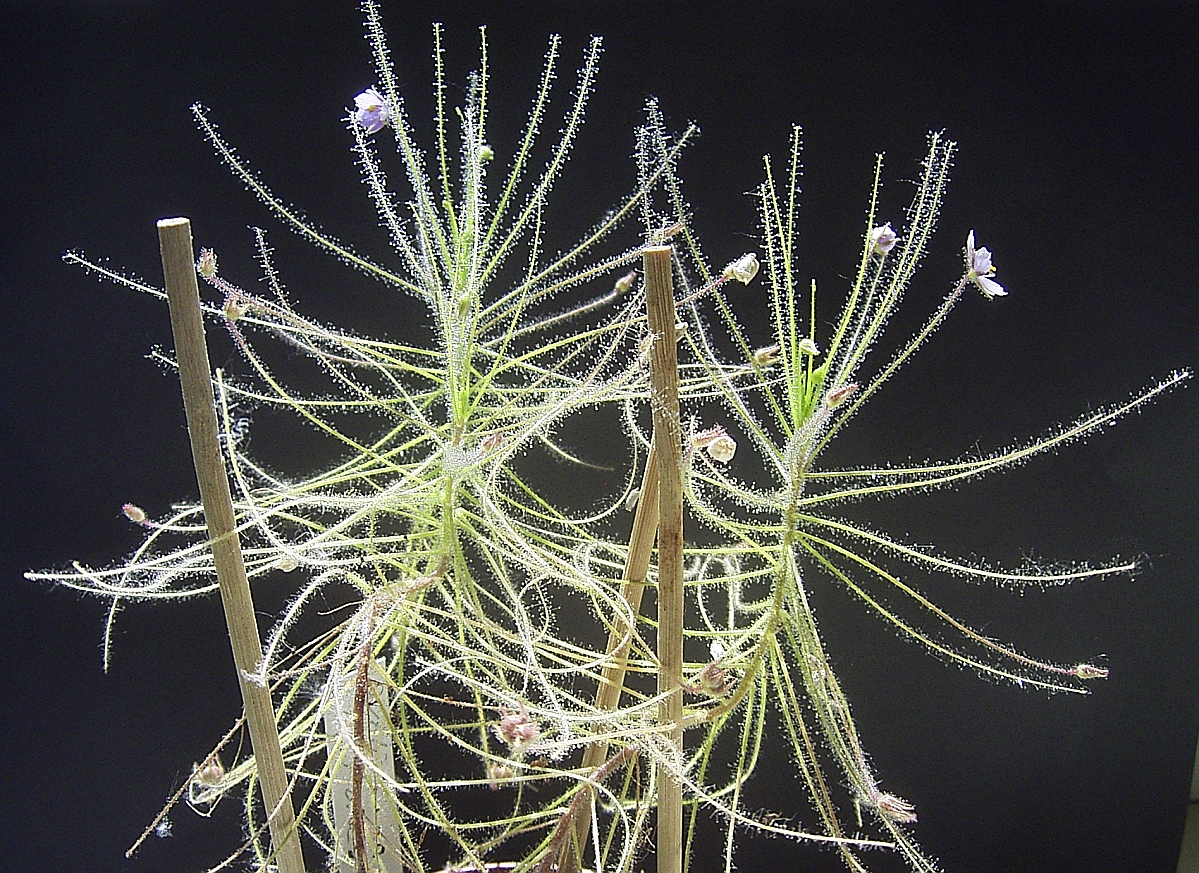
Byblis liniflora

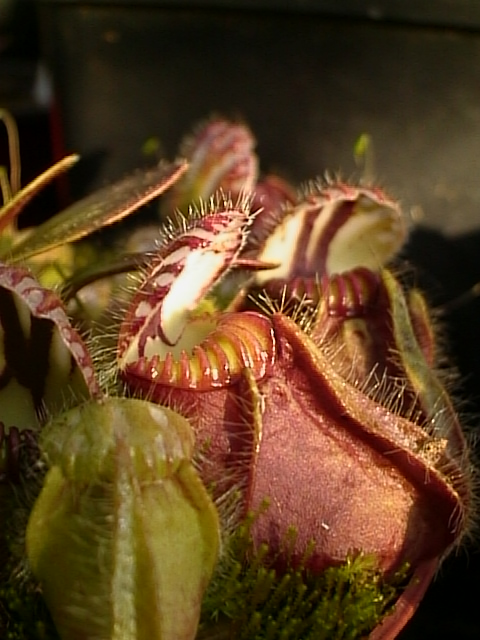
Cephalotus follicularis

- Asterales (sunflower and daisy order)
  - Stylidiaceae
    - Stylidium (trigger plants, a borderline carnivore)
- Caryophyllales, (carnation order)
  - Dioncophyllaceae
    - Triphyophyllum (a tropical liana)
  - Drosophyllaceae
    - Drosophyllum (Portuguese dewy pine)
  - Droseraceae (sundew family)
    - Aldrovanda (waterwheel plant)
    - Dionaea (Venus flytrap)
    - Drosera (sundews)
    - †Droserapollis
    - †Droserapites
    - †Droseridites
    - †Fischeripollis
    - †Saxonipollis
  - Nepenthaceae (tropical pitcher-plant family)
    - Nepenthes (tropical pitcher plants or monkey-cups, including Anurosperma)
- Ericales (heather order)
  - Roridulaceae
    - Roridula (a borderline carnivore)
  - Sarraceniaceae (trumpet pitcher family)
    - Sarracenia (North American trumpet pitchers)
    - Darlingtonia (cobra plant/lily)
    - Heliamphora (sun or marsh pitchers)
- Lamiales (mint order)
  - Byblidaceae
    - Byblis (rainbow plants)
  - Lentibulariaceae (bladderwort family)
    - Pinguicula (butterworts)
    - Genlisea (corkscrew plant)
    - Utricularia (bladderworts, including Polypompholyx, the fairy aprons or pink petticoats and Biovularia an obsolete genus)
  - Martyniaceae (all borderline carnivores, related to the sesame plant)
    - Ibicella
  - Plantaginaceae (plantain family)
    - Philcoxia (recently identified carnivorous genus feeding on nematodes).
- Oxalidales (wood sorrel order)
  - Cephalotus (Albany pitcher plant)

=== Monocots ===
- Alismatales (water plantain order)
  - Tofieldiaceae
    - Triantha occidentalis
- Poales (grass order)
  - Bromeliaceae (bromeliad or pineapple family)
    - Brocchinia (a terrestrial bromeliad)
    - Catopsis (a borderline carnivore)
  - Eriocaulaceae (pipewort family)
    - Paepalanthus bromelioides (a borderline carnivore)

== Gallery of prey ==
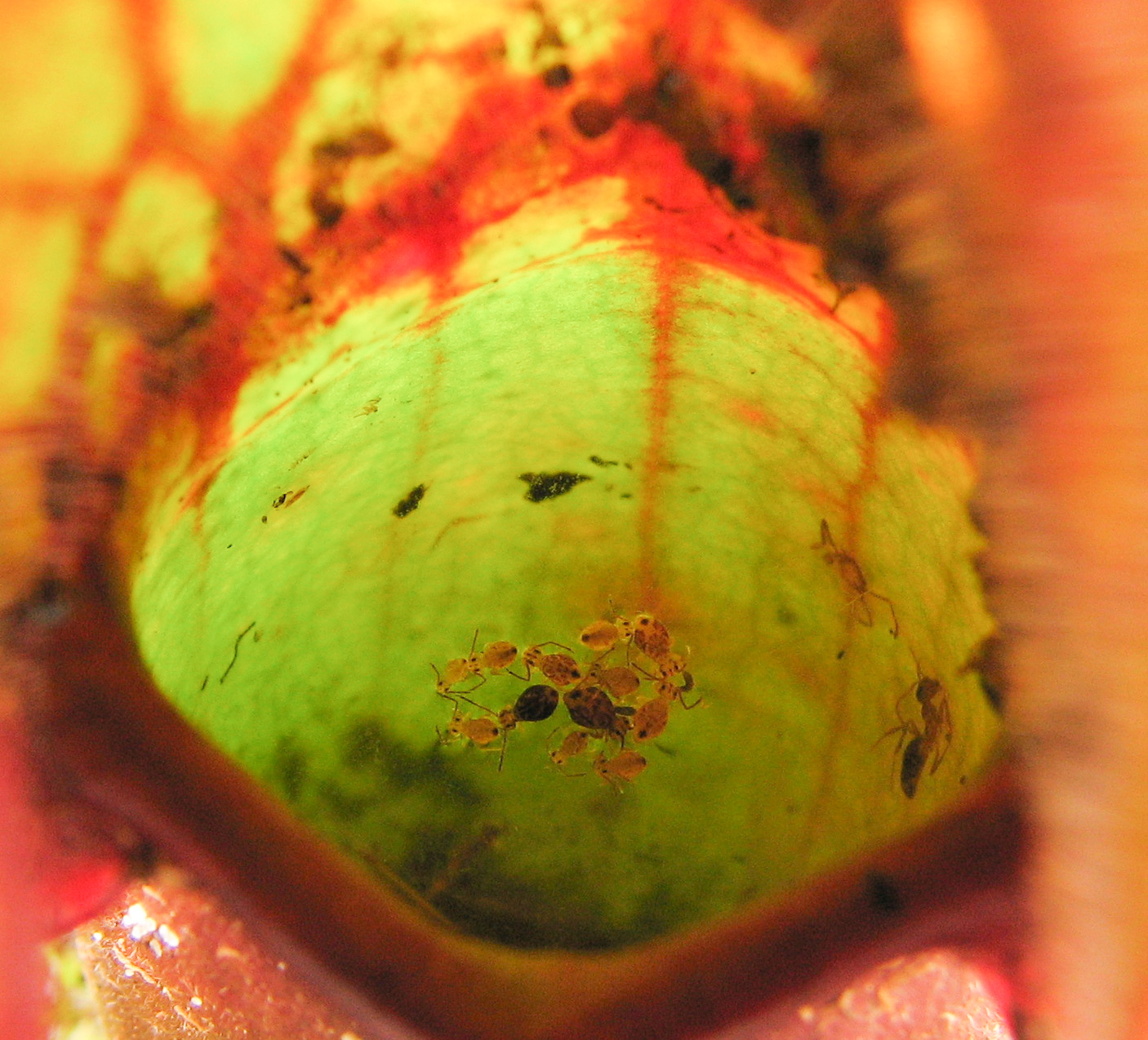
Collembola (Dicyrtomina minuta) trapped inside a leaf of Sarracenia purpurea

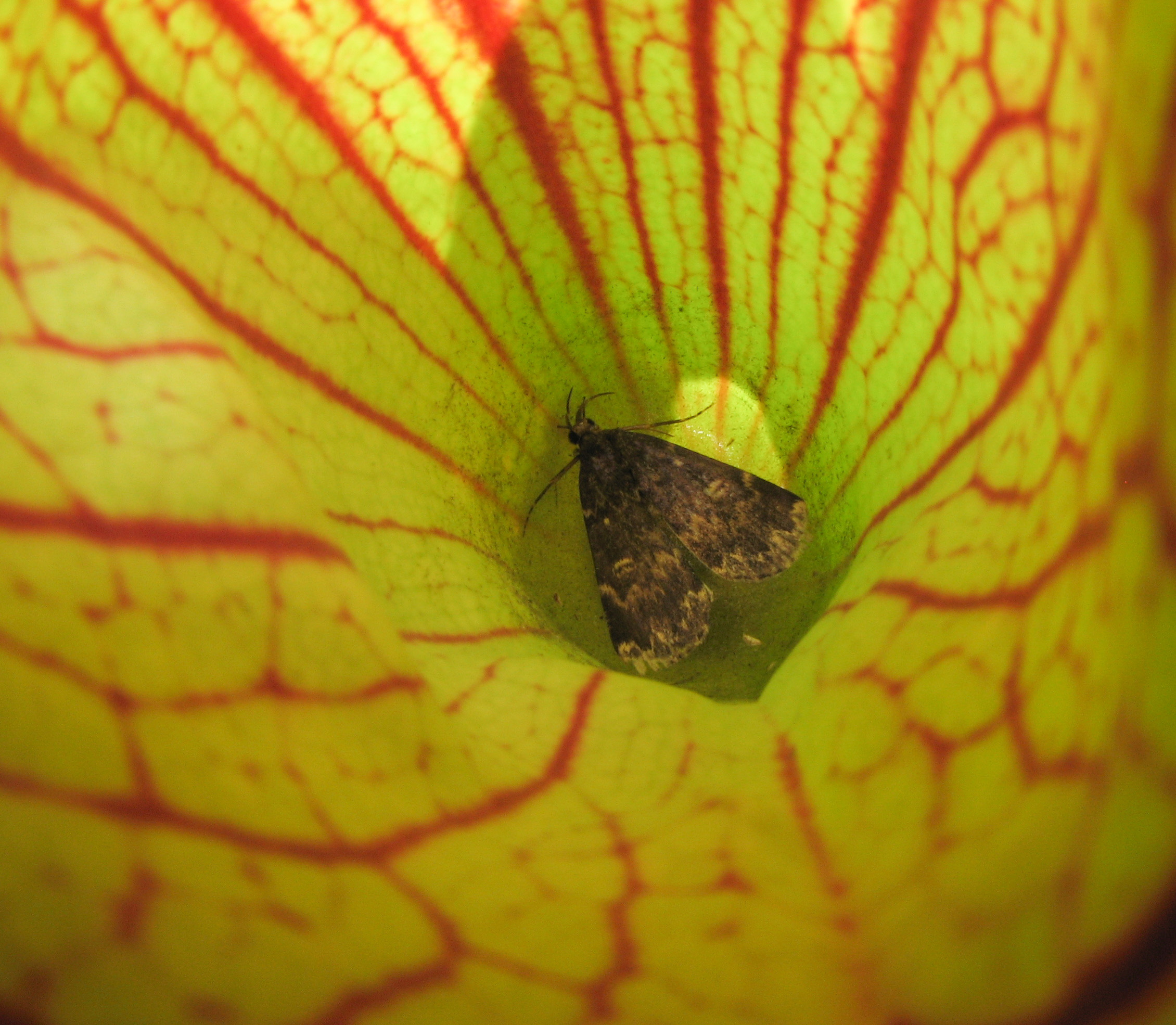
Glossy Black Idia (Idia lubricalis) moth trapped by Sarracenia purpurea

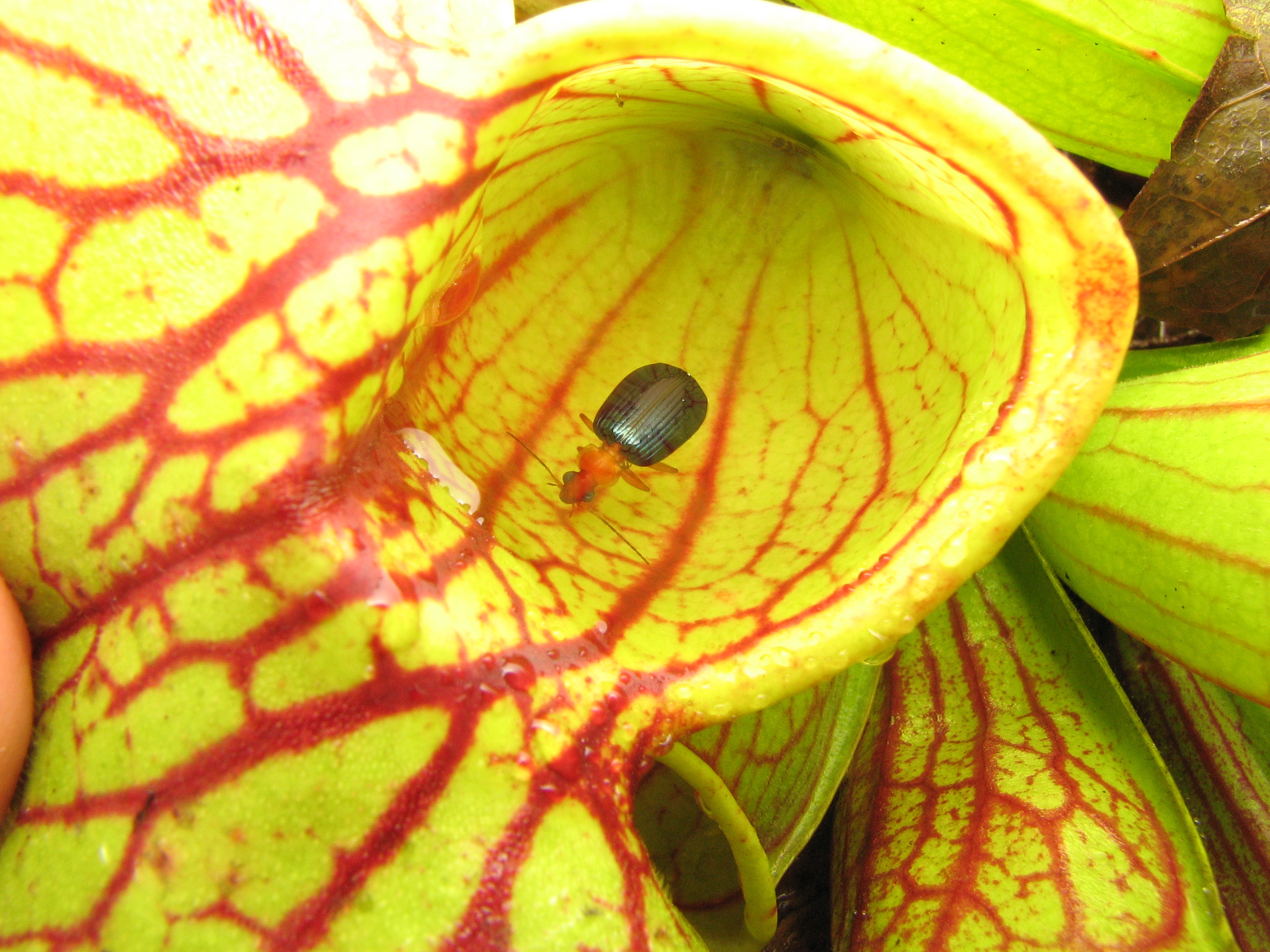
Carabid beetle (Lebia grandis) trapped by Sarracenia purpurea

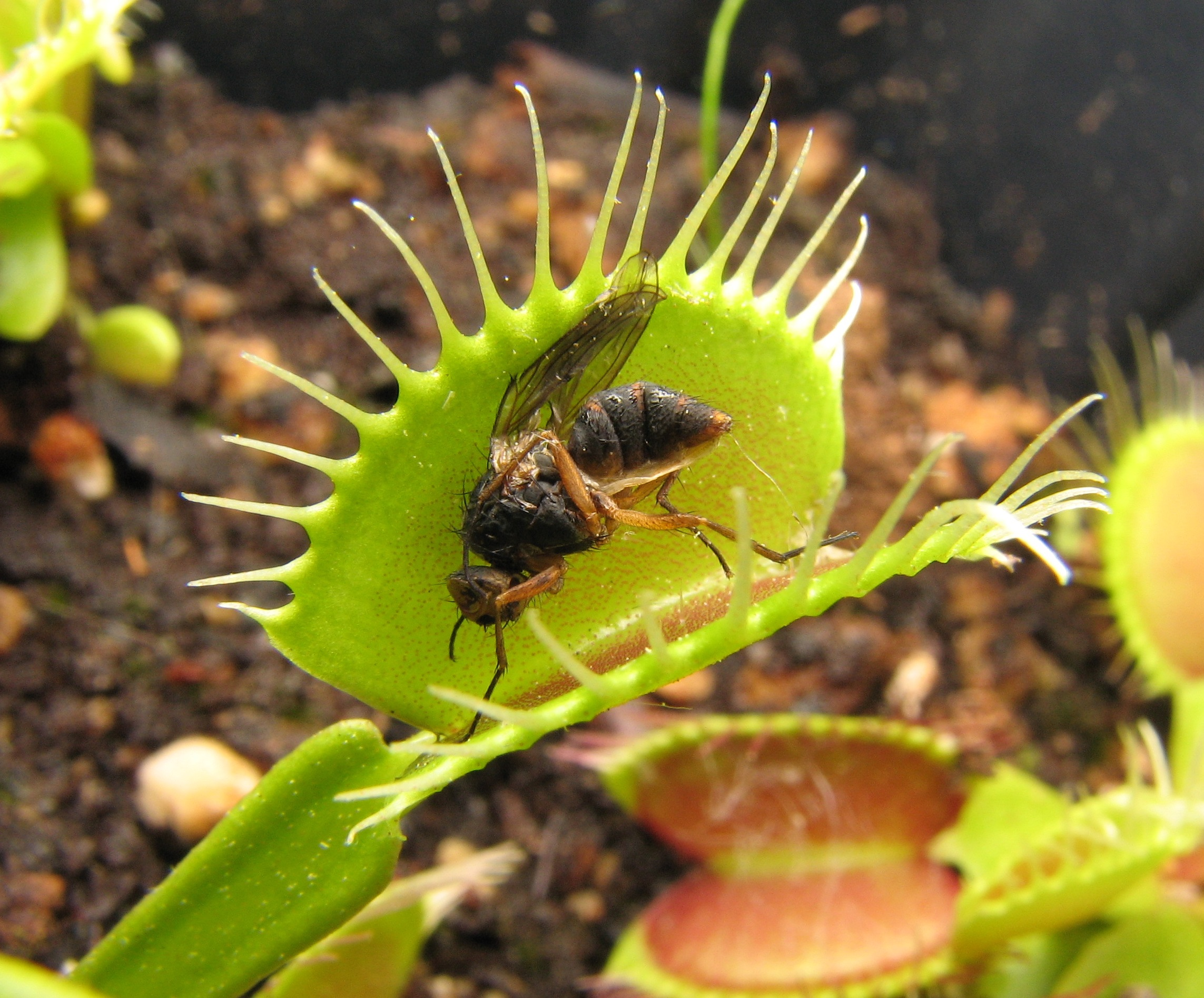
Muscoid fly trapped by Dionaea muscipula

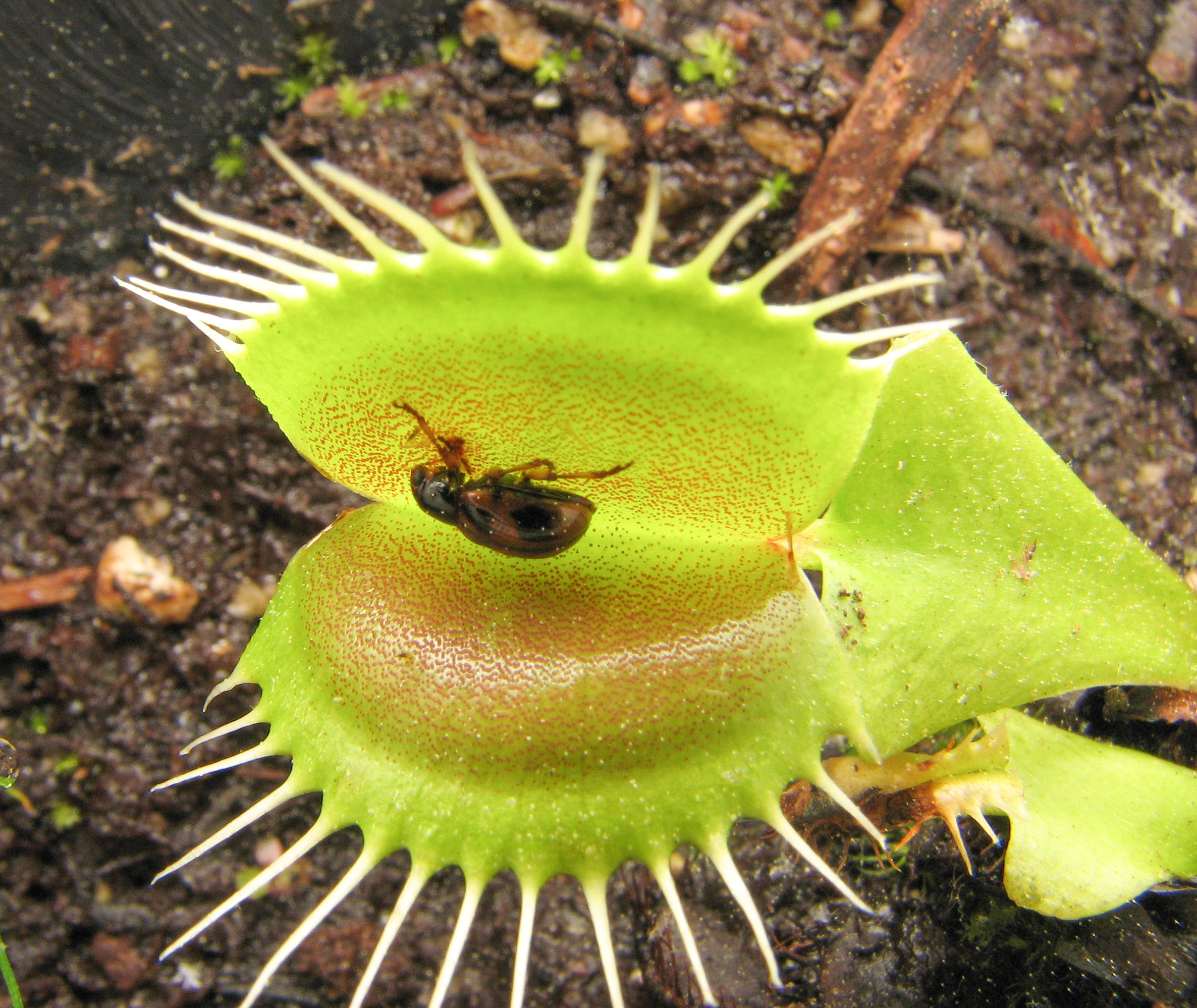
Leaf beetle (Paria) trapped by Dionaea muscipula

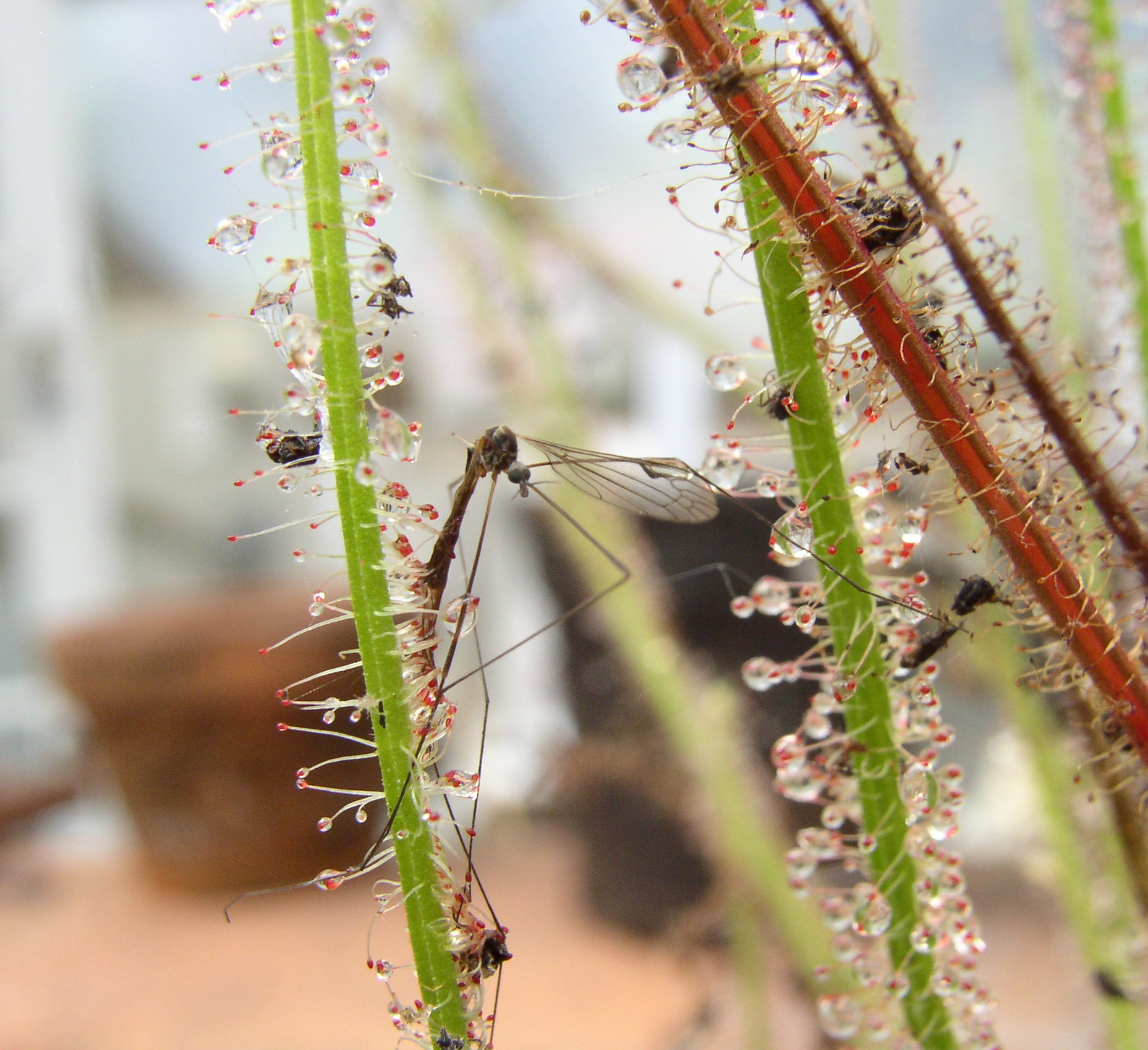
Limoniid cranefly (Limonia) trapped by Drosera filiformis

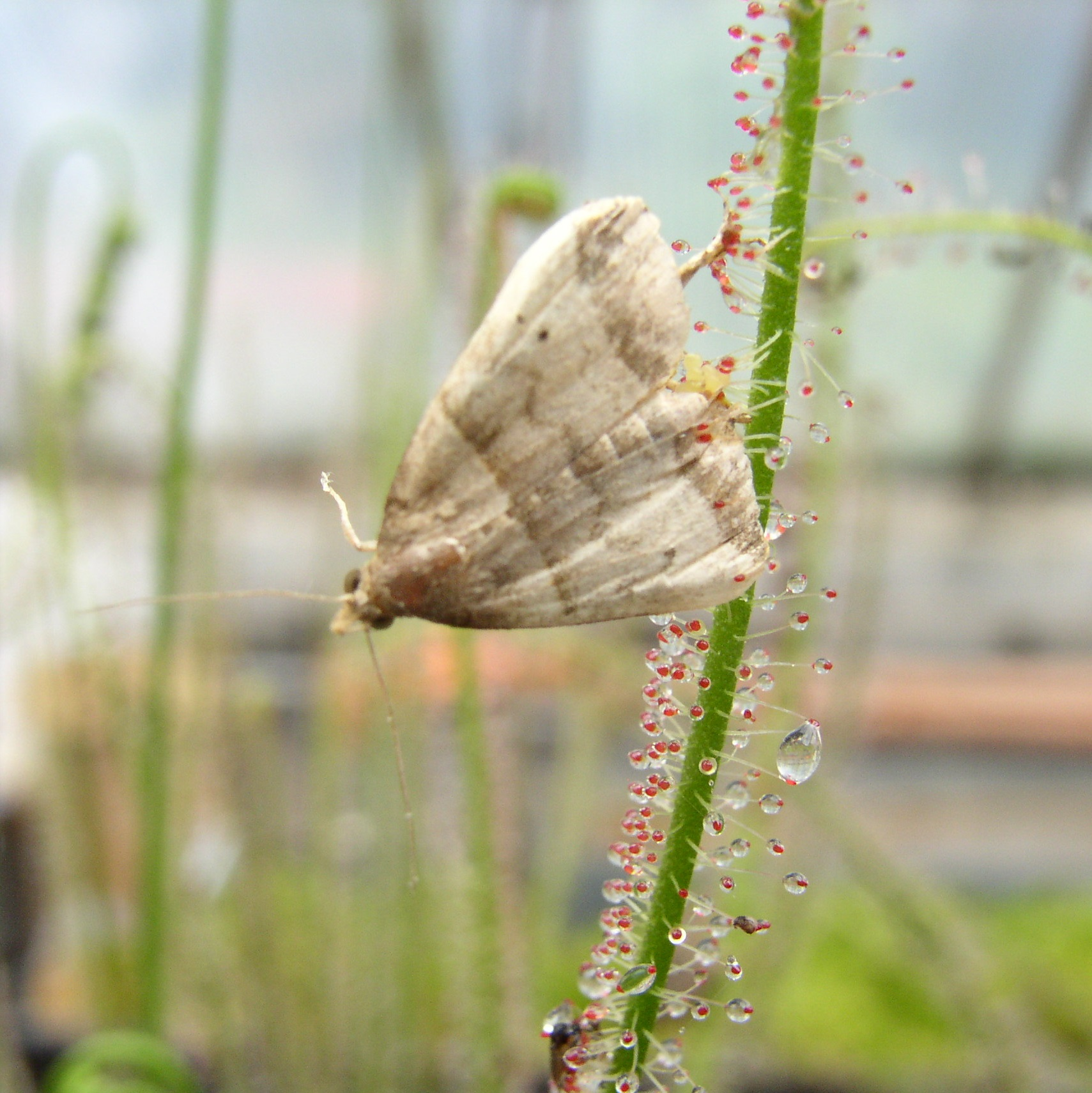
Dark-banded Owlet moth (Phalaenophana pyramusalis) trapped by Drosera filiformis

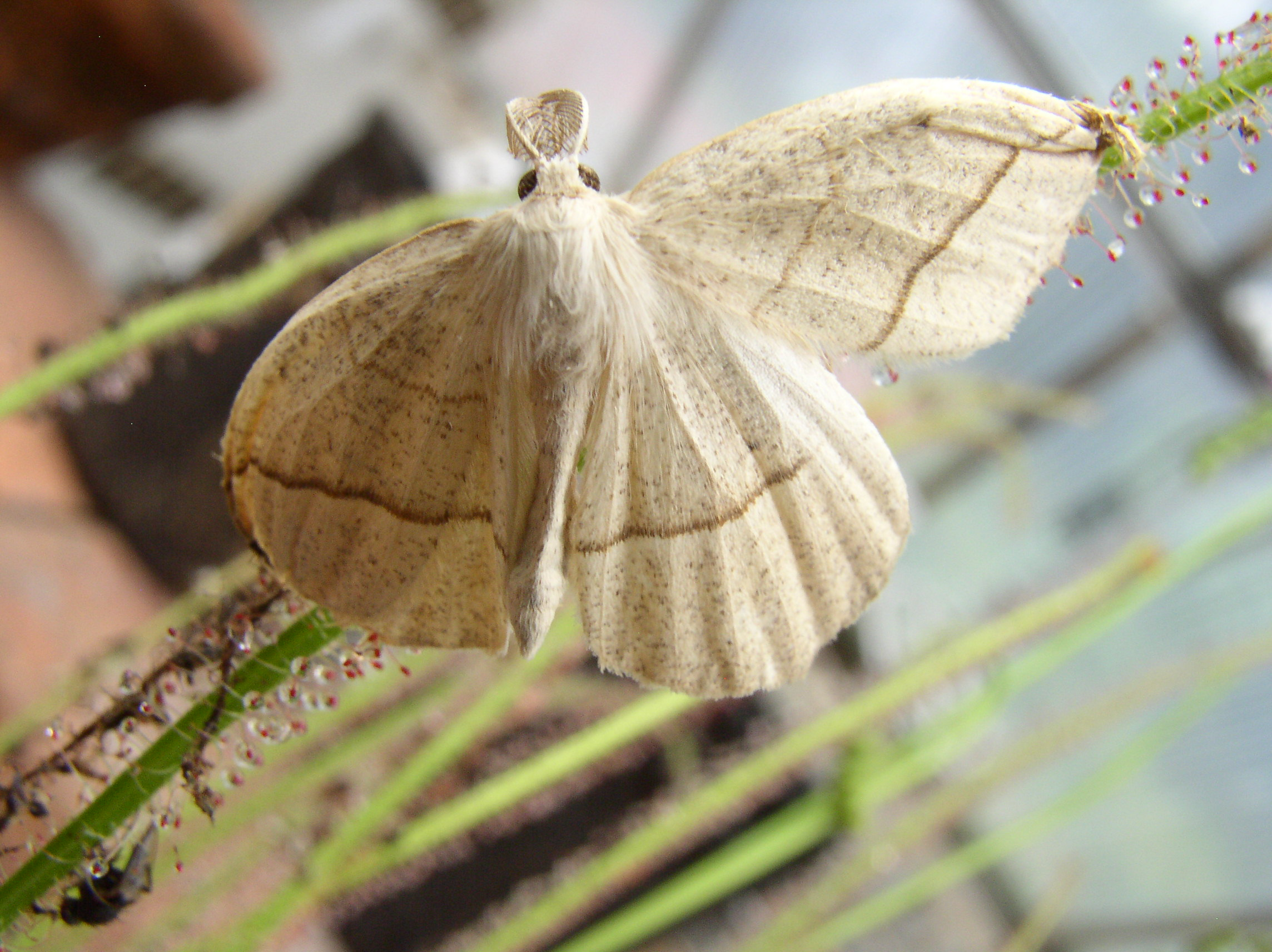
Confused eusarca moth (Eusarca confusaria) trapped by Drosera filiformis

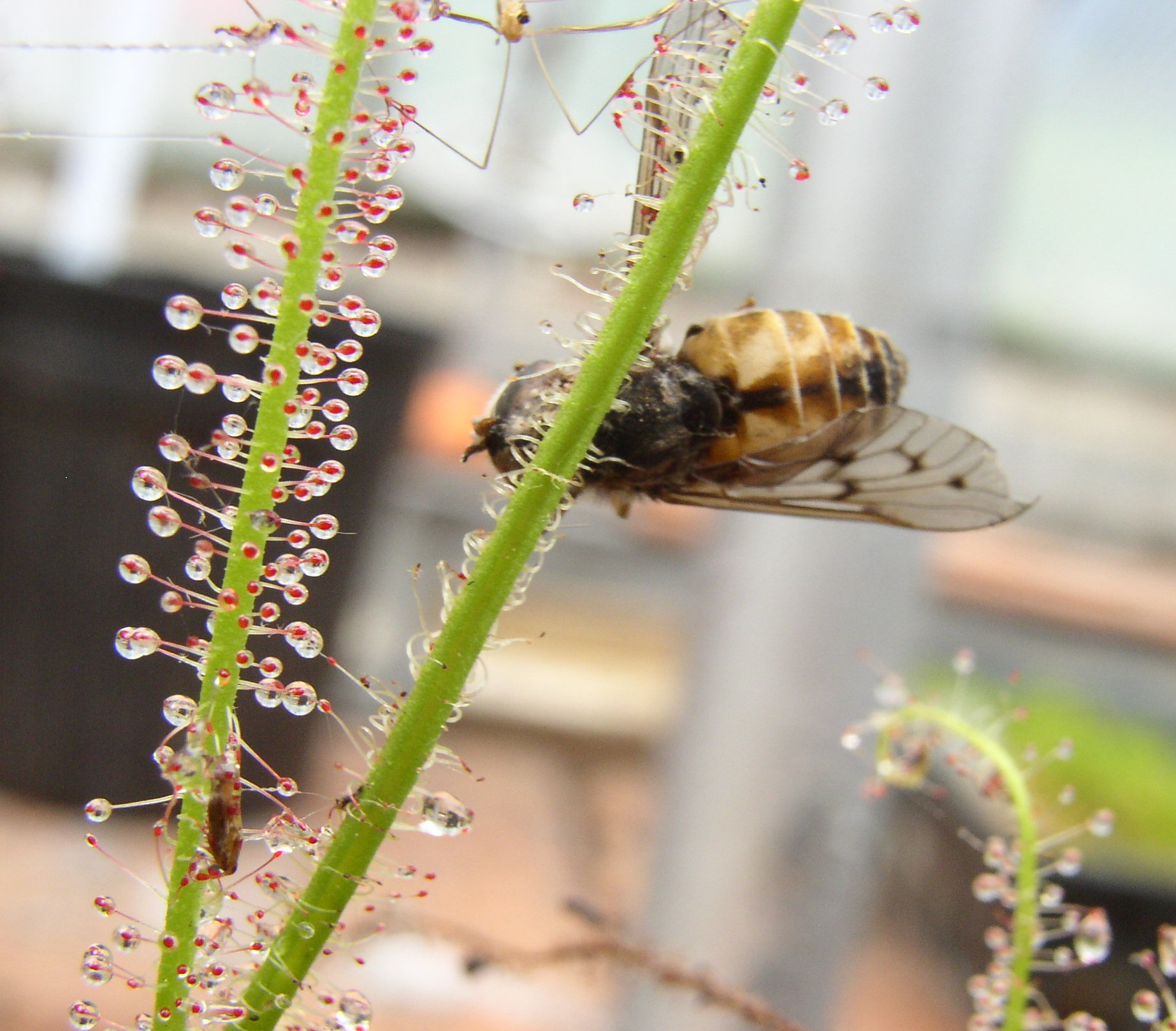
Horse fly (Tabanus) trapped by Drosera filiformis

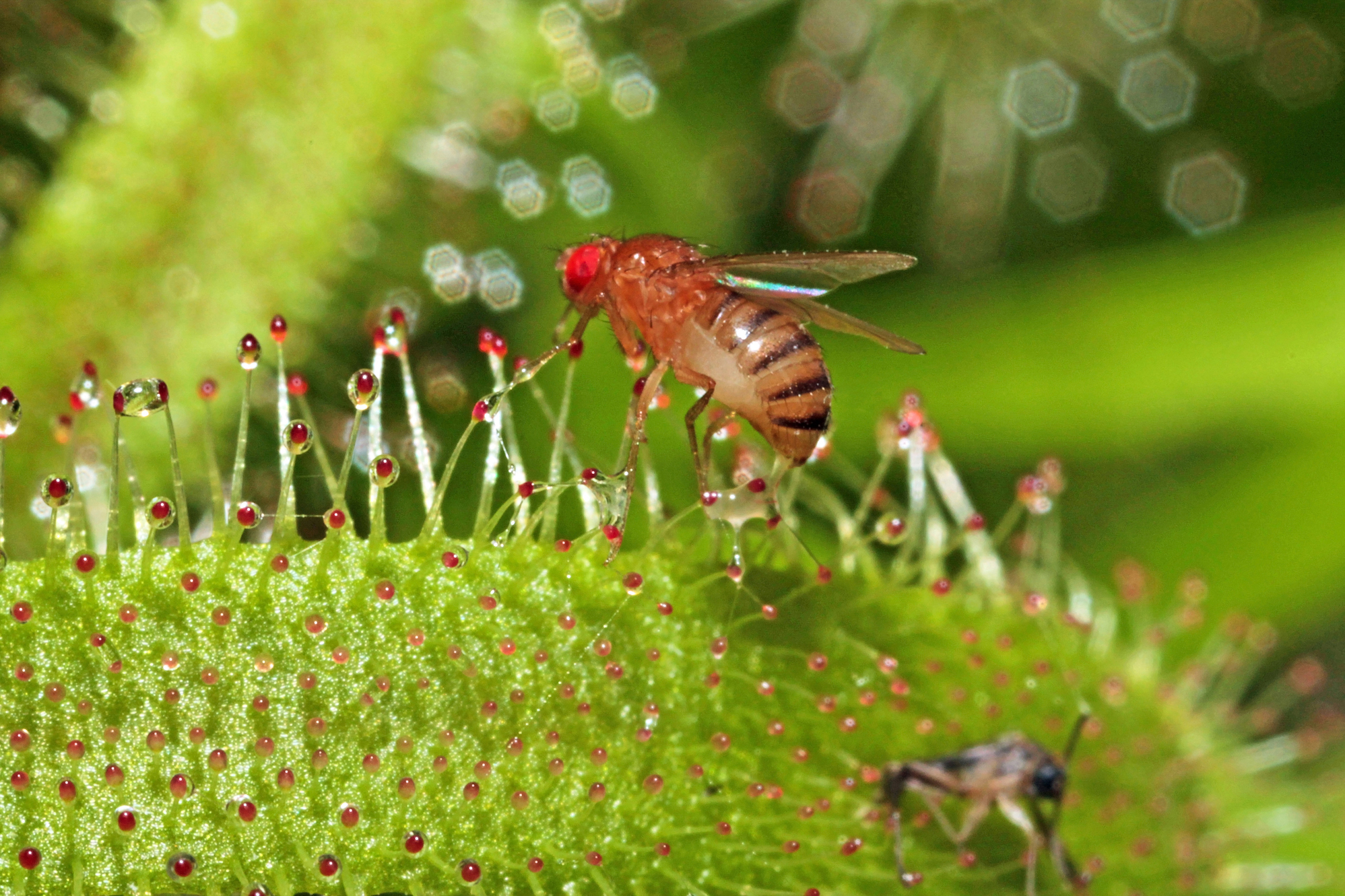
Red-eyed vinegar fly (Drosophila melanogaster) fly trapped by Drosera capensis

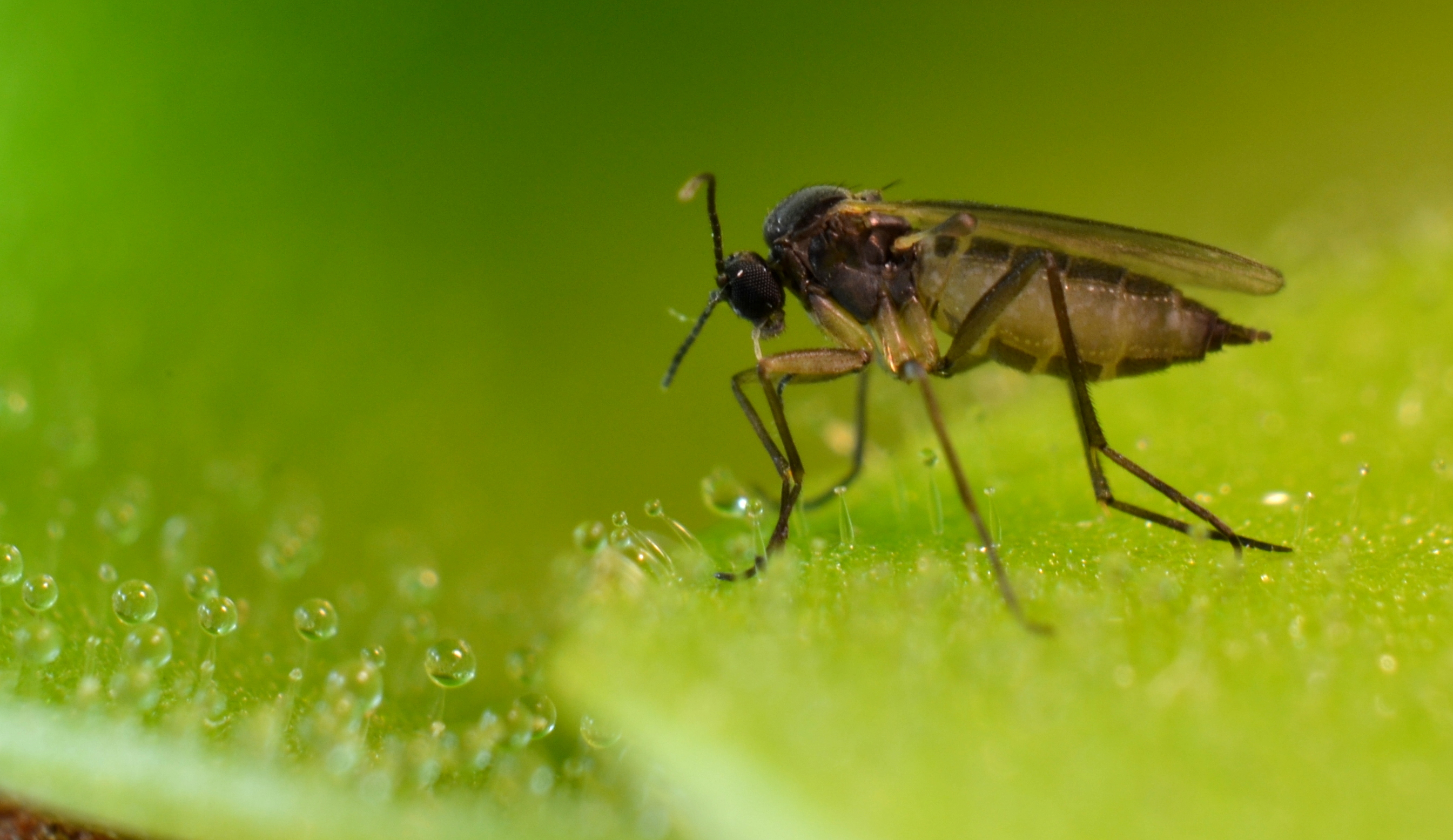
Darkwinged fungus gnat (Sciaridae) caught by Pinguicula moranensis

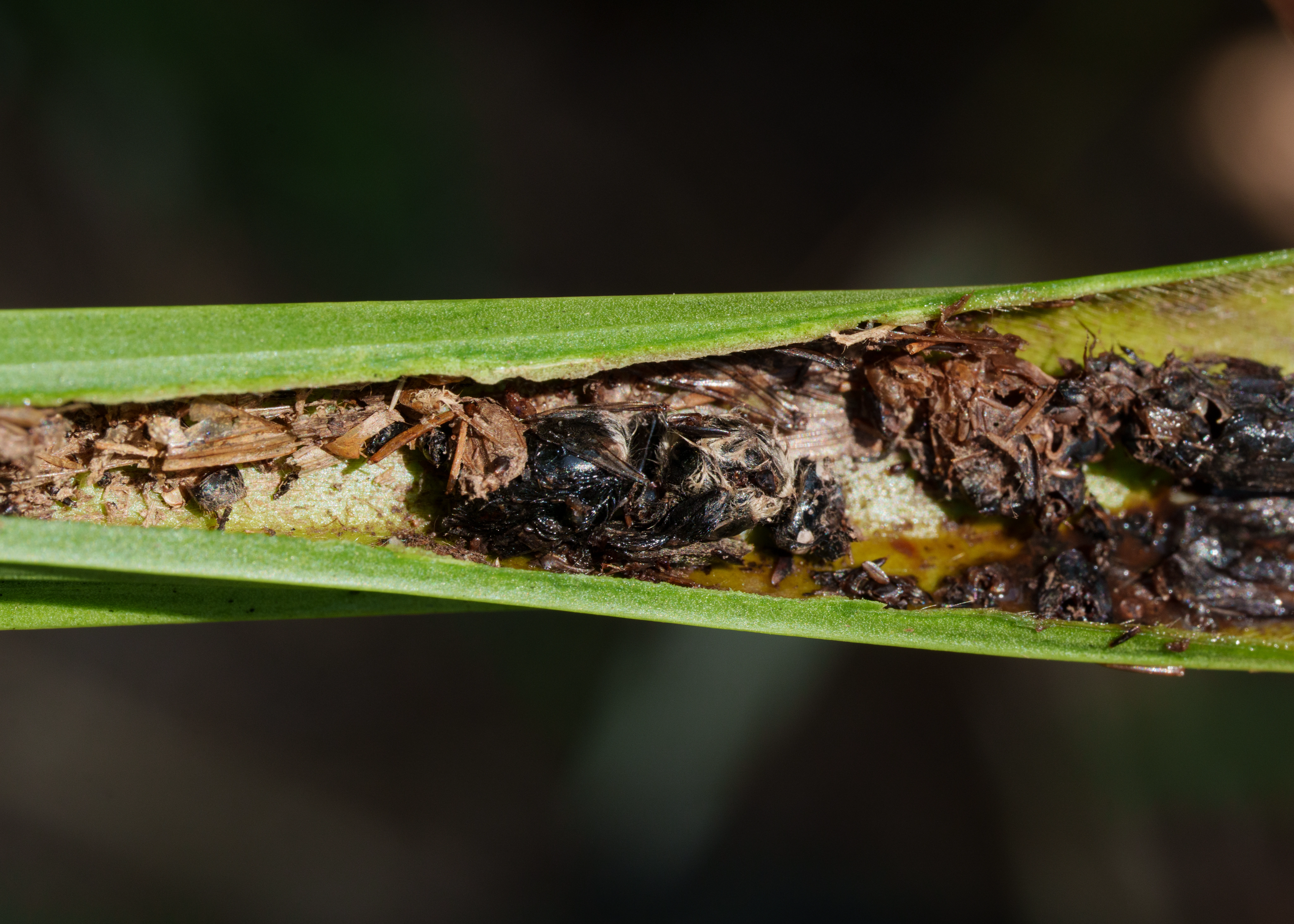
Partially digested insects inside Sarracenia leucophylla

== Cultivation ==
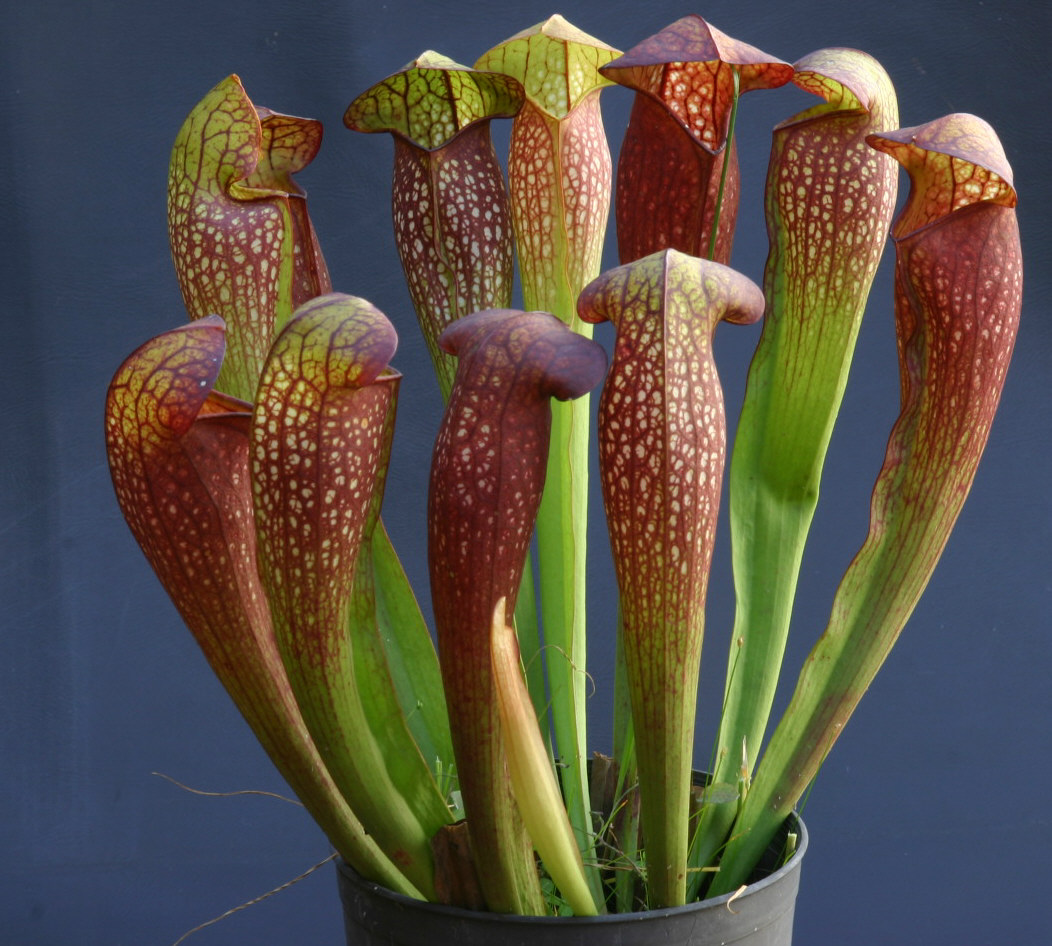
Many Sarracenia hybrids are easy to grow.

In horticulture, carnivorous plants are considered a curiosity or a rarity, but are becoming more common in cultivation with the advent of mass-production tissue-culture propagation techniques. Venus flytraps are still the most commonly grown, usually available at garden centers and hardware stores, sometimes offered alongside other easy-to-grow varieties. Nurseries that specialise in growing carnivorous plants exclusively also exist, more uncommon or demanding varieties of carnivorous plants can be obtained from specialist nurseries. California Carnivores is an example of such a nursery in the US that specialises in the cultivation of carnivorous plants.

Although different species of carnivorous plants have different cultivation requirements in terms of sunlight, humidity, soil moisture, etc., there are commonalities. Most carnivorous plants require rainwater, or water that has been distilled or deionised by reverse osmosis. Common tap or drinking water contains minerals (particularly calcium salts) that will quickly build up and kill the plant. This is because most carnivorous plants have evolved in nutrient-poor, acidic soils and are consequently extreme calcifuges. They are therefore very sensitive to excessive soil-borne nutrients. Since most of these plants are found in bogs, almost all are very intolerant of drying. There are exceptions: tuberous sundews require a dry (summer) dormancy period, and Drosophyllum requires much drier conditions than most.

Outdoor-grown carnivorous plants generally catch more than enough insects to keep themselves properly fed. Insects may be fed to the plants by hand to supplement their diet; however, carnivorous plants are generally unable to digest large non-insect food items; bits of hamburger, for example, will simply rot, and this may cause the trap, or even the whole plant, to die.

A carnivorous plant that catches no insects at all will rarely die, although its growth may be impaired. In general, these plants are best left to their own devices: after underwatering with tap-water, the most common cause of Venus flytrap death is prodding the traps to watch them close and feeding them inappropriate items.

Most carnivorous plants require bright light, and most will look better under such conditions, as this encourages them to synthesise red and purple anthocyanin pigments, (or betalain pigments within Caryophyllales). Nepenthes and Pinguicula will do better out of full sun, but most other species are happy in direct sunlight.

Carnivores mostly live in bogs, and those that do not are generally tropical. Hence, most require high humidity. On a small scale, this can be achieved by placing the plant in a wide saucer containing pebbles that are kept permanently wet. Small Nepenthes species grow well in large terraria.

Many carnivores are native to cold temperate regions and can be grown outside in a bog garden year-round. Most Sarracenia can tolerate temperatures well below freezing, despite most species being native to the southeastern United States. Species of Drosera and Pinguicula also tolerate subfreezing temperatures. Nepenthes species, which are tropical, require temperatures from 20 to 30 °C (70 to 90°F) to thrive.

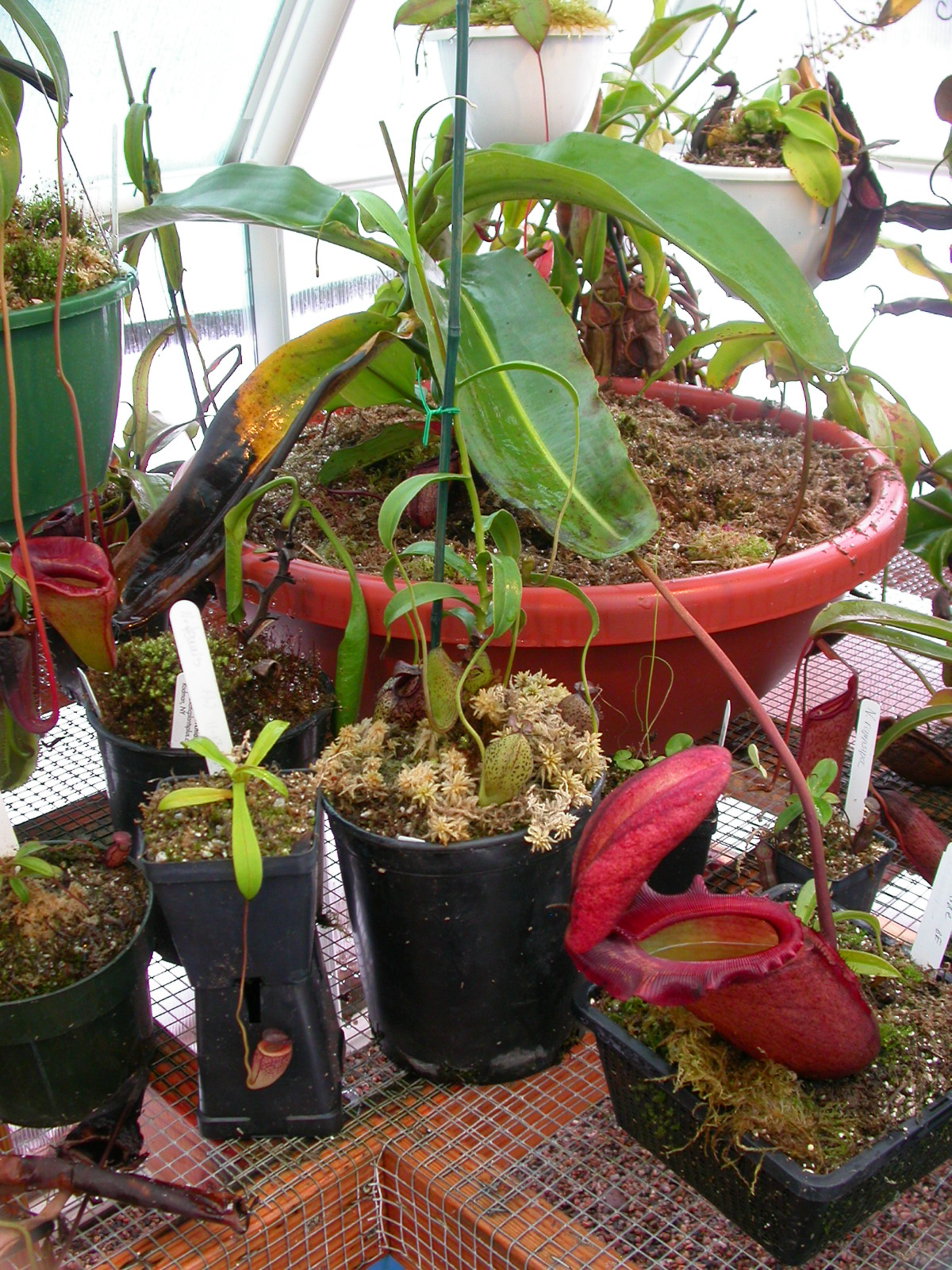
Cultivated Nepenthes rajah and a few other species.

Carnivorous plants require appropriate nutrient-poor soil. Most appreciate a 3:1 mixture of Sphagnum peat to sharp horticultural sand (coir is an acceptable, and more ecofriendly substitute for peat). Nepenthes will grow in orchid compost or in pure Sphagnum moss.

Carnivorous plants are themselves susceptible to infestation by parasites such as aphids or mealybugs. Although small infestations can be removed by hand, larger infestations necessitate use of an insecticide.

Isopropyl alcohol (rubbing alcohol) is effective as a topical insecticide, particularly on scale insects. Diazinon is an excellent systemic insecticide that is tolerated by most carnivorous plants. Malathion and Acephate (Orthene) have also been reported as tolerable by carnivorous plants.

Although insects can be a problem, by far the biggest killer of carnivorous plants (besides human maltreatment) is grey mold (Botrytis cinerea). This thrives under warm, humid conditions and can be a real problem in winter. To some extent, temperate carnivorous plants can be protected from this pathogen by ensuring that they are kept cool and well ventilated in winter and that any dead leaves are removed promptly. If this fails, a fungicide is in order.

The easiest carnivorous plants for beginners are those from the cool temperate zone. These plants will do well under cool greenhouse conditions (minimum 5 °C; 40°F in winter, maximum 25 °C; 75°F in summer) if kept in wide trays of acidified or rain water during summer and kept moist during winter:

- Drosera capensis, the Cape sundew: attractive strap-leaved sundew, pink flowers, very tolerant of maltreatment.
- Drosera binata, the fork-leaved sundew: large, Y-shaped leaves.
- Sarracenia flava, the yellow trumpet pitcher: yellow, attractively veined leaves, yellow flowers in spring.
- Pinguicula grandiflora, the common butterwort: purple flowers in spring, hibernates as a bud (hibernaculum) in winter. Fully hardy.
- Pinguicula moranensis, the Mexican butterwort: pink flowers, non-carnivorous leaves in winter.

Venus flytraps will do well under these conditions but are actually rather difficult to grow: even if treated well, they will often succumb to grey mold in winter unless well ventilated. Some of the lowland Nepenthes are very easy to grow as long as they are provided with relatively constant, hot and humid conditions.

== Cultural depictions ==
In 1789, Erasmus Darwin described Drosera in the second part of his poem The Botanic Garden:

"Queen of the marsh, imperial Drosera treads

Rush-fringed banks, and moss-embroider'd beds; ...
Bright shines the silver halo, as she turns;

And, as she steps, the living lustre burns.

However, Erasmus Darwin and others of his generation assumed that the "wonderful contrivance[s]" of carnivorous plants were solely defense mechanisms to "prevent various insects from plundering the honey, or devouring the seed". They realized that the plants were killing insects, but did not understand why. Erasmus Darwin's grandson, Charles Darwin, and great-grandson, Francis Darwin, spent many years studying carnivorous plants. Charles Darwin recognized and described the significance of plant carnivory for nutrition.

In 1860, residents of Providence, Rhode Island, dug up the grave of that state's founder Roger Williams, intending to move his remains to a new memorial in his honor. They found only teeth, nails, bone fragments, and an apple tree root that had grown along where his body had been, forking midway to follow his legs. The now-severed root forms its own sort of memorial, and has been called "The tree (or root) that ate Roger Williams".

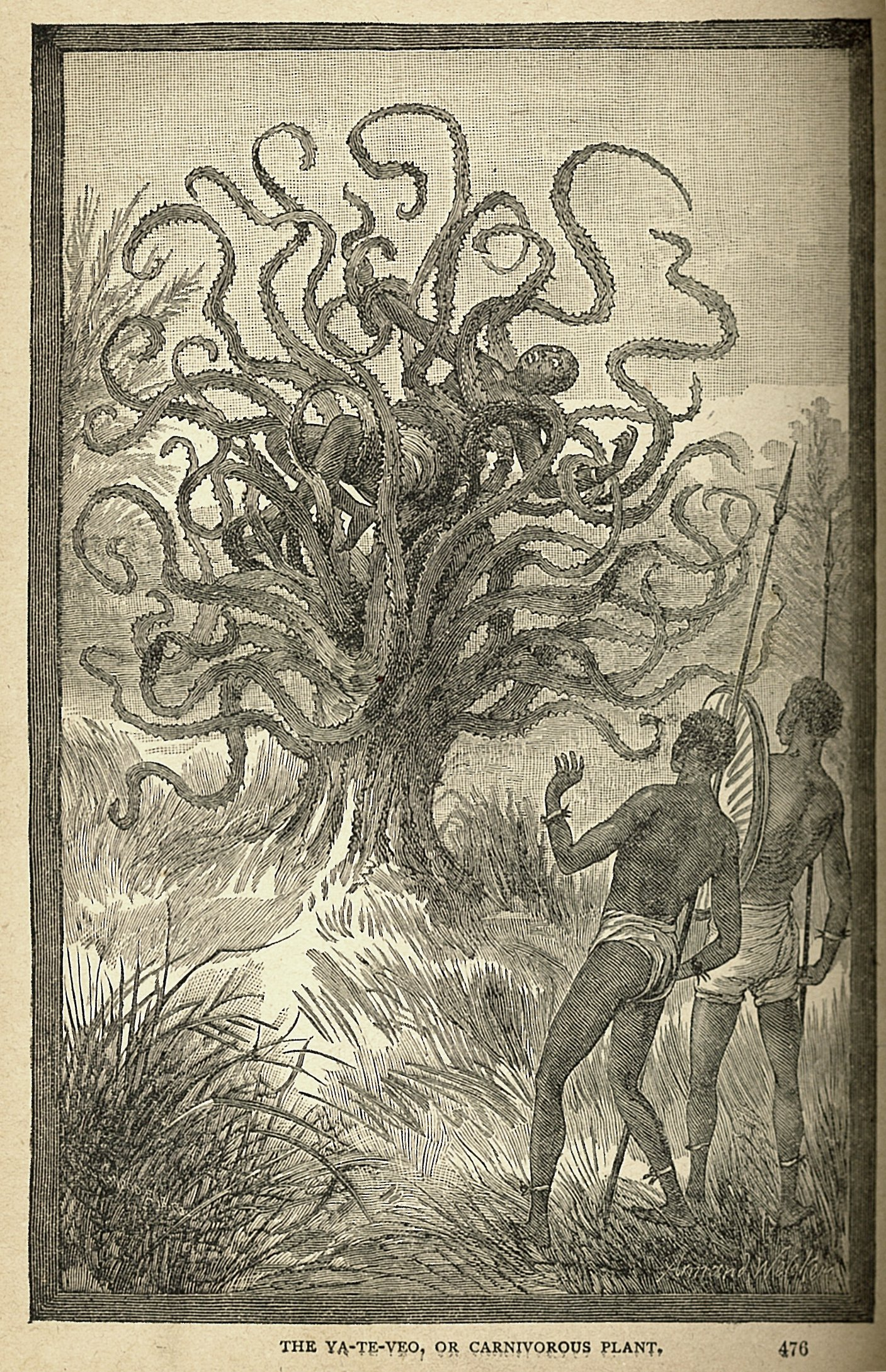
Depiction of a native being consumed by a Yateveo ("I see you") carnivorous tree of Central America, from Land and Sea by J.W. Buel, 1887

Possibly the earliest published account of a man-eating plant was a literary fabrication that first appeared in 1874. The story of Crinoida dajeeana, also known as the Devil Tree of Madagascar or Man-Eating Tree of Madagascar, first appeared in the daily edition of the New York World on 26 April 1874, and again in the weekly edition two days later. It purported to be from a German explorer named "Karl Leche" (also spelled as Karl or Carl Liche in later accounts), who described seeing a woman fed to a tree as a sacrifice by the "little known but cruel" "Mkodo tribe" of Madagascar. Authorship of the fantastical story would later be attributed by Frederick Maxwell Somers to one Edmund Spencer in the August 1888 issue of the magazine Current Literature. The story was reprinted widely, appearing as far away as the South Australian Register in 1881, where it was accompanied by an illustration of a tree consuming a woman. The account has been debunked as pure myth, and Dr. Liche, the Mkodos, and the tree itself were all fabrications.

Crinoida dajeeana notwithstanding, carnivorous plants are credited with widely entering the popular imagination through the nonfiction publications of Charles Darwin. Insectivorous Plants (1875), followed by The Power of Movement in Plants (1880), challenged the idea of a what a plant was and what it was capable of doing, and inspired authors like Arthur Conan Doyle to imagine enormous and sometimes mobile man-eaters. Doyle modeled the sticky end of a character in "The American's Tale" (1880) on a venus flytrap. H. G. Wells imagined a tentacular blood-sucking plant in "The Flowering of the Strange Orchid" (1894).

Since then, carnivorous plants have been the subject of popular interest and exposition, much of it highly inaccurate. Typically, these fictional depictions include exaggerated characteristics, such as enormous size or possession of abilities beyond the realm of reality, and can be viewed as a kind of artistic license. In a 1939 pamphlet on carnivorous plants written for the Field Museum, Sophia Prior recounts the Man-Eating Tree of Madagascar and other "stories of vegetable monsters". She dismisses them all as fables, and notes that they are invariably set in locales that are "indefinite" and "difficult of access".

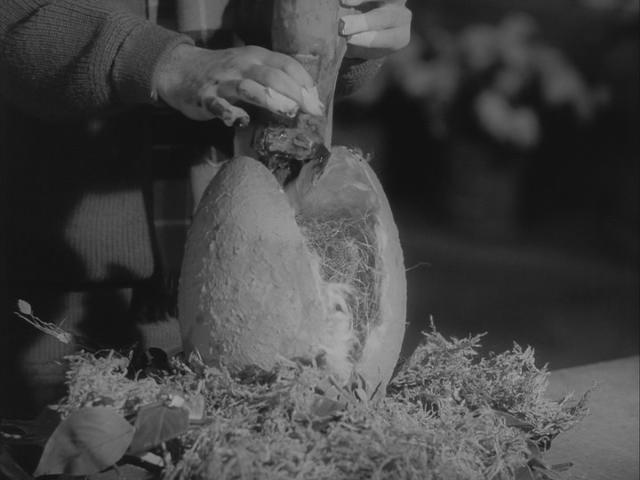
Audrey Jr., the man-eating plant from cult film The Little Shop of Horrors

Fictional carnivorous plants have been featured in books, movies, television series, and video games. Some, such as the mockumentary The Hellstrom Chronicle (1971), use accurate depictions of carnivorous plants for cinematic purposes, while others depend more heavily on imagination.

Two of the most famous examples of fictional carnivorous plants in popular culture are the triffids of John Wyndham's 1951 novel The Day of the Triffids and Audrey Jr./II, the man-eating plant in the 1960s black comedy The Little Shop of Horrors and its subsequent stage musical adaptation.

Carnivorous flowers appear in one of the episodes of Zdenek Miler's famous Czech cartoon, The Little Mole (Krtek a medicína / The Little Mole and Medicine, 1987). Here, the little mole is in Africa, and the carnivorous flowers swallow a fly. The little mole also gets his hand caught, but he is unable to pull it out. The little mole tries to "feed" the carnivorous flower an incomprehensible stone in revenge, but the flower is "intelligent" and spits the stone back out.
