= Steel trap (carnivorous plants) =

Prey capture device of some carnivorous plants

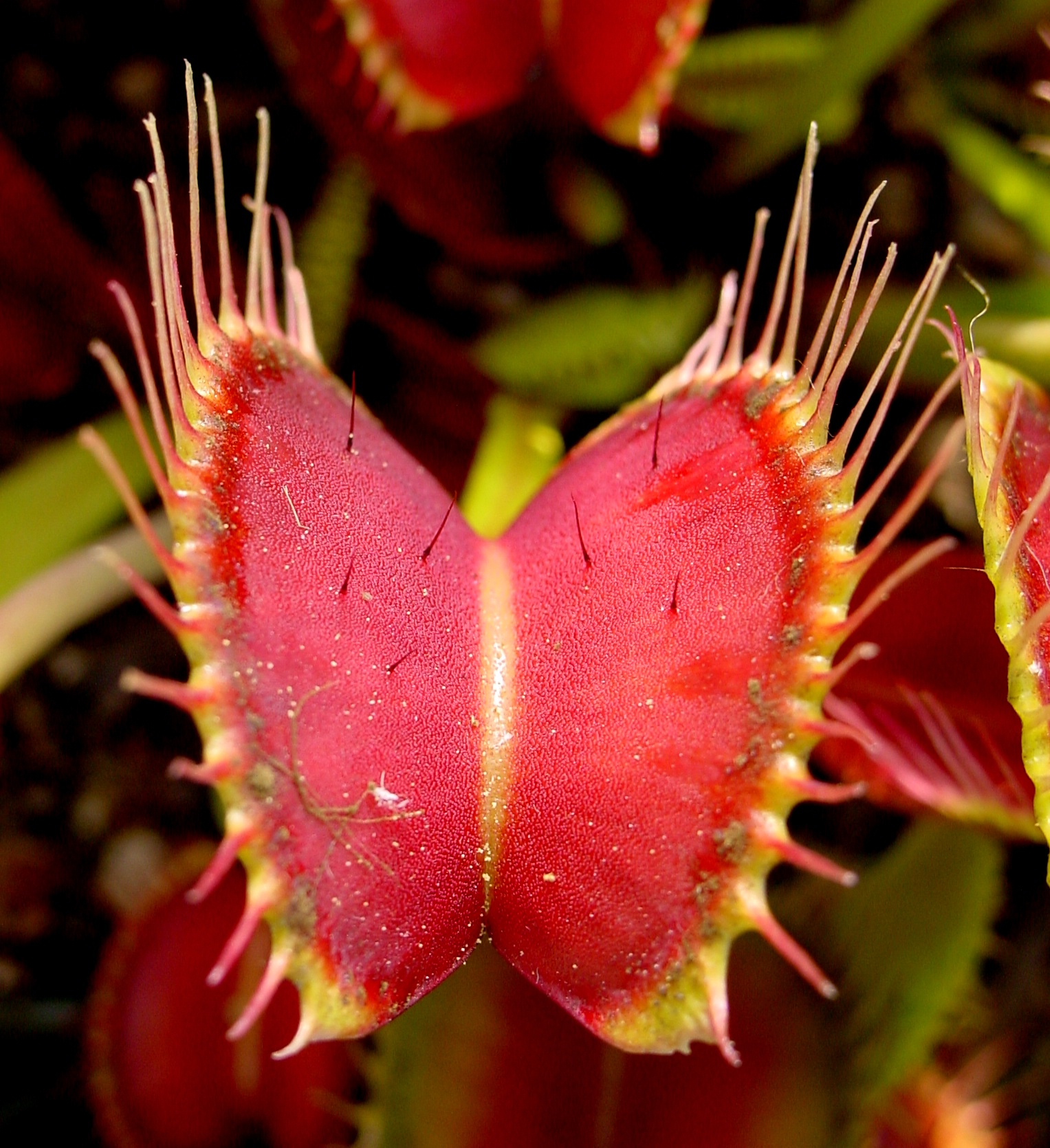
Venus Flytrap showing open lobes, trigger hairs

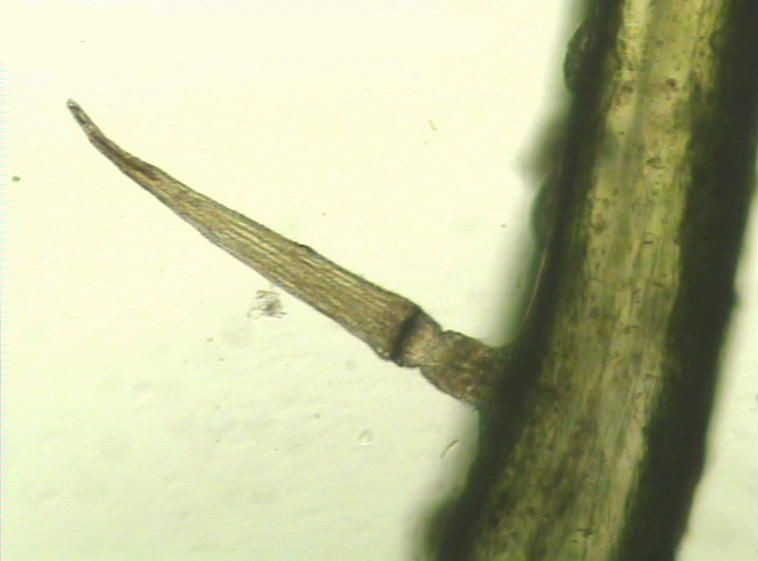
Detail of Dionaea trigger hair

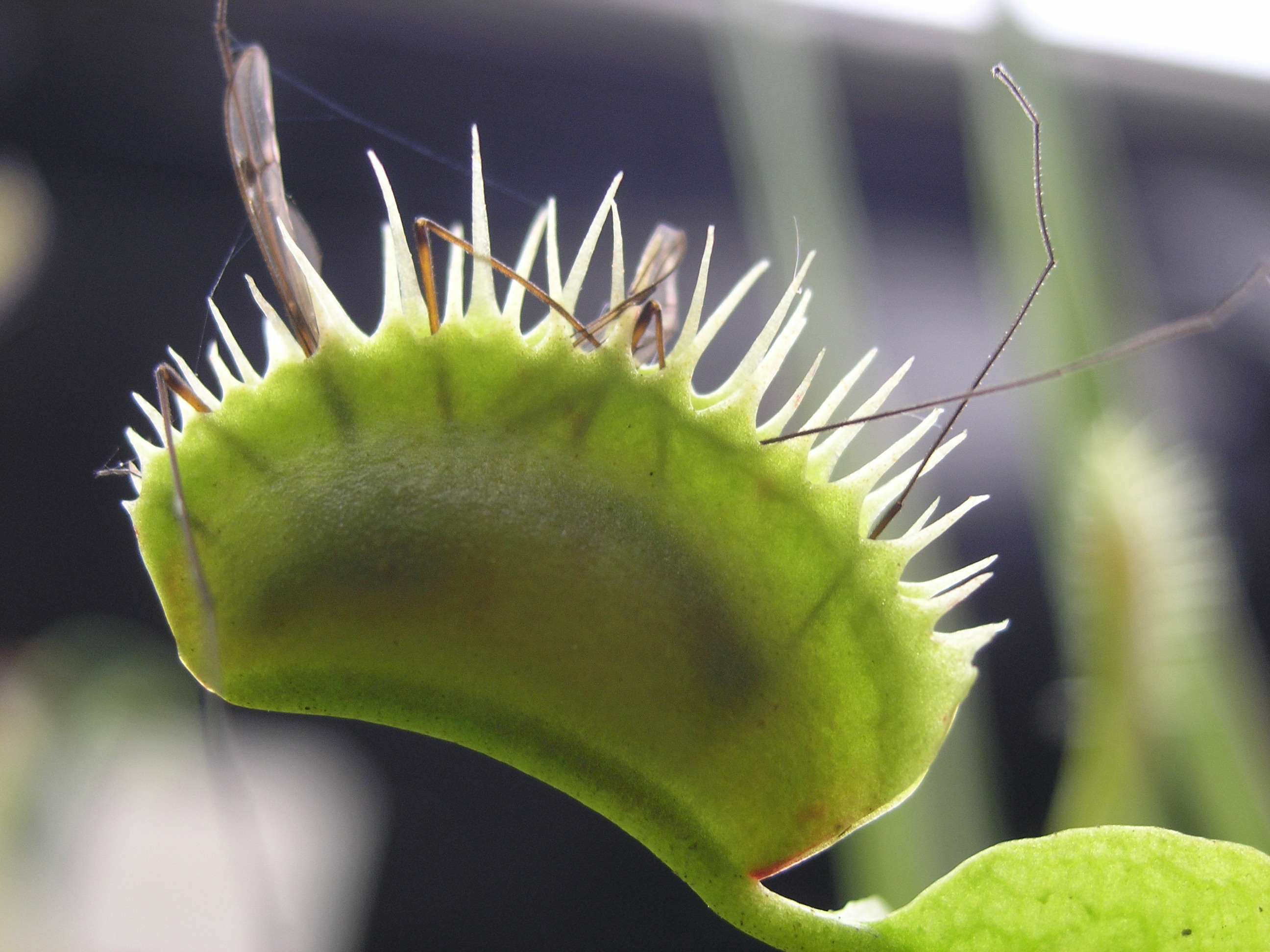
Dionaea trap containing a cranefly (Tipulidae), showing that the leaf spine is not the hinge.

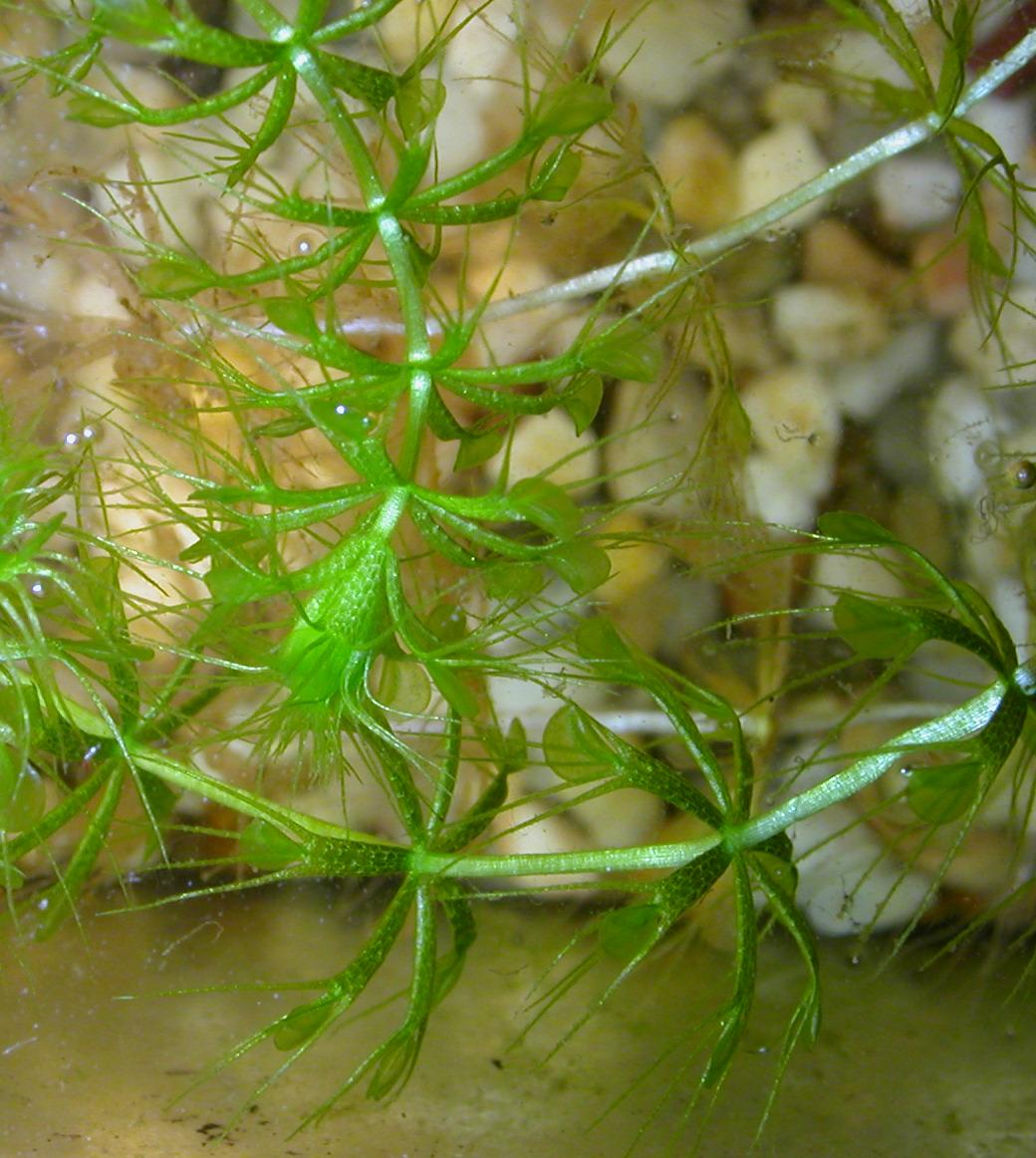
Aldrovanda vesiculosa with its whorls of steel-trap leaves.

Steel trap (sometimes written "steel-trap" or "steeltrap") is an informal term in the study of comparative plant physiology of the carnivorous plants. "Steel trap", more particularly "active steel trap", refers to prey capture devices such as occur in some members of the family Droseraceae, and in particular in the genera Dionaea ("Venus flytrap") and Aldrovanda ("waterwheel"). The term apparently originated with the author Francis Ernest Lloyd in 1942, in which he adopted the overly general term "steel trap" rather than say, "gin trap" or a more adjectival form, for devices such as the lobed trap leaves of Dionaea.

The distinctive attributes of "steel trap" devices are that:

- they are active, capturing prey with positive movements, not relying on mere stickiness, hooks, pitfalls or the like;
- prey capturing activity occurs only in response to specific tactile stimuli — prey making contact with sensory bristles;
- the action is a thigmonastic, stereotyped, rapid movement (often completed in well under one second).

When the term "steel trap" originally was published, it apparently referred in part to the shape of the trap mechanism, but in terms of their functional significance rather than their shape, the associated concepts listed could apply equally well to the bladder traps of Utricularia and to the more recently described action of the Australian sundew species Drosera glanduligera. Those species also trap actively, in response to tactile stimuli, using a rapid thigmonastic response.

At all events, the "active steel trap" mechanism differs in one or more of these respects from trap mechanisms in other members of the family Droseraceae. It also differs from other passive trapping mechanisms such as those of the pitfall traps of pitcher plants. The genus Drosophyllum for example, uses the "passive flypaper" mechanism, in which prey in contact with the sticky fluid on the bristles of the leaves simply get more tangled as they struggle.

This "passive flypaper" mechanism of Drosophyllum differs in turn from the "active flypaper" trap of the related sundew genus Drosera. The adhesive-bearing bristles or "tentacles" of most Drosera species nastically bend inwards, trapping the struggling insect, and commencing the process of digestion. These movements are slow and very different from the steel trap action.

Drosera glanduligera has a mechanism in some ways different from the typical "active flypaper" of most Drosera species. Its sticky tentacles grow only in the flat area of its round, peltate leaves; around the margin of the leaf there are long, jointed tentacles that snap inwards when stimulated, catapulting prey inward to succumb to the sticky tentacles in the usual manner.
