= Turion =

Turion may refer to:

- Turion (botany), winter bud in aquatic species
- AMD Turion, family of AMD 64-bit processors
