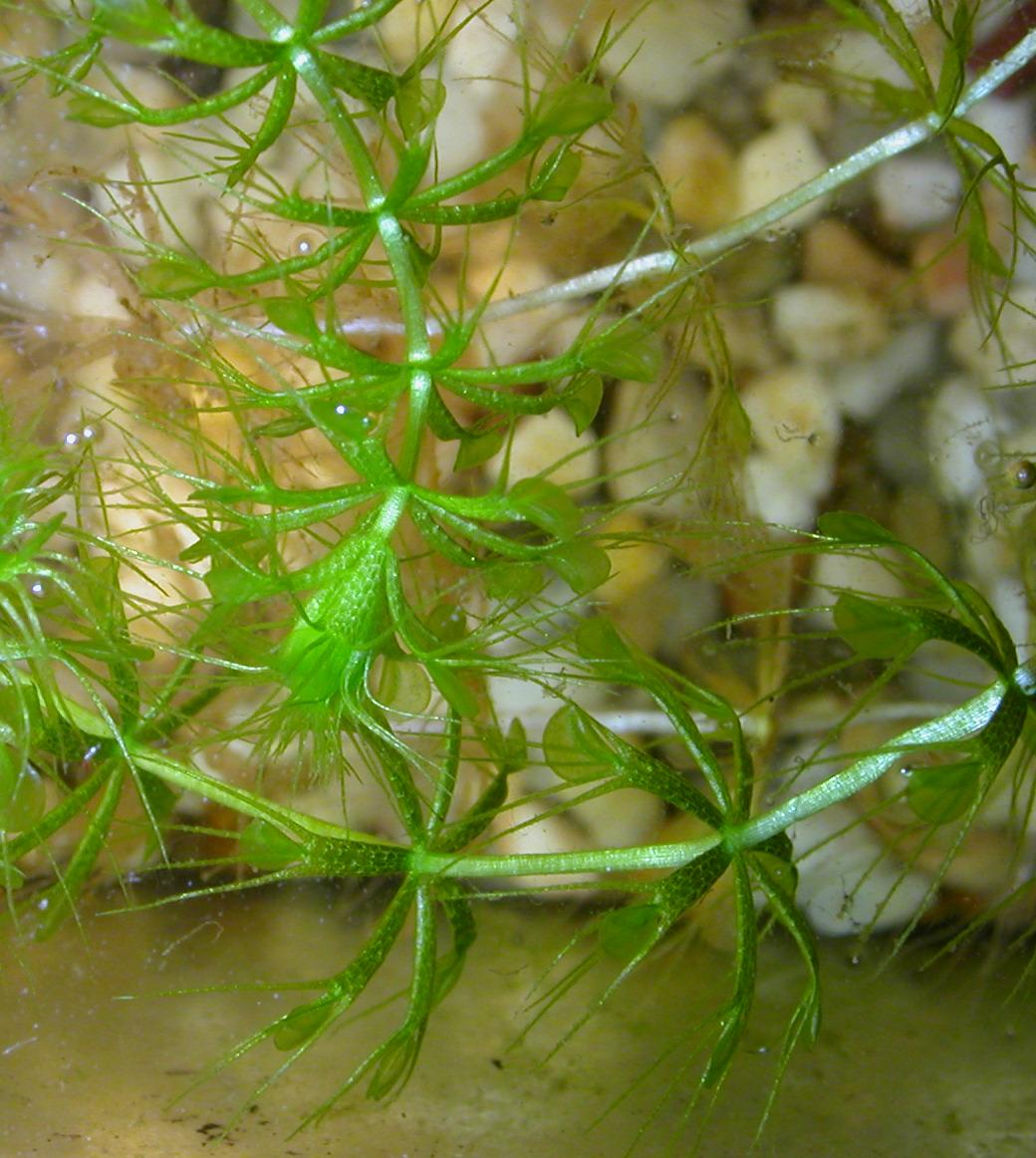

Conservation status
- Endangered (IUCN 3.1)

Scientific classification
- Kingdom: Plantae
- Clade: Tracheophytes
- Clade: Angiosperms
- Clade: Eudicots
- Order: Caryophyllales
- Family: Droseraceae
- Genus: Aldrovanda
- Species: A. vesiculosa

Binomial name
- Aldrovanda vesiculosa L.
- Distribution

Synonyms
- Drosera aldrovanda F.Muell.; Anacampseros polyphylla (Haw.) Sweet; Ruelingia polyphylla Haw.; Aldrovanda generalis E.H.L.Krause; Aldrovanda verticillata Roxb.; Aldrovanda vesiculosa var. australis Darwin; Aldrovanda vesiculosa var. duriaei Casp.; Aldrovanda vesiculosa var. rubescens A.T.Cross & Adamec; Aldrovanda vesiculosa var. verticillata (Roxb.) Darwin; Talinum polyphyllum (Haw.) Link

= Aldrovanda vesiculosa =

Species of plant (waterwheel plant)

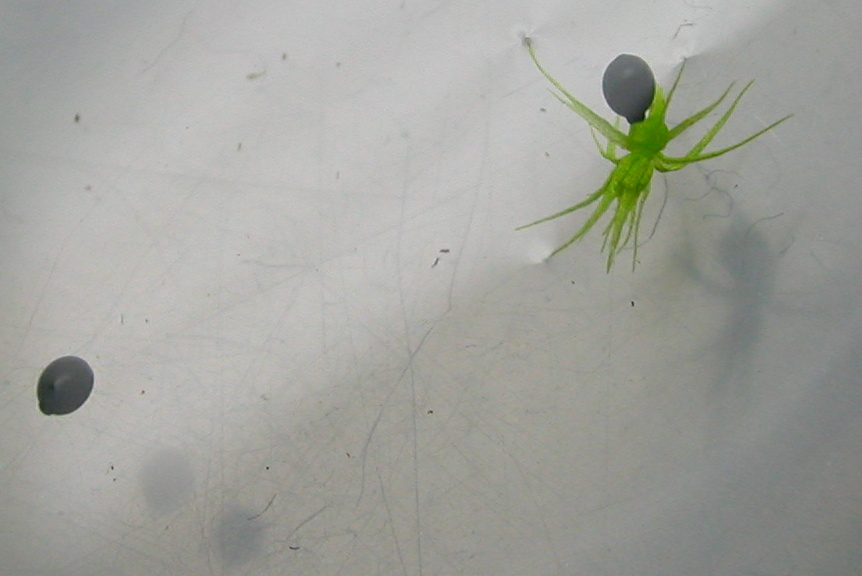
Germinating Aldrovanda seeds

Aldrovanda vesiculosa, commonly known as the waterwheel plant, is the sole extant species in the flowering plant genus Aldrovanda of the family Droseraceae. The plant captures small aquatic invertebrates using traps similar to those of the Venus flytrap. The traps are arranged in whorls around a central, free-floating stem, giving rise to the common name. This is one of the few plant species capable of rapid movement.

While the genus Aldrovanda is now monotypic, up to 19 extinct species are known in the fossil record. While the species displays a degree of morphological plasticity between populations, A. vesiculosa possesses a very low genetic diversity across its entire range.

A. vesiculosa has declined over the last century to only 50 confirmed extant populations worldwide. These are spread across Europe, Africa, Asia, and Australia. However, potentially invasive populations exist in the eastern United States. It is kept by hobbyists.

== Morphology ==
Aldrovanda vesiculosa is a rootless aquatic plant. Seedlings develop a short protoroot; however, this fails to develop further and senesces. The plant consists of floating stems reaching a length of 6–40 cm (2–16 in). The 2–3 mm (1/16–1/8 in) trap leaves grow in whorls of between 5 and 9 in close succession along the plant's central stem. The actual traps are held by petioles which have air sacs that aid in flotation. One end of the stem continually grows while the other end dies off. Growth is quite rapid (4–9 mm (3/16–3/8 in) per day in Japanese populations), so that in optimal conditions a new whorl is produced once or more each day.

=== Trap ===
The actual traps consist of two lobes which fold together to form a snap-trap similar to that of the Venus flytrap, except that it is smaller and located underwater. These traps, which are twisted so that the trap openings point outward, are lined on the inside by a fine coating of trigger hairs, snapping shut in response to contact with aquatic invertebrates and trapping them. The closing of this trap takes 10–20 milliseconds, making it one of the fastest examples of plant movement in the kingdom. This trapping is only possible in warm conditions of at least 20 °C (68 °F). Each trap is surrounded by between four and six 6–8 millimetres (1/4–3/8 in) long bristles that prevent triggering of traps by debris in the water.

=== Nutrient acquisition ===
A. vesiculosa is able to grow in nutrient-poor habitats not only due to its carnivory, but also due to its ability to re-utilize nutrients from senesced shoots, and its high affinity for mineral nutrients in water.

=== Reproduction ===
==== Flowers ====
The small, solitary white flowers of A. vesiculosa are supported above the water by short peduncles which arise from whorl axes. The flower only opens for a few hours, after which the structure is brought back beneath the water for seed production. The seeds are cryptocotylar: the cotyledons remain hidden within the seed coat and serve as an energy store for the seedling. Flowering, however, is rare in temperate regions and poorly successful in terms of fruit and seed development.

==== Divisions ====
Aldrovanda vesiculosa reproduces most often through vegetative reproduction. In favourable conditions, adult plants will produce an offshoot every 3–4 cm (1 1/8–1 5/8 in), resulting in new plants as the tips continue to grow and the old ends die off and separate. Due to the rapid growth rate of this species, countless new plants can be produced in a short period of time in this fashion.

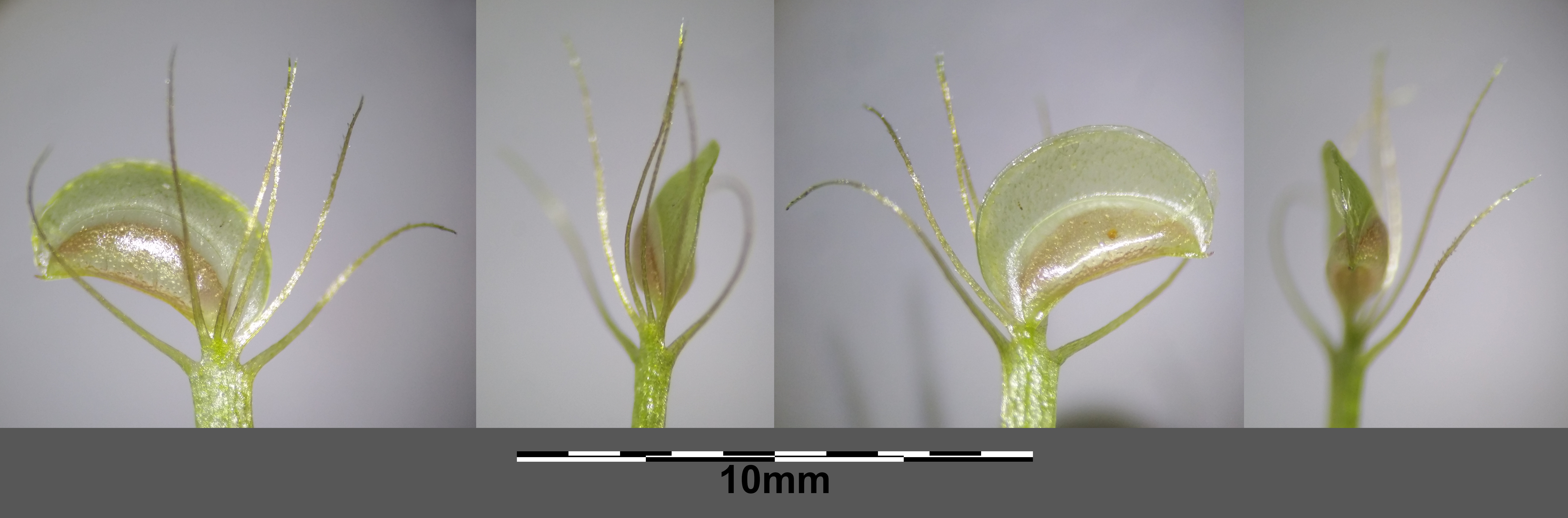
Trap of Aldrovanda

=== Turions ===
Winter-hardy Aldrovanda form turions as a frost survival strategy. At the onset of winter, the growth tip starts producing highly reduced non-carnivorous leaves on a severely shortened stem. This results in a tight bud of protective leaves which, being heavier and having released flotational gases, breaks off the mother plant and sinks to the water bottom, where temperatures are stable and warmer. Here it can withstand temperatures as low as −15 °C (5 °F). In the wild, Aldrovanda turions have been observed to have a relatively low rate of successful sinking. Those nutritious turions that fail to sink are then grazed by waterfowl or are killed by the onset of frost. In spring when water temperatures rise above 12–15 °C (54–59 °F), turions reduce their density and float to the top of the water, where they germinate and resume growth. Non-dormant turion-like organs can also form in response to summer drought.

== Distribution ==
Aldrovanda vesiculosa is the second most widely distributed carnivorous plant species, only behind members of the genus Utricularia, native to Europe, Asia, Africa, and Australia. Aldrovanda is spread mainly through the movement of waterfowl: plants sticking to the feet of a bird are transported to the next aquatic destination on the bird's route. As a result, most Aldrovanda populations are located along avian migratory routes. Throughout the last century the species has become increasingly rare, listed as extinct in an increasingly large number of countries. In the 1970s, carnivorous plant hobbyists introduced this species to small backyard ponds in the United States in the states of New Jersey, Virginia, and the Catskills of New York, and they may be a potentially invasive species due to their effects on aquatic invertebrates.

== Threats ==
=== Habitat degradation and modification ===
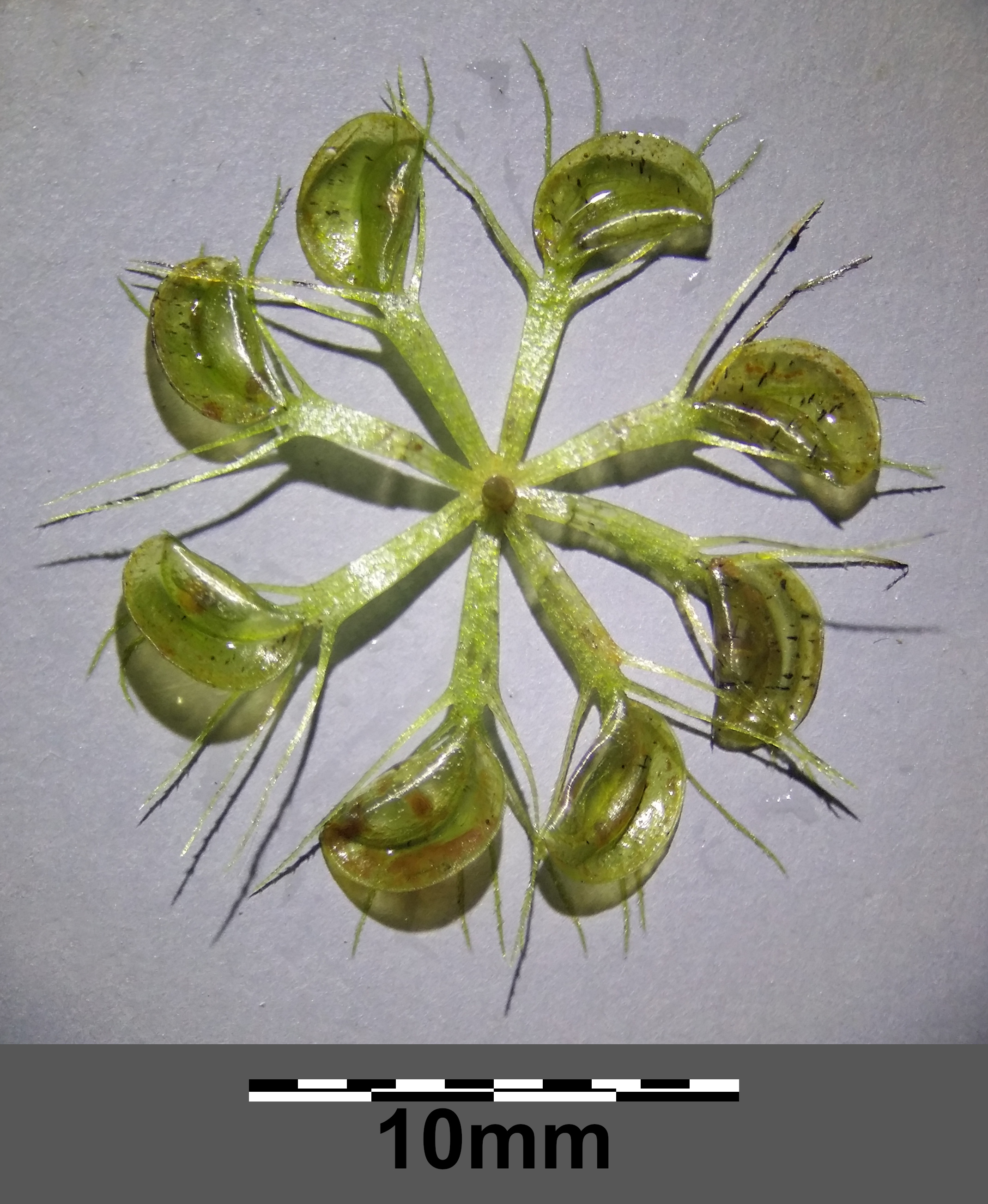
Traps of the water wheel plant

The waterwheel plant faces significant conservation threats related to habitat degradation and human-induced modifications. Residential and commercial development, along with agricultural and aquacultural activities, pose immediate risks to the species. The impacts of these activities on the plant's aquatic habitats are of particular concern.

=== Environmental changes ===
Across Europe, the species is confronted by several environmental challenges, as identified by the Commission of the European Union. Acidification, canalization, drainage, eutrophication, pollution, and various forms of habitat modification are highlighted as threats. These changes in the natural environment have the potential to disrupt the waterwheel plant's habitats and populations.

=== Potential illegal trade ===
While the extent and effects of illegal trade remain uncertain, it is believed that some illegal activities involving Aldrovanda vesiculosa may occur. This potential threat adds complexity to the conservation challenges faced by the species.

== Habitat ==
A. vesiculosa inhabits clean, shallow and, warm standing water with high light availability, low nutrient concentrations, and slightly acidic pH (around 6). It is usually found floating among vegetation such as Juncus, reeds, and sometimes rice.

The Waterwheel (Aldrovanda vesiculosa) thrives in a range of aquatic habitats, including small fens, peat-bog pools, billabongs, lakes, lagoons, and river deltas. It prefers oligo-mesotrophic and dystrophic systems with low nutrient levels. These plants are commonly found in shallow backwaters or the littoral zones of larger lakes, where they face less competition from other aquatic species and where water levels remain relatively stable throughout the growing season. The Waterwheel is highly intolerant of habitat degradation, and even minor changes in water chemistry can lead to local extinction.

== Botanical history ==
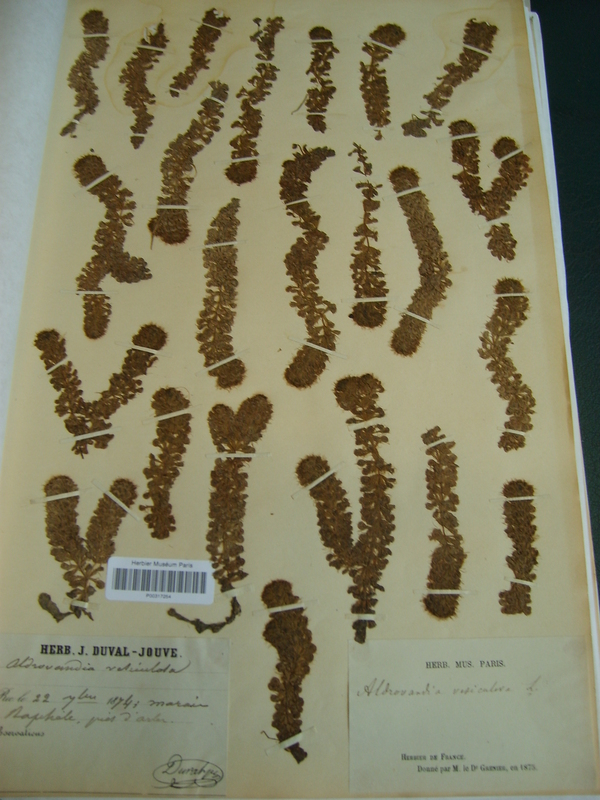
Herbarium specimens deposited at the Museum National d'Histoire Naturelle in Paris

Aldrovanda vesiculosa was first mentioned and illustrated in 1691 by Leonard Plukenet, based on collections made in India. He named the plant Lenticula palustris Indica. The modern botanical name originates from Gaetano Lorenzo Monti, who described Italian specimens in 1747 and named them Aldrovandia vesiculosa in honor of the Italian naturalist Ulisse Aldrovandi. When Carl Linnaeus published his Species Plantarum in 1753, the "i" was dropped from the name (an apparent copying error) to form the modern binomial.

== Infraspecific taxa ==
- Aldrovanda vesiculosa var. rubescens A.Cross and L.Adamec (2012)
- Aldrovanda vesiculosa var. aquitanica Durieu ex Diels (1906) nom. illeg.
- Aldrovanda vesiculosa var. australis Darwin (1876) nom. illeg.
- Aldrovanda vesiculosa var. duriaei Caspary (1859) nom. illeg.
- Aldrovanda vesiculosa var. verticillata (Roxb.) Darwin (1876) nom. illeg.

== Gallery ==
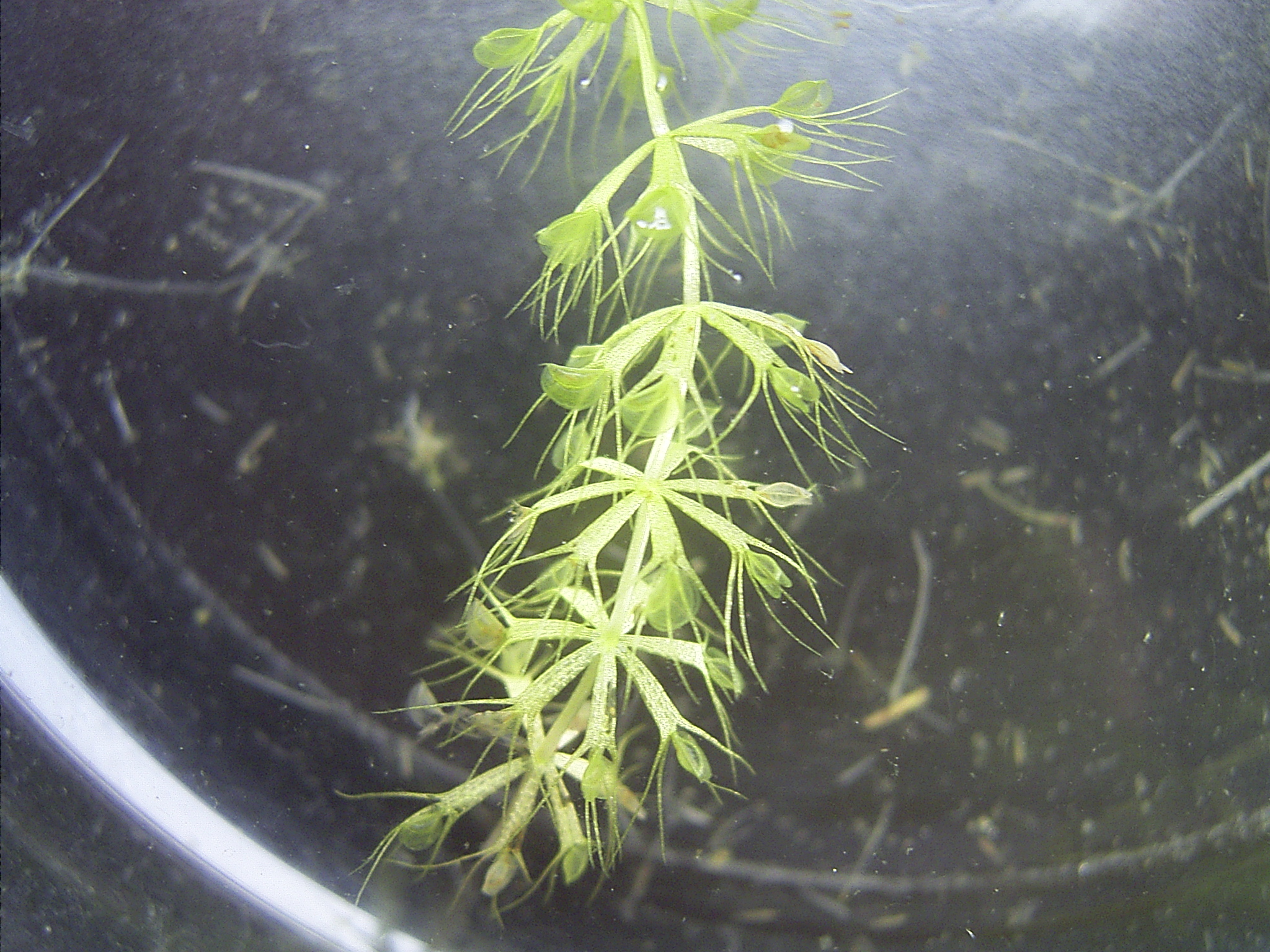

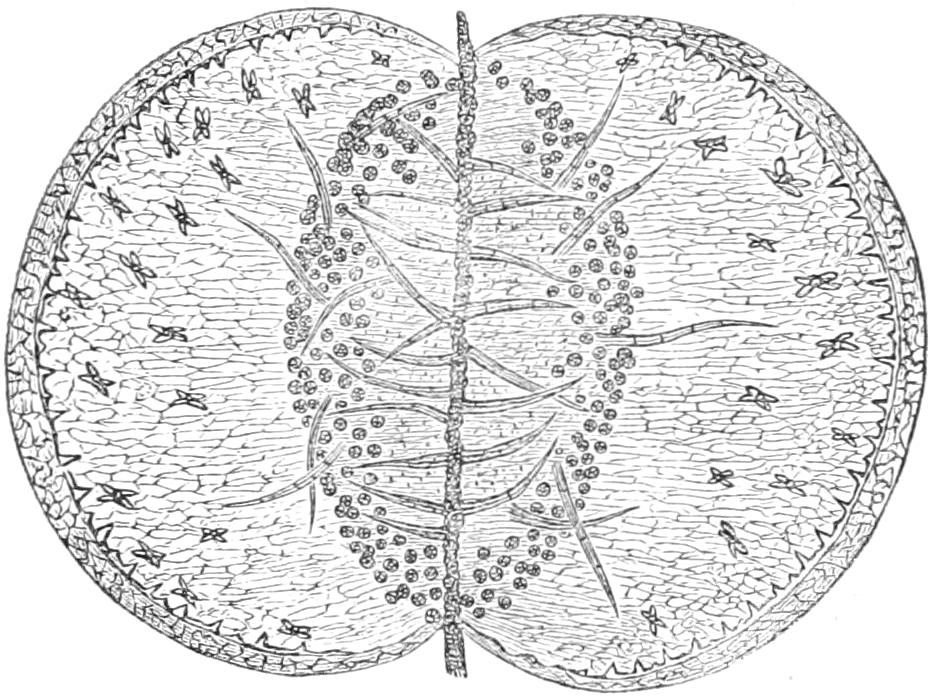

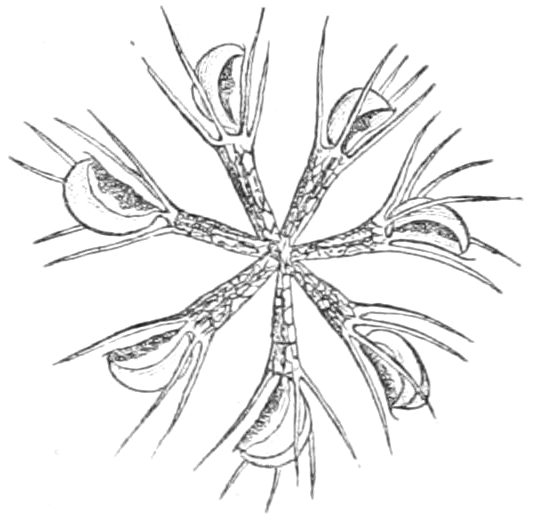

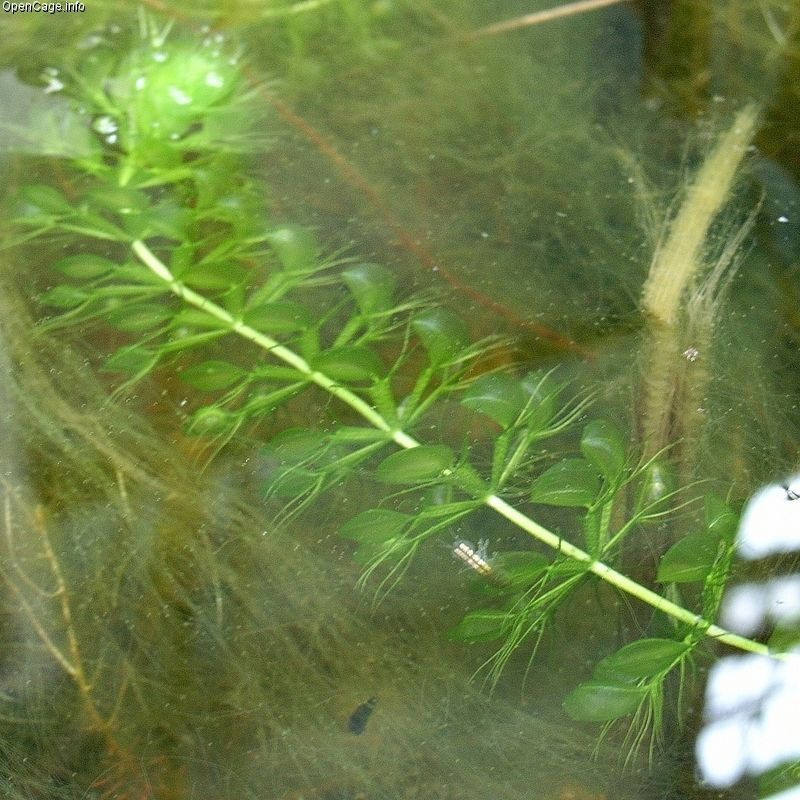

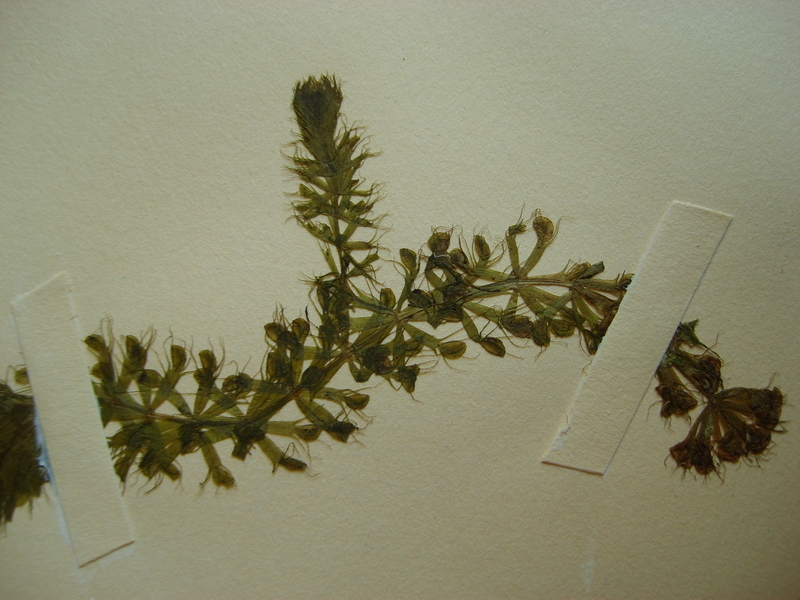

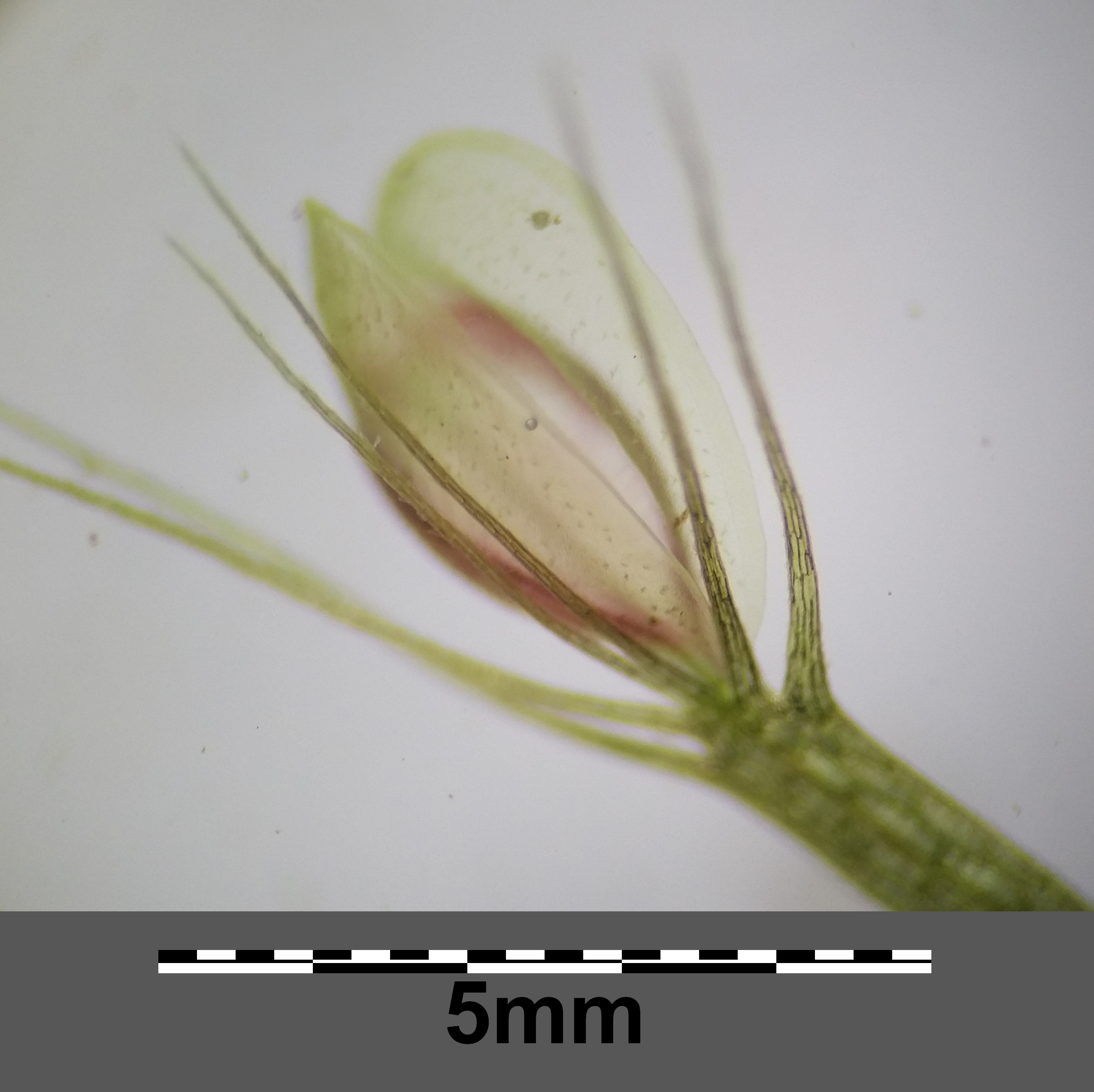

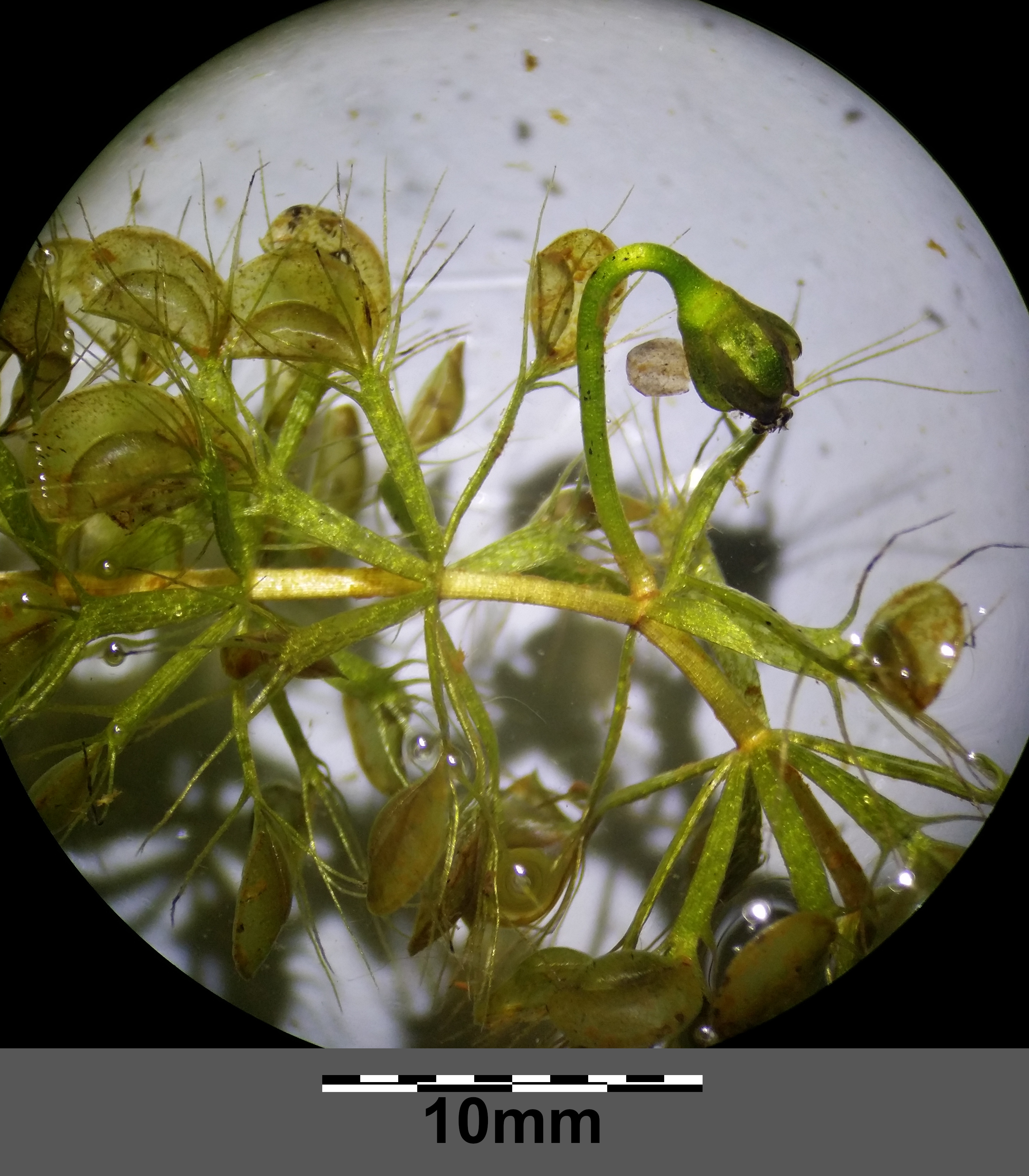

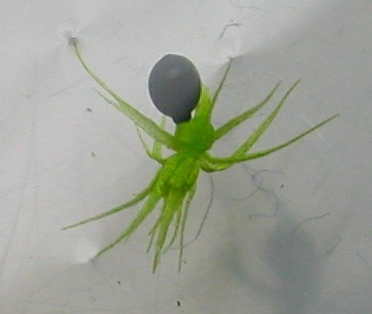

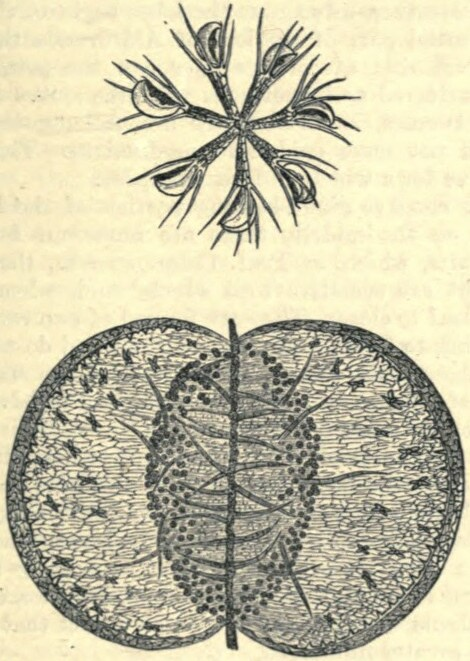

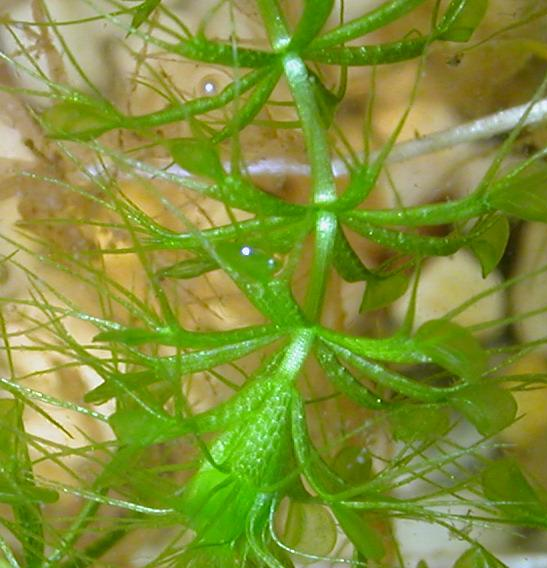

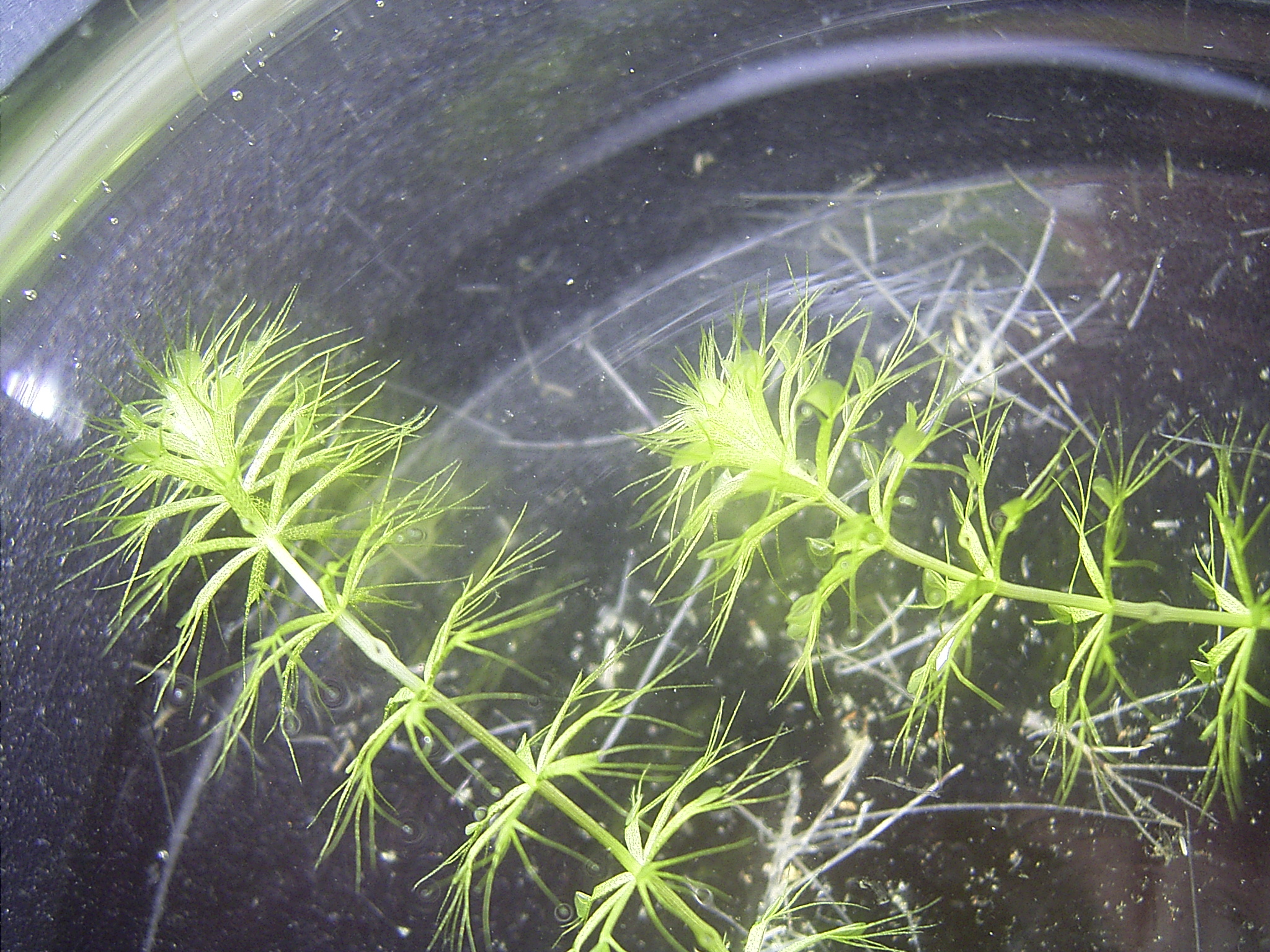

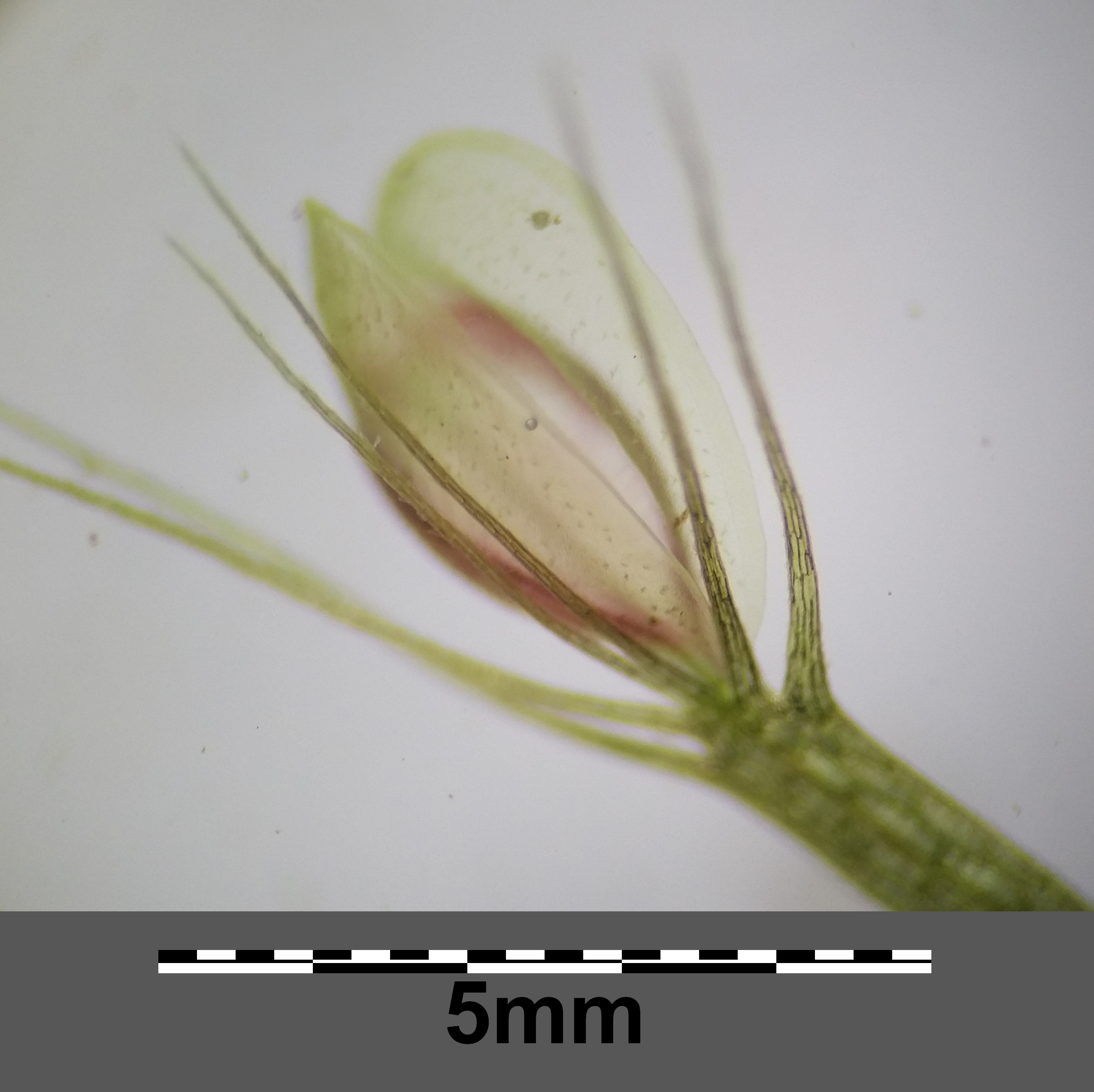

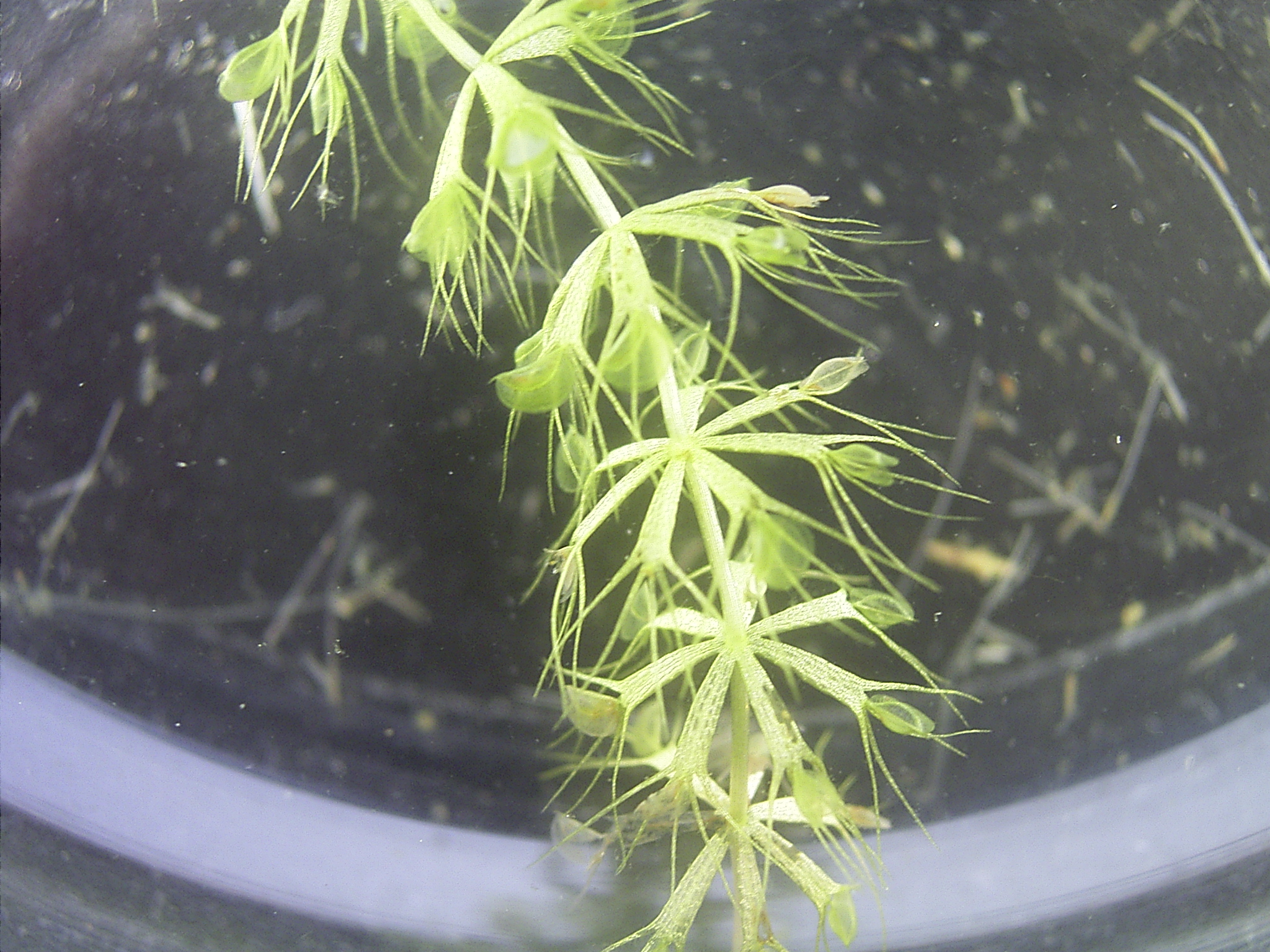

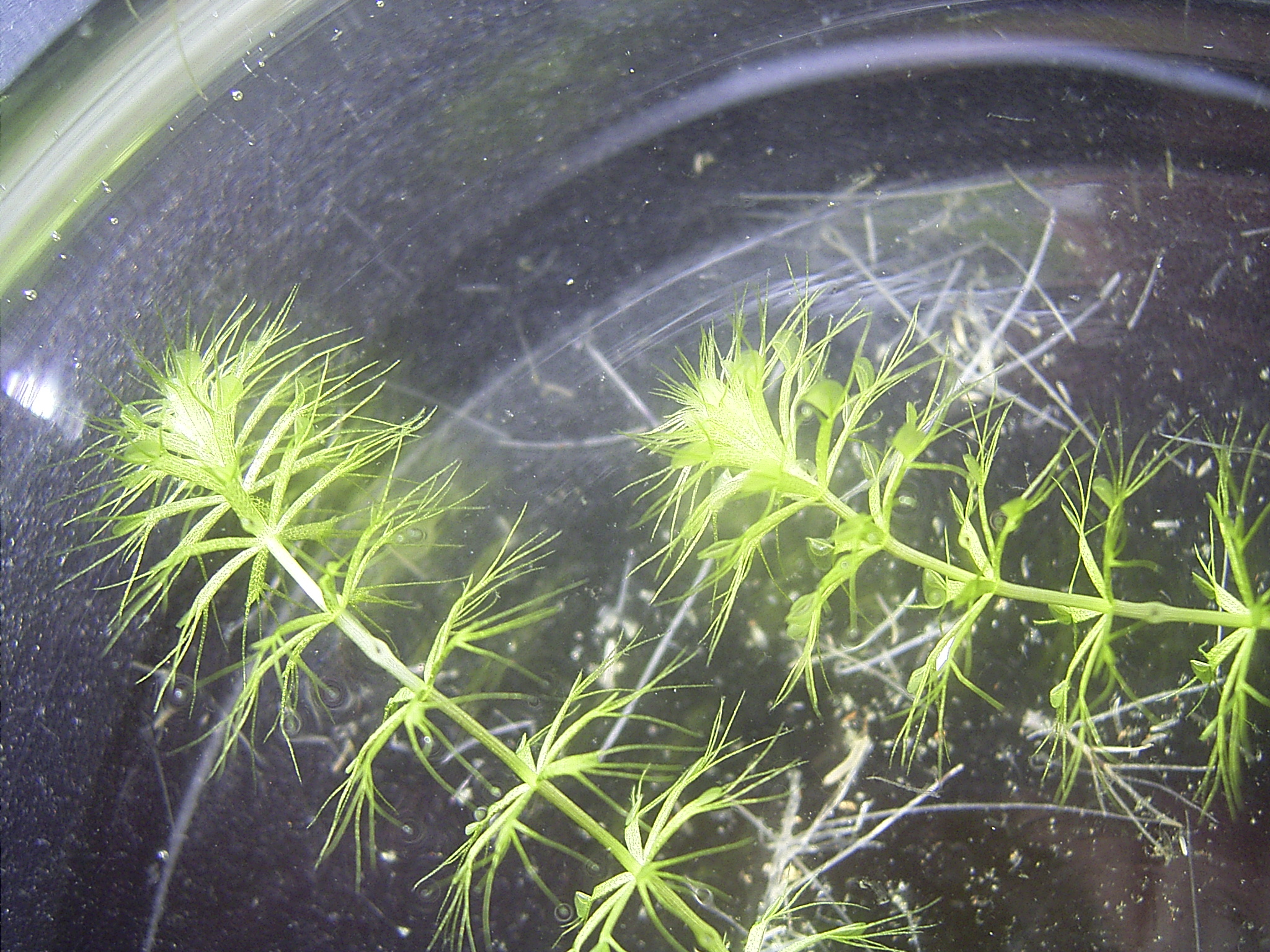

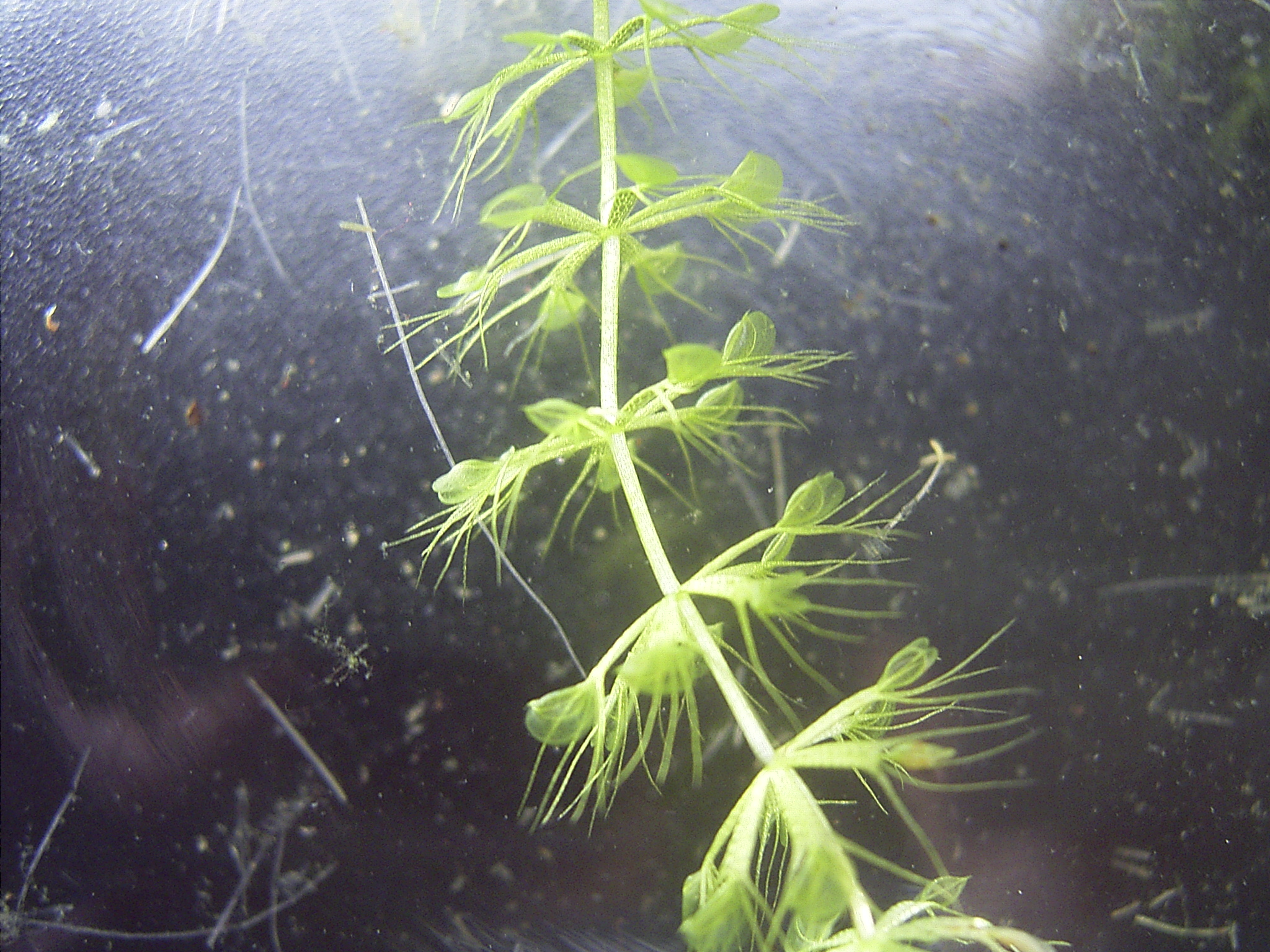

== See also ==
- Carnivorous plant
- Bladderwort
- Chondrocladia concrescens
