= Saxonipollis =

Saxonipollis Temporal range: Eocene

Scientific classification
- Kingdom: Plantae
- Clade: Tracheophytes
- Clade: Angiosperms
- Clade: Eudicots
- Order: Caryophyllales
- Family: Droseraceae
- Genus: †Saxonipollis; Krutzsch (1970)
- Species: †S. saxonicus

Binomial name
- †Saxonipollis saxonicus Krutzsch (1970)

Extinct genus of carnivorous plants

Saxonipollis saxonicus is an extinct plant species. It was possibly carnivorous. It is known only from fossilised pollen found in Eocene deposits of East Germany.

Saxonipollis saxonicus was possibly a precursor to Aldrovanda, or a close relative to its precursor.
