= Droserapites =

Droserapites Temporal range: Miocene

Scientific classification
- Kingdom: Plantae
- Clade: Tracheophytes
- Clade: Angiosperms
- Clade: Eudicots
- Order: Caryophyllales
- Family: Droseraceae (?)
- Genus: †Droserapites; Huang (1978)
- Species: †D. clavatus

Binomial name
- †Droserapites clavatus Huang (1978)

Extinct genus of carnivorous plants

Droserapites is a genus of extinct plants of somewhat uncertain droseracean affinity. It is a form taxon known only from fossil pollen.

Droserapites pollen grains are united in tetrads (groups of four). Individual grains are inaperturate. The exine is mixed with dense, superposed clavate and baculate processes, whereas the sexine is reticulate.

Pollen of D. clavatus has been found in the Miocene Peliao Sandstone of Taiwan. It generally matches that of extant Drosera in morphology. In his formal description of the genus, Tseng-Chieng Huang suggested that Droserapites may be related to Droseridites and Quadrisperites.

The tetrads of D. clavatus are tetrahedral and 34–40 μm in diameter. Individual grains are subspheroidal and measure 18–25 μm in width. They have a roughly circular amb that is abruptly acute at the distal pole. The exine is 0.5–1 μm thick, with 2–3 μm long clavae or bacula.
