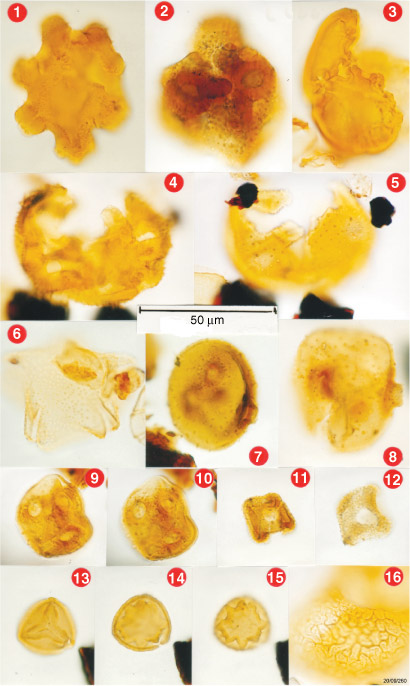
- Photomicrographs of Fischeripollis pollen (1–5) taken at 788× magnification

Scientific classification
- Kingdom: Plantae
- Clade: Tracheophytes
- Clade: Angiosperms
- Clade: Eudicots
- Order: Caryophyllales
- Family: Droseraceae
- Genus: †Fischeripollis; Muller (1981)

Species
- Fischeripollis sp. A Truswell & Macphail; Fischeripollis halensis Truswell & Marchant (1986); Fischeripollis krutschei Muller (1981); Fischeripollis undulatus

= Fischeripollis =

Fischeripollis Temporal range: Eocene

Extinct genus of carnivorous plants

Fischeripollis is a genus of extinct plants in the family Droseraceae. Several species have been formally described and another has been temporarily designated Fischeripollis sp. A.

F. halensis was described based on fossilised pollen from sediments in the Hale Basin of central Australia, dated to the middle-late Eocene (48 to 34 million years ago). F. krutschei was discovered in Saxony, Germany. F. undulatus was also native to Europe.
