= Droserapollis =

Droserapollis Temporal range: Paleocene–Miocene

Scientific classification
- Kingdom: Plantae
- Clade: Tracheophytes
- Clade: Angiosperms
- Clade: Eudicots
- Order: Caryophyllales
- Family: Droseraceae
- Genus: †Droserapollis; Krutzsch (1970)

Species
- Droserapollis gemmatus Huang (1978); Droserapollis khasiensis Kumar (1995); Droserapollis lusaticus Krutzsch (1959); Droserapollis taiwanensis Shaw (1999)

Extinct genus of carnivorous plants

Droserapollis is a genus of extinct plants in the family Droseraceae. It is a form taxon known only from fossil pollen.

Droserapollis pollen grains are united in tetrahedral tetrads (groups of four). Individual grains are possibly porate-like. The exine is mixed with gemmate and short baculate processes, whereas the sexine is granulate.

Poorly preserved pollen of D. gemmatus has been found in the Miocene Yutengping Sandstone of Taiwan, whereas that of D. khasiensis originates from the Paleocene Lakadong Sandstone of Laitryngew, Khasi Hills, Meghalaya, India. In addition, palynomorphs from Germany have also been assigned to the genus.

Droserapollis pollen matches that of extant Drosera in morphology. The tetrads of D. gemmatus are 53–56 μm in deter. Individual grains are prolate and measure 35–40 by 25–26 μm. The exine is 1.5–2.4 μm thick, with 1–2 μm long gemmae or bacula.
