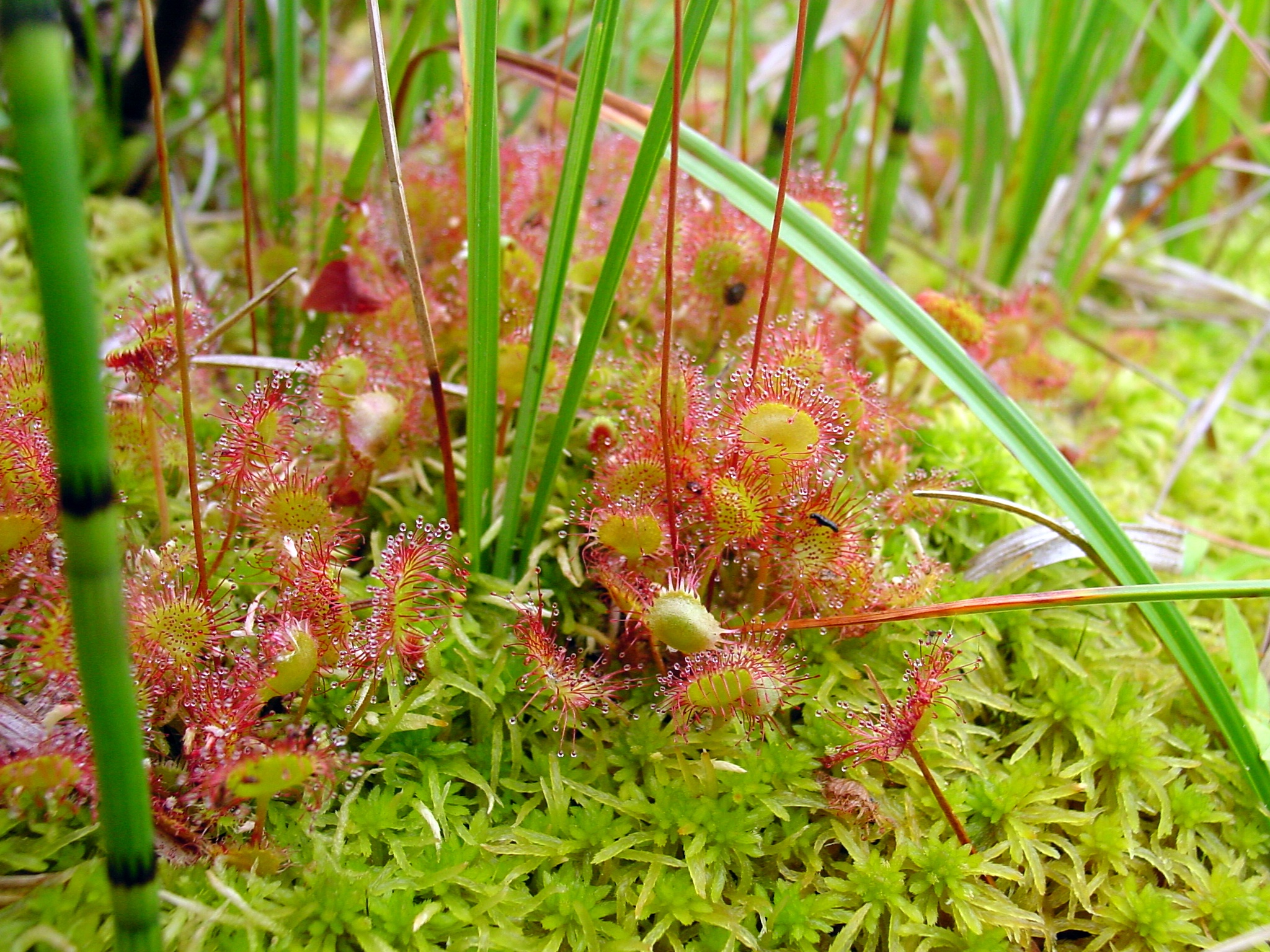
- Drosera rotundifolia in habitat in Oregon

Scientific classification
- Kingdom: Plantae
- Clade: Embryophytes
- Clade: Tracheophytes
- Clade: Spermatophytes
- Clade: Angiosperms
- Clade: Eudicots
- Order: Caryophyllales
- Family: Droseraceae; Salisb.

Genera
- Aldrovanda; Dionaea; Drosera; †?Droserapollis; †?Droserapites; †?Droseridites; †?Fischeripollis; †?Palaeoaldrovanda; †?Saxonipollis

= Droseraceae =

Droseraceae Temporal range: Late Cretaceous–Recent

Family of carnivorous flowering plants

Droseraceae is a family of carnivorous flowering plants, also known as the sundew family. It consists of approximately 180 species in three extant genera, the vast majority being in the sundew genus Drosera. The family also contains the well-known Venus flytrap (Dionaea muscipula) and the more obscure waterwheel plant (Aldrovanda vesiculosa), both of which are the only living species of their respective genera. Representatives of the Droseraceae are found on all continents except Antarctica.

== Description ==
Droseraceae are carnivorous herbaceous plants that may be annuals or perennials. Their leaves are alternate and adaxially circinate, with at least one leaf surface containing hairs with mucilage-producing glands at the tip. Their flowers are bisexual, usually with three carpels and five sepals, petals and stamens. Their pollen grains are triporate or multiporate and released in tetrads. Despite being carnivorous, their flowers are insect-pollinated, typically with white to purple flowers that close at night. They produce small seeds that are dispersed by wind and water.

Most of the members of Droseraceae are contained in the genus Drosera, the sundews. Both Dionaea and Aldrovanda have only one extant species. Drosera species trap prey by secreting a sticky substance from hairs on their leaves. Dionaea and Aldrovanda both use snap-traps that close rapidly when the leaves are disturbed. Dionaea is terrestrial, while Aldrovanda is strictly aquatic. Like carnivorous plants of other families, the Droseraceae are able to supplement their nutrient intake, especially that of nitrogen, by capturing and digesting small animals such as insects. In this way, these plants are able to thrive in nutrient-deficient areas, such as sphagnum bogs.

=== Drosera ===
Drosera is one of the largest genera of carnivorous plants, and individual species vary extensively in their specific morphology. Common to all members of Drosera are highly modified leaves lined with tentacle-like glandular trichomes. At the end of each trichome, a bead of highly viscous mucilage is secreted, which resembles a drop of dew. The mucilage is a fairly pure aqueous solution of acidic polysaccharides with high molecular weights, which makes the mucilage not only highly viscous, but also very sticky, so much so, a single drop of mucilage may be stretched to lengths of up to a meter and cover one million times its original surface area. Insects and other prey animals are attracted by the smell of this mucilage and become stuck in it. Such snares are termed "flypaper traps", but the trapping mechanism of sundews is often erroneously described as "passive". In fact, sundew traps are quite active and sensitive, and the disturbance of one or a few trichomes quickly triggers an action potential that stimulates the rapid movement of other trichomes toward the prey. The leaf then curls in on itself, enveloping the prey for digestion.

Four Drosera subgenera are recognized today: subgenus Regiae and subgenus Arcturia are each monotypic (D. regia and D. arcturi, respectively), and the remaining Drosera are divided into two clades, subgenus Ergaleium and subgenus Drosera.

=== Dionaea ===
Dionaea muscipula, better known as the Venus flytrap, is a globally famous carnivorous plant and according to Charles Darwin, "one of the most wonderful in the world." The leaves of Dionaea are also highly modified and form a "snap-trap" that quickly shuts when a stimulus is detected. Three large trichomes extend outward on the inner surface of the trap. Two of these three hairs must be stimulated within a certain amount of time to trigger the trap. The trap closes as the result of a flipping of the trap lobes from a position where the exterior of the trap is concave to one where the exterior is convex. This movement can begin as soon as 0.4 seconds after stimulation and can be completed after one second.

=== Aldrovanda ===
Aldrovanda vesiculosa, also called the waterwheel plant, is a free-floating, rootless, aquatic plant. It is less well-known than its relative Dionaea muscipula, but the two have similar trap structures. In 1875, Darwin described Aldrovanda as "a miniature aquatic Dionaea". The trap of Aldrovanda is aquatic and is smaller and faster than that of Dionaea. In addition, while two stimuli are required to close a trap in Dionaea, only one is required in Aldrovanda. The trap of Aldrovanda closes about ten times faster than that of Dionaea.

== Etymology ==
The type genus for the Droseraceae is Drosera, which was described and named by Linnaeus in 1753. The name was derived from the Greek word "droseros", meaning "dewy" or "drops of water". The Principia Botanica, published in 1787, states "Sun-dew (Drosera) derives its name from small drops of a liquor-like dew, hanging on its fringed leaves, and continuing in the hottest part of the day, exposed to the sun."

== Phylogeny ==
In 1867, Bentham and Hooker placed six genera in the Droseraceae: Dionaea, Aldrovanda, Drosera, Drosophyllum, Byblis, and Roridula. Although these genera had significant differences in leaf and flower morphologies, they were grouped together on the basis of insect traps that appeared to be homologous. In 1922, Byblis and Roridula were moved into a new family, the Byblidaceae (and later further split out, forming the Roridulaceae). In the 1990s, both morphological and molecular evidence began to build that Drosophyllum differed from the other genera in the Droseraceae, Drosophyllum, another monotypic genus (Drosophyllum lusitanicum being the only species), exhibits a flypaper-type trap similar to those of Drosera, but Drosophyllum does not actively curl its leaves to envelop captured prey animals. This important morphological distinction led researchers to question the validity of this taxon's placement in Droseraceae. Other significant trait differences in Drosophyllum include pollen structure, trichome anatomy, and a woody stem with a deep taproot. Ultimately, Drosophyllum was shown to be more closely related to the carnivorous liana Triphyophyllum and the noncarnivorous liana Ancistrocladus, and is, thus, classified elsewhere (to be specific, its own monotypic family Drosophyllaceae). and APG III (2009) placed it into its own family, the Drosophyllaceae. This left only the three genera (Dionaea, Aldrovanda, Drosera) that are classified as Droseraceae today.

Despite some debate, taxonomists have tended to include at least two of these three genera, and, in general, all three, in this family since at least 1906. Separate families for Dionaea and Aldrovanda have been proposed in the past. These were Dionaecae, proposed in 1933, and Aldrovandaceae, proposed in 1949. Ultimately, molecular and morphological evidence support the inclusion of all three, confirming that the Droseraceae are a monophyletic group. Molecular evidence also shows that the two genera with traps that snap shut (Dionaea and Aldrovanda) are more closely related to each other than to Drosera, suggesting snap traps evolved only once.

The family Droseraceae is part of the order Caryophyllales in the Superasterid clade within the core eudicots. The family totals nearly 200 species. Caryophyllales are divided into two major suborders: Caryophyllineae, which contains the "core" Caryophyllales, such as Cactaceae and Amaranthaceae and is sister to the Polygonineae – the "non-core" Caryophyllales. This non-core clade is where Droseraceae is placed.

Recent molecular and biochemical evidence suggests the carnivorous taxa in the order Caryophyllales (the families Droseraceae, Drosophyllaceae, Nepenthaceae, and the species Triphyophyllum peltatum) all belong to the same clade, which does not consist only of carnivorous plants, but also of some noncarnivorous plants such as those in the family Ancistrocladaceae.

The fossil record of Droseraceae is the richest of any carnivorous plant family. Fossil pollen has been attributed to several extant, as well as extinct, genera, although some are of questionable validity.

== Evolution ==
Darwin concluded that carnivory in plants was convergent, writing in 1875 that Utricularia and Nepenthes were not "at all related to the Droseraceae". This remained a subject of debate for over a century. In 1960, Leon Croizat concluded that carnivory was monophyletic, and placed all the carnivorous plants together at the base of the angiosperms. Molecular studies over the past 30 years have led to a wide consensus that Darwin was correct, with studies showing that carnivory evolved at least six times in the angiosperms, and that trap designs such as pitcher traps and flypaper traps are analogous rather than homologous.

The origin of carnivory within the ancestors of the Droseraceae has been dated to 85.6 million years ago, with the evolution of snap-traps dated to 48 million years ago. Researchers have hypothesized that carnivory in the Droseraceae began with simple flypaper traps, followed by movement of tentacles in some Drosera-like species, followed by movement of leaves, leading eventually to the development of snap-traps in Dionaea and Aldrovanda by increasing the speed of the leaf movements and altering the morphology of the leaves. Due to the sister relationship of Dionaea and Aldrovanda, it is likely that the snap-trap mechanism only evolved once, but it is unknown if the common ancestor was terrestrial or aquatic.

== Gallery ==
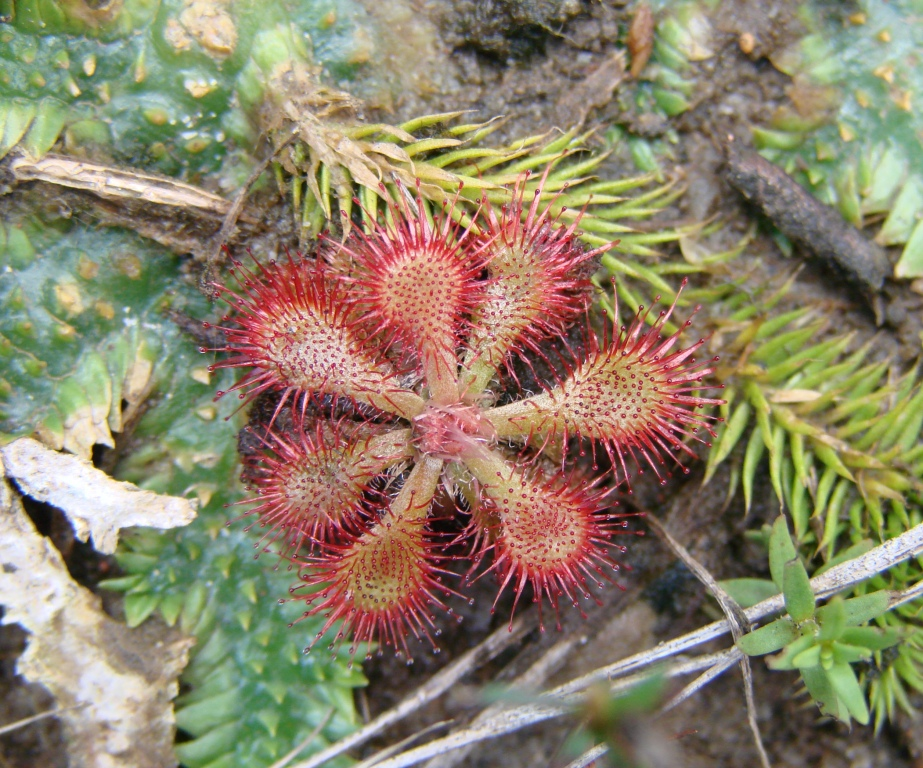
Drosera communis

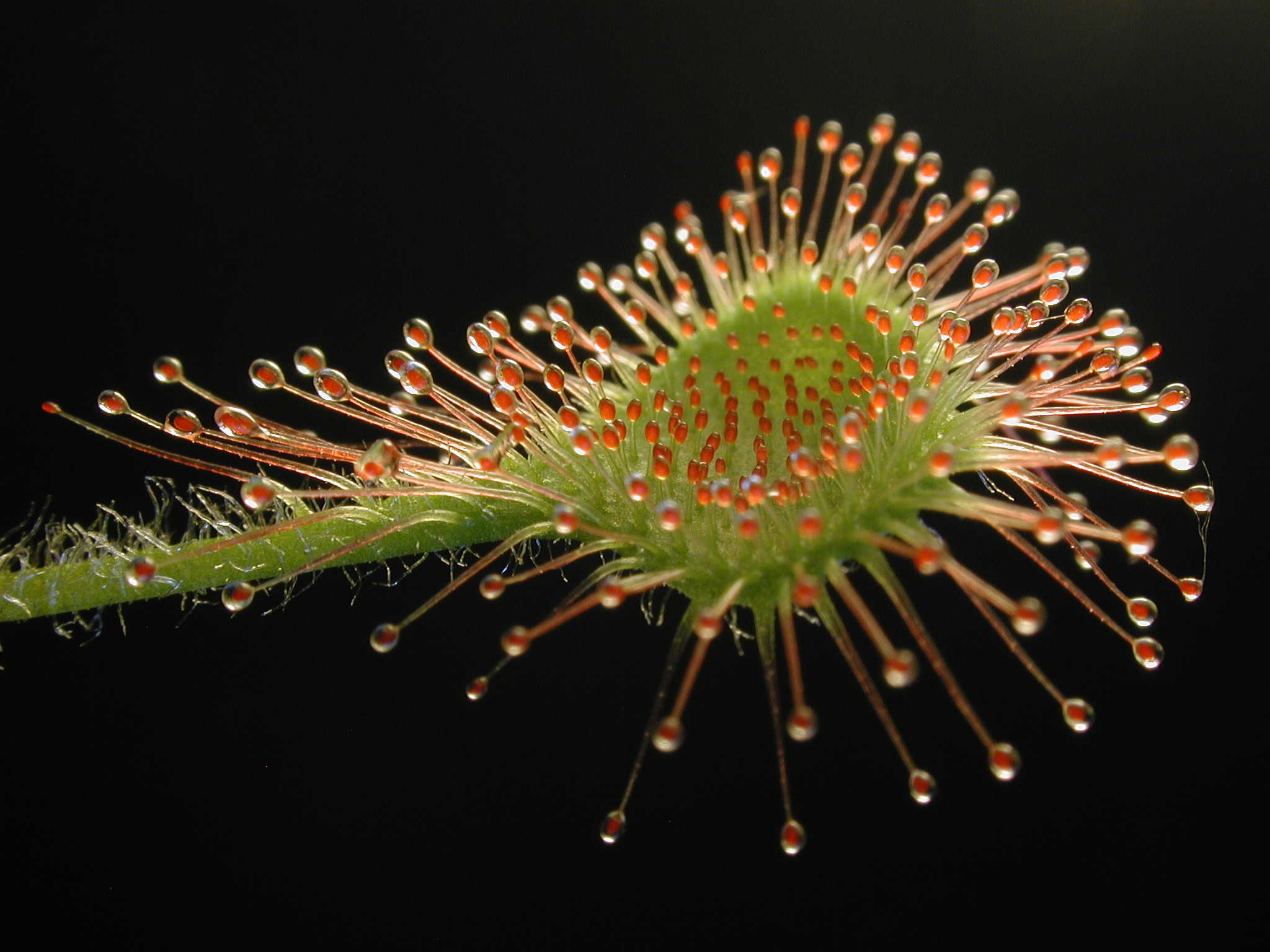
Drosera rotundifolia

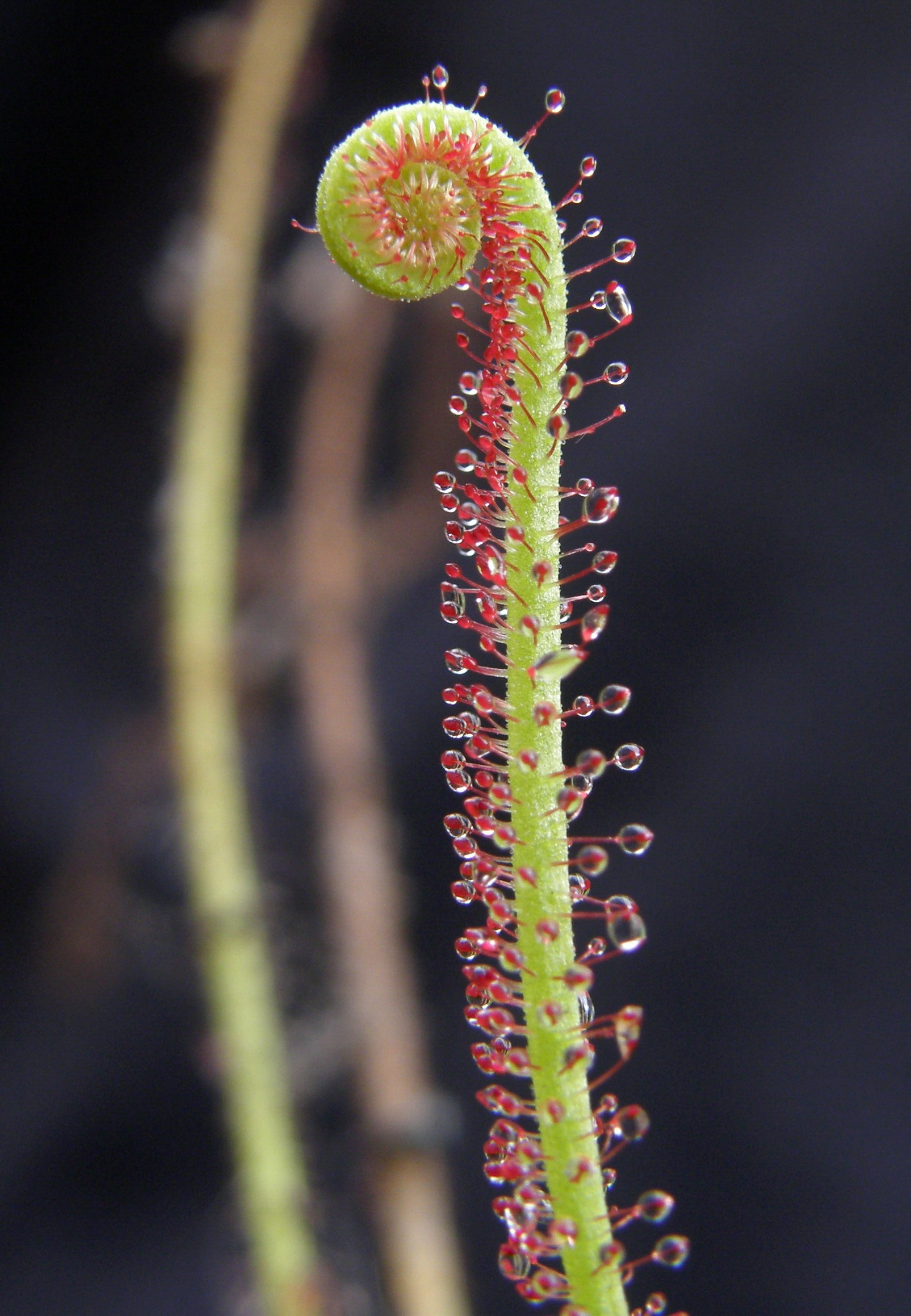
Drosera filiformis

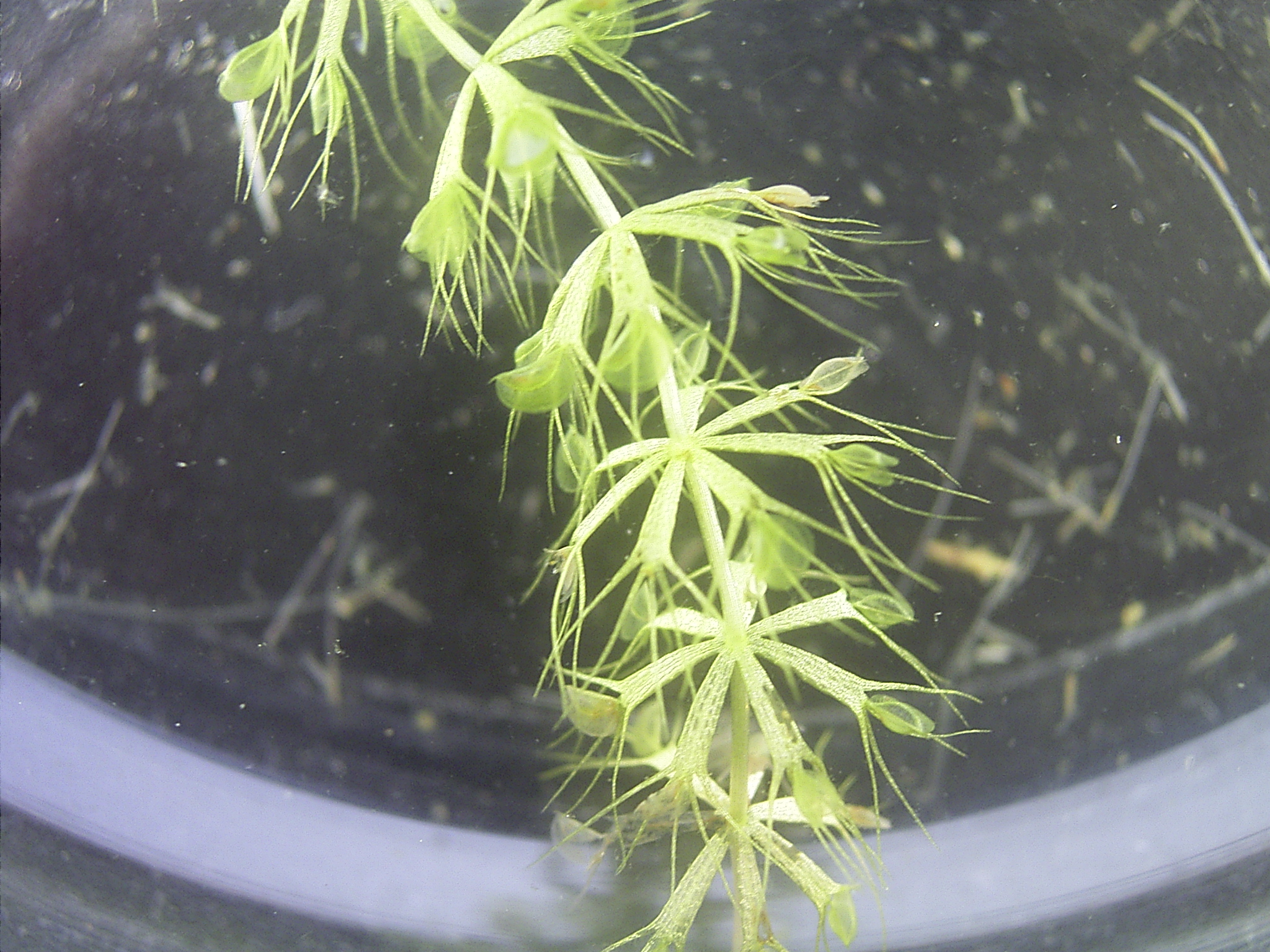
Aldrovanda vesiculosa

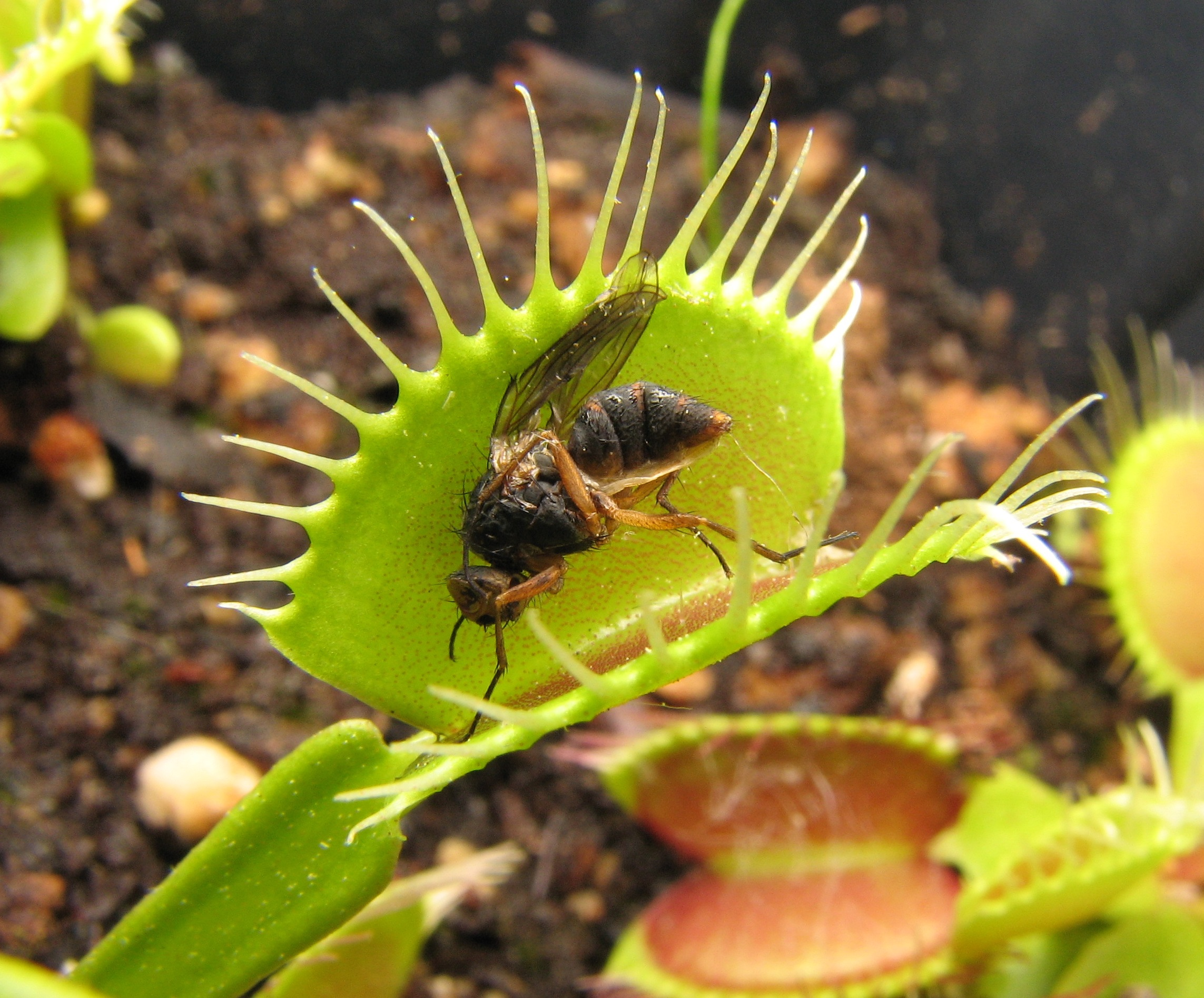
Dionaea muscipula
