= Turion (botany) =

Plant bud

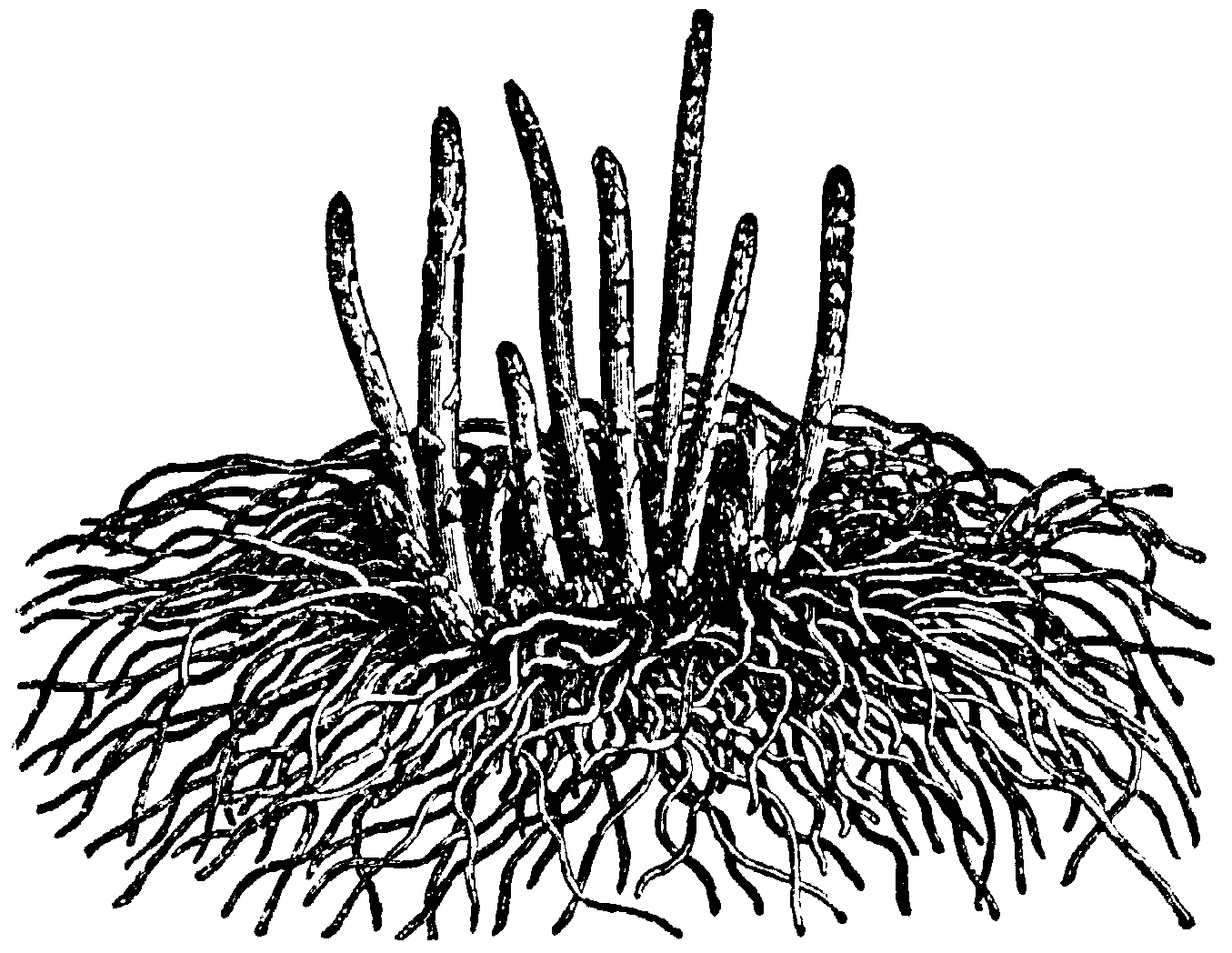
Asparagus shoots grow from turions rather than directly from the main stem of the plant

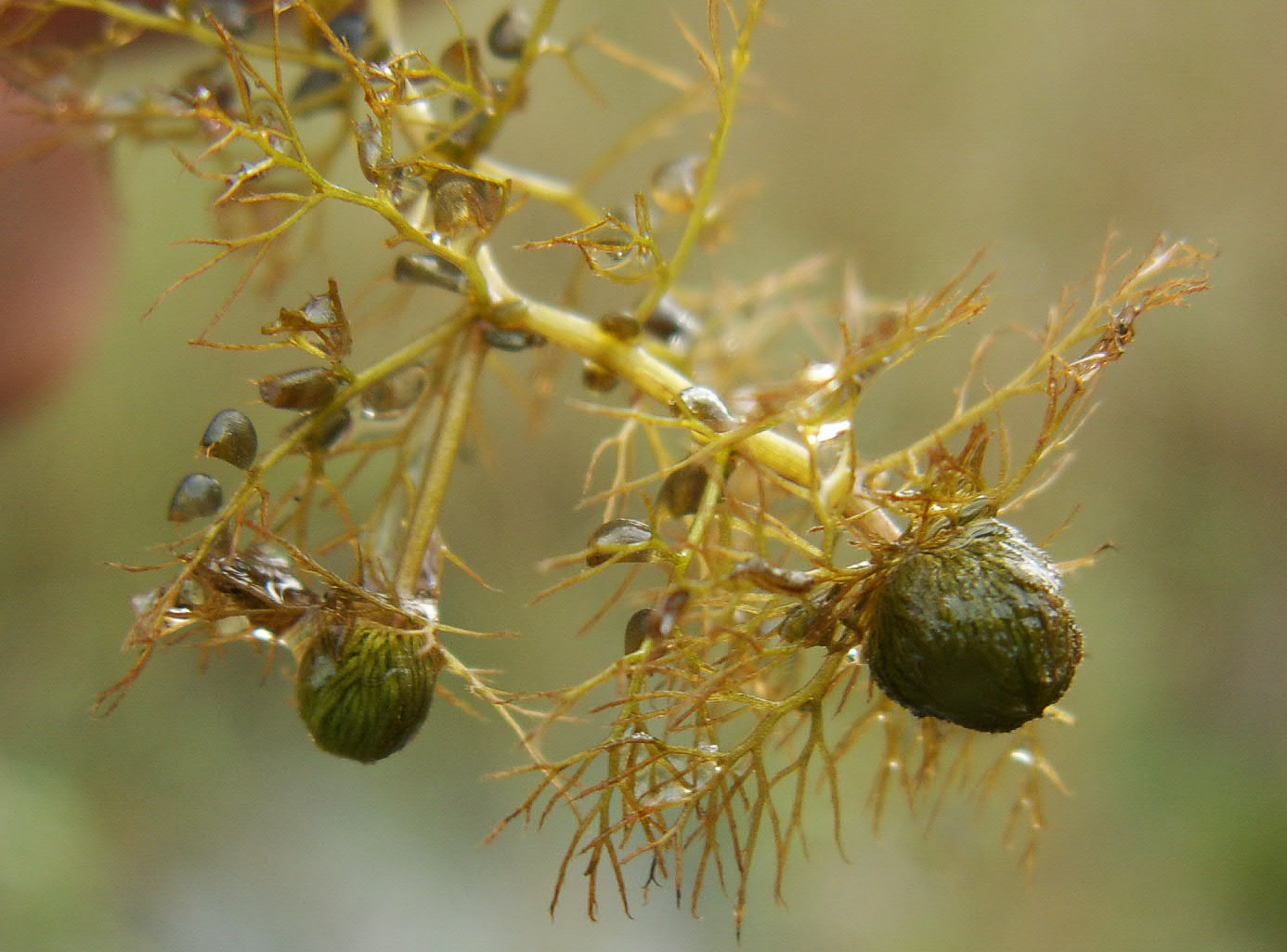
Turions of Utricularia vulgaris

A turion (from Latin turio meaning "shoot") is a type of bud that is capable of growing into a complete plant. A turion may be an underground bud. Many members of the genus Epilobium are known to produce turions at or below ground level.

Some aquatic plant species produce overwintering turions, especially in the genera Potamogeton, Myriophyllum, Aldrovanda and Utricularia. These plants produce turions in response to unfavourable conditions such as decreasing day-length or reducing temperature.

They are derived from modified shoot apices and are often rich in starch and sugars enabling them to act as storage organs. Although they are hardy (frost resistant), it is probable that their principal adaptation is their ability to sink to the bottom of a pond or lake when the water freezes. Because water expands anomalously at lower temperatures, water at 4 °C (39 °F) is denser than colder water, and thus stays at the bottom of the pond or lake. Turions overwinter in this denser, warmer water before rising again in the spring. Some turions of aquatic plants such as Potamogeton crispus also exhibit drought resistance, allowing them to survive in temporary pools.

== See also ==
- Bulbils, which may resemble turions, but include specialized storage leaves
- Hibernaculum (botany)
