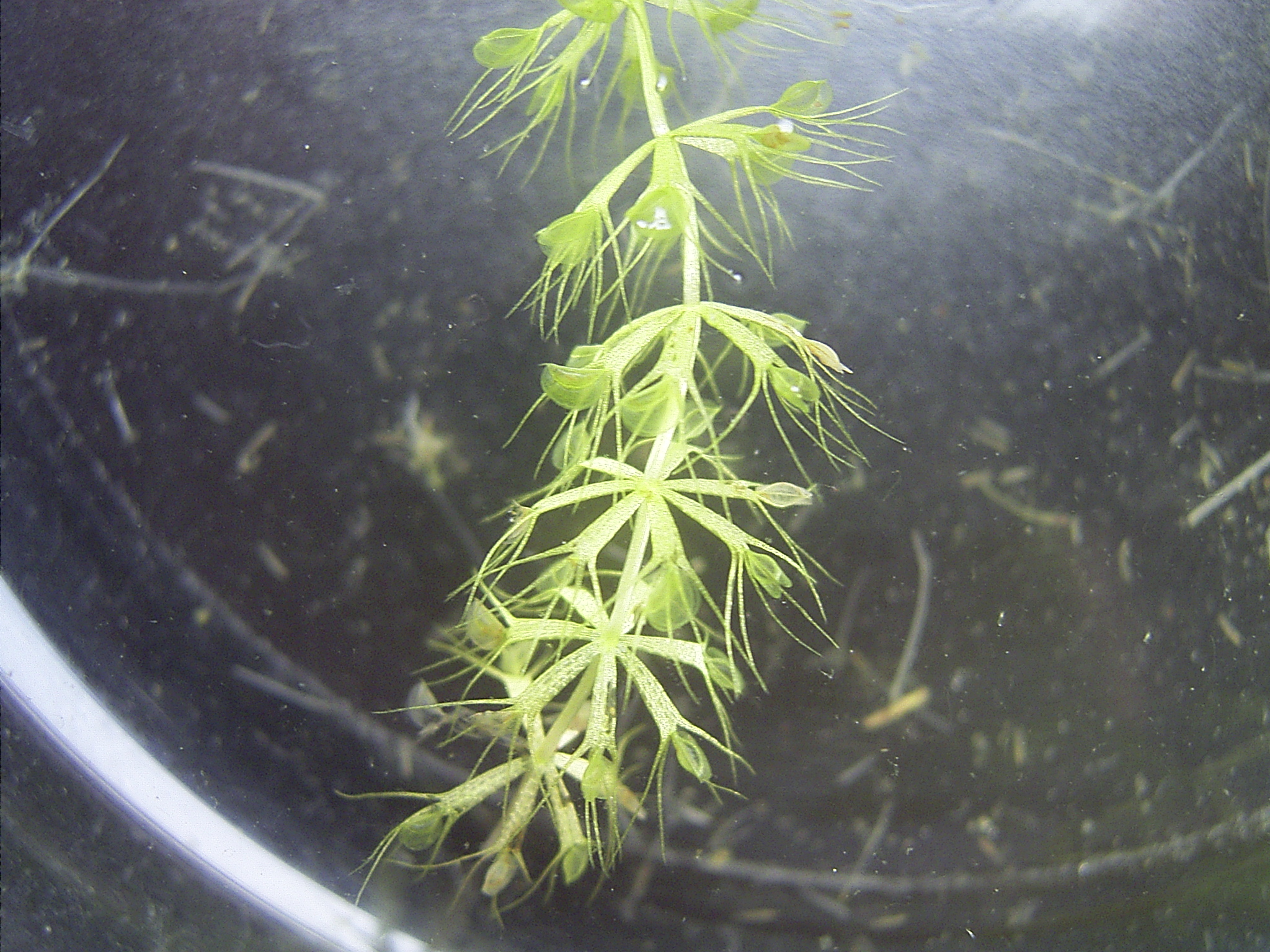
- Aldrovanda vesiculosa

Scientific classification
- Kingdom: Plantae
- Clade: Tracheophytes
- Clade: Angiosperms
- Clade: Eudicots
- Order: Caryophyllales
- Family: Droseraceae
- Genus: Aldrovanda; L.

Synonyms
- Drosera aldrovanda F.Muell., superfluous name; Aldrovanda verticillata Roxb.; Aldrovanda generalis E.H.L.Krause

= Aldrovanda =

Aldrovanda Temporal range: Paleocene - Recent

Genus of carnivorous plants

Aldrovanda /ˌældrəˈvændə/ is a genus of carnivorous plants encompassing one extant species: the waterwheel plant (Aldrovanda vesiculosa). It also covers numerous extinct taxa. The genus is named in honor of the Italian naturalist Ulisse Aldrovandi, the founder of the Botanical Garden of Bologna, Orto Botanico dell'Università di Bologna. Aldrovanda vesiculosa primary habitat is shallow standing waters with humic elements. It has been reported from scattered locations in Europe, Asia, Africa, and Australia.

== Description ==
The waterwheel is a small, free floating and rootless aquatic plant. It was given its nickname due to the leaf whorls that span the length of the plant. It has a length of about 1.5 to 20 cm (9/16 to 7 7/8 in), and whorls of about 1 to 2 cm (3/8 to 13/16 in) in diameter. At every 3 to 4 cm the plant branches, sometimes forming offshoots. An average of 12 to 19 whorls spans the length of the plant, each with about 5 to 9 leaves, each up to 11mm long. The growth is faster than terrestrial carnivorous plants, sometimes growing about 4 to 9 mm a day.

In temperate regions the plant goes dormant in the winter, forming turions of about 4–6 mm (3/16–1/4 in) and sinking to the bottom. In tropical regions, the plant grows all year long without forming turions. The plant flourishes primarily in warmer regions with temperatures higher than 25 °C (77 °F), producing up to 200 offspring in a growth season. It produces one flower of white or light green, that arises above the surface for only a day. In temperate regions, the plant reproduces mostly via asexual means, producing inviable seeds or no flower at all.

The leaf structure is very similar to the Dionaea (commonly known as the Venus flytrap), the main difference being air chambers present in the "stem". The traps, at the end of the leaf, contain up to six bristles, analogous to Dionaea teeth, that prevent debris from activating the trap. Each trap contains an additional 60–80 smaller "teeth", and circa 30–40 trigger hairs inside. The speed of closing is about 0.01 to 0.02 seconds.

=== Trap mechanism ===
The trap mechanism is akin to that present in Dionaea—Darwin even named it "the miniature aquatic Dionaea". The mechanism by which the trap snaps shut involves a complex interaction between elasticity, turgor and growth. In the open, untripped state, the lobes are convex (bent outwards), but in the closed state, the lobes are concave (forming a cavity). It is the rapid flipping of this bistable state that closes the trap, but the mechanism by which this occurs is still poorly understood. When the trigger hairs are stimulated, an action potential (mostly involving calcium ions—see calcium in biology) is generated, which propagates across the lobes and stimulates cells in the lobes and in the midrib between them.

=== Diet and Digestion ===
Waterwheel plants primarily prey on zooplankton. The trigger hairs inside the trap look similar to algae, and are said to attract small grazing crustaceans into the trap to eat.

To digest their prey, Aldrovanda and have specialized digestive glands that release lytic enzymes. These enzymes are used to break down the prey and take in its nutrients. The digestive glands of carnivorous plants are highly specialized to transport nutrients both to and from the traps.

== Extinct relatives ==
The extinct species are known only from fossil pollen and seeds, with the exception of A. inopinata, which is also known from fossilised laminae. Aldrovanda was for a long time thought to be related to the Late Cretaceous form taxon Palaeoaldrovanda splendens, but research published in 2010 suggests that remains attributed to Palaeoaldrovanda actually represent fossilised insect eggs.

== Evolution ==
The organ of carnivory in Aldrovanda is the snap trap. Snap traps are only found in one other carnivorous plant genus, Dionaea. The two genera have been shown to share a most recent common ancestor by analysis of combined nuclear and chloroplast DNA sequences. When sequences of chloroplast DNA of Aldrovanda, Dionaea, and Drosera were analyzed alone, however, Aldrovanda and Drosera (sundews) were shown to share a most recent common ancestor. It has been proposed that this discrepancy between gene trees based on nuclear and cytoplasmic DNA analyses can be explained by chloroplast capture, as similar inconsistencies have been explained by this phenomenon.

== Conservation ==
Aldrovanda vesiculosa is listed as "Endangered" on the IUCN Red List. It is native to Europe, Asia, Africa, and Australia, but is considered extinct in much of its native range, primarily due to eutrophication. Despite being endangered in its native range, it was introduced in the U.S. and has been reported to be rapidly spreading in the waters of the Catskill Mountains of New York, USA, where it is being evaluated as a potentially problematic invasive species.

== Species ==
- †Aldrovanda borysthenica
- †Aldrovanda clavata
- †Aldrovanda dokturovskyi
- †Aldrovanda eleanorae
- †Aldrovanda europaea
- †Aldrovanda inopinata
- †Aldrovanda intermedia
- †Aldrovanda kuprianovae
- †Aldrovanda megalopolitana
- †Aldrovanda nana
- †Aldrovanda ovata
- †Aldrovanda praevesiculosa
- †Aldrovanda rugosa
- †Aldrovanda sibirica
- †Aldrovanda sobolevii
- †Aldrovanda unica
- Aldrovanda vesiculosa
- †Aldrovanda zussii

Several undescribed species are also known.

The distinctions between the various named species have been criticised, although SEM analysis of the seed structures seems to confirm the existence of different species.
