= 1997 Shanghai International Film Festival =

Chinese film festival

The 3rd Shanghai International Film Festival was held between October 24 and December 2, 1997. The Film Festival was divided into four activities:

- Golden Cup International Film Competition
- International Film Panorama
- International Film and TV Market
- Retrospectives with Seminar

British film The Woodlanders won the Golden Goblet for best film.

== Jury ==
- Shi Fangyu (China)
- Keiko Matsuzaka (Japan)
- Im Kwon-taek (Korea)
- Elem Klimov (Russia)
- Mark Rydell (United States)
- István Szabó (Hungary)
- Ng See-Yuen (Hong Kong)

== In competition ==
Title	Director	Country
Actresses	Ventura Pons	Spain
Adam and Eve	Måns Herngren & Hannes Holm	Sweden
L'Appartement	Gilles Mimouni	France
Cherish His Smile	Iwao Seto	Japan
Dark Night of the Soul	Prasanna Vithanage	Sri Lanka
Elena's Redemption	Carlos Siguion-Reyna	Philippines
Gaston's War	Robbe De Hert	Belgium
Honey and Ashes	Nadia Fares	Switzerland
Julio and his Angel	Jorge Cervera	Mexico
Lamorte	Xaver Schwarzenberger	Austria
Live in Peace	Hu Bingliu	China
Mendel	Alexander Røsler	Norway
Paradise Road	Bruce Beresford	Australia/U.S.A
Red River Valley	Feng Xiaoning	China
Seen But Not Heard	Jacek Bromski	Poland
Shoemaker	Colleen Murphy	Canada
Three Seasons	Maria Iliou	Greece
Traveling Companion	Peter Del Monte	Italy
The Woodlanders	Phil Agland	United Kingdom

== Awards ==
=== Golden Goblet ===
- Best Film - The Woodlanders (dir. Phil Agland, United Kingdom)
- Best Director - Phil Agland for The Woodlanders (United Kingdom)
- Best Actor - Michel Piccoli for Traveling Companion (Italy)
- Best Actress - Pan Yu for Live at Peace (China)

=== Special Jury Award ===
- Mendel (dir. Alexander Rosler, Norway)
- Live in Peace (dir. Hu Binliu)
