= Iliou =

Iliou (Greek: Ηλιού) is a Greek surname. Notable people with this surname include:

- Ilias Iliou, Greek lawyer and politician
- Maria Iliou, Greek film director, scriptwriter and producer
- Philippos Iliou (1931–2004), Greek historian

== See also ==
- Iliu
