= Korup =

Ethnic group

Korup is an ethnic group of forest people located in Southwest Province of Cameroon and in the adjacent Cross River State of Nigeria. There are currently four Korup villages in the Cameroonian side: Erat (a.k.a. Ekon II), Ekon I, Ikondokondo (also spelled Ekundukundu) and Akpassang (a.k.a. Ikondokondo II). The largest village of all is Erat, with an approximate population of ~450, and it is located inside the Korup National Park - which has received its name from the Korup people inhabiting its forests. Ikondokondo used to be located inside the park, but in 2000 it was relocated in the park's support zone, north of the town of Mundemba. This is why Ikondokondo is nowadays also known as "the Resettlement". Akpassang and Ekon I are very close to, but outside, the park boundaries.

Nigerian Korup villages, such as Ekonanaku, are large but not solely inhabited by Korup people. All the young people speak the language and they do identify themselves as of the Korup tribe.

The relationship of Korup villages with the other ethnic groups in the region (i.e. Oroko, Ejagham) is nowadays amiable, and there are often intercultural marriages, especially with the much larger Oroko ethnic group. In the past however, there were frequent clashes between villages of different ethnic groups over ownership of forests.

== Language ==
The Korup language is a distinct local dialect that is not related to the neighbouring tribes. Cameroonian Pidgin is used as a local "lingua franca" between people of different ethnic groups in the region, as is the case for most of Anglophone Cameroon. (Note: Cameroonian Pidgin, though very similar to Nigerian Pidgin, it is not exactly the same, although speakers of each are largely mutually understood).

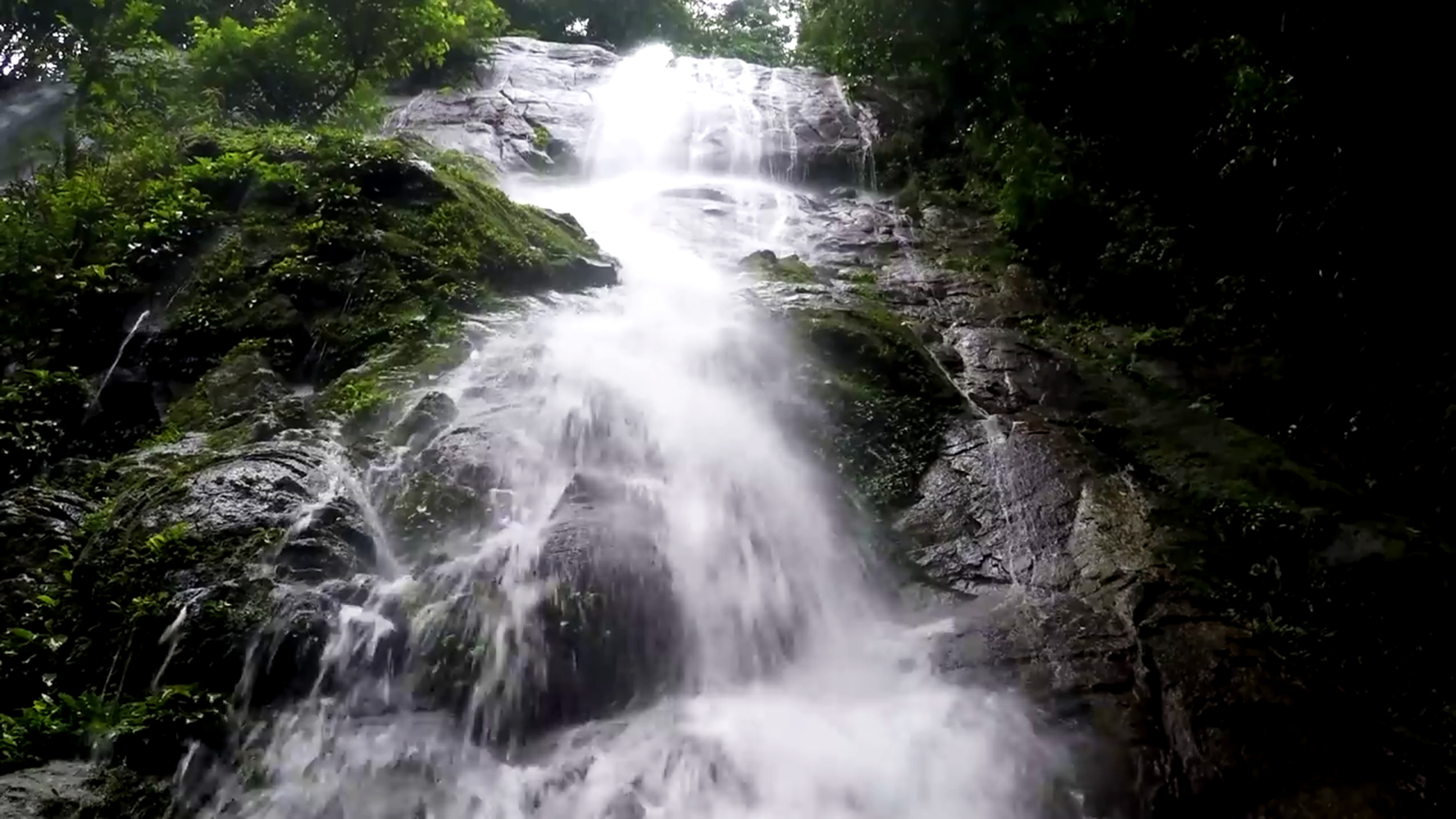
Falling Waters in KORUP National park

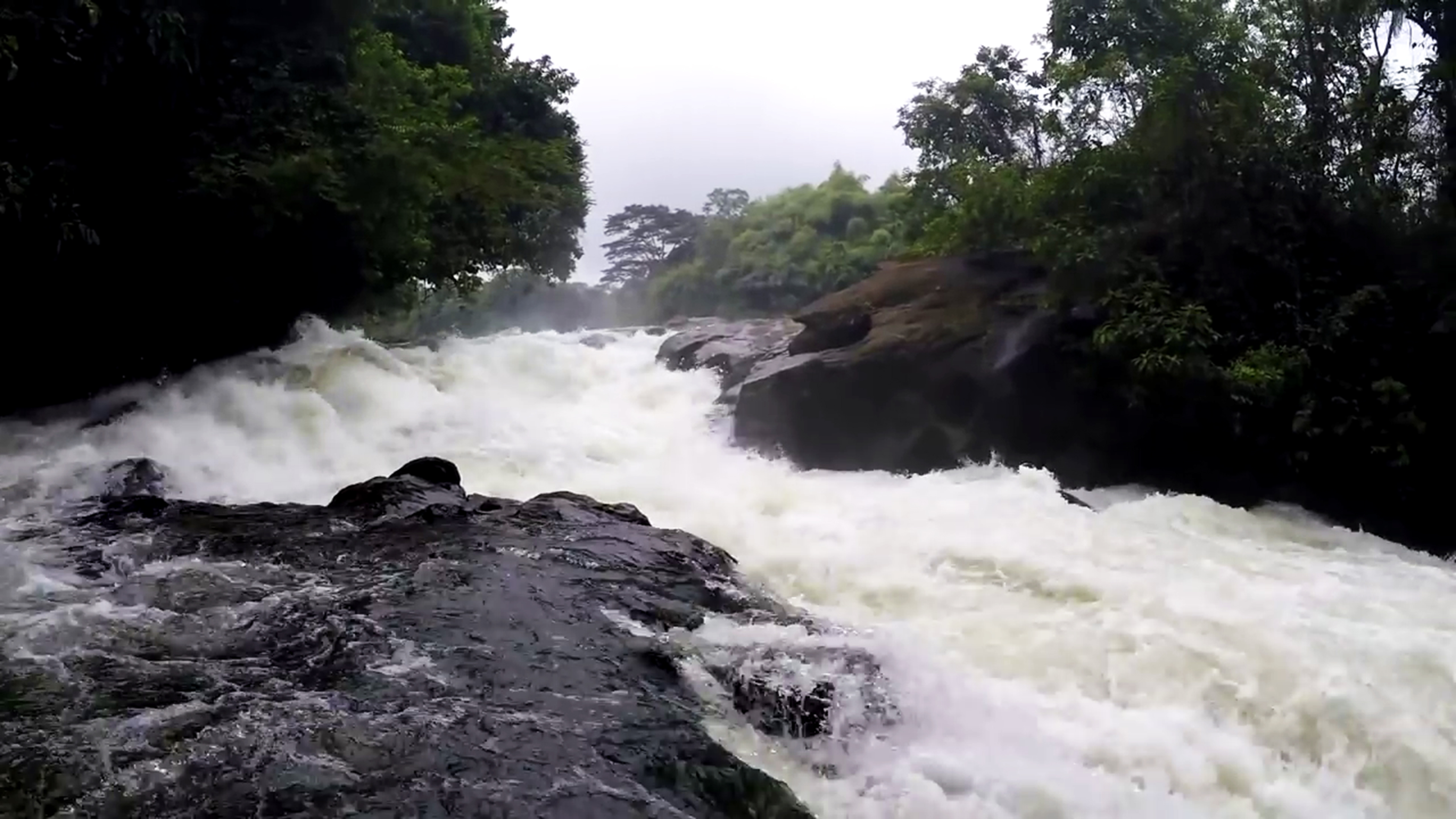
Korup National park
