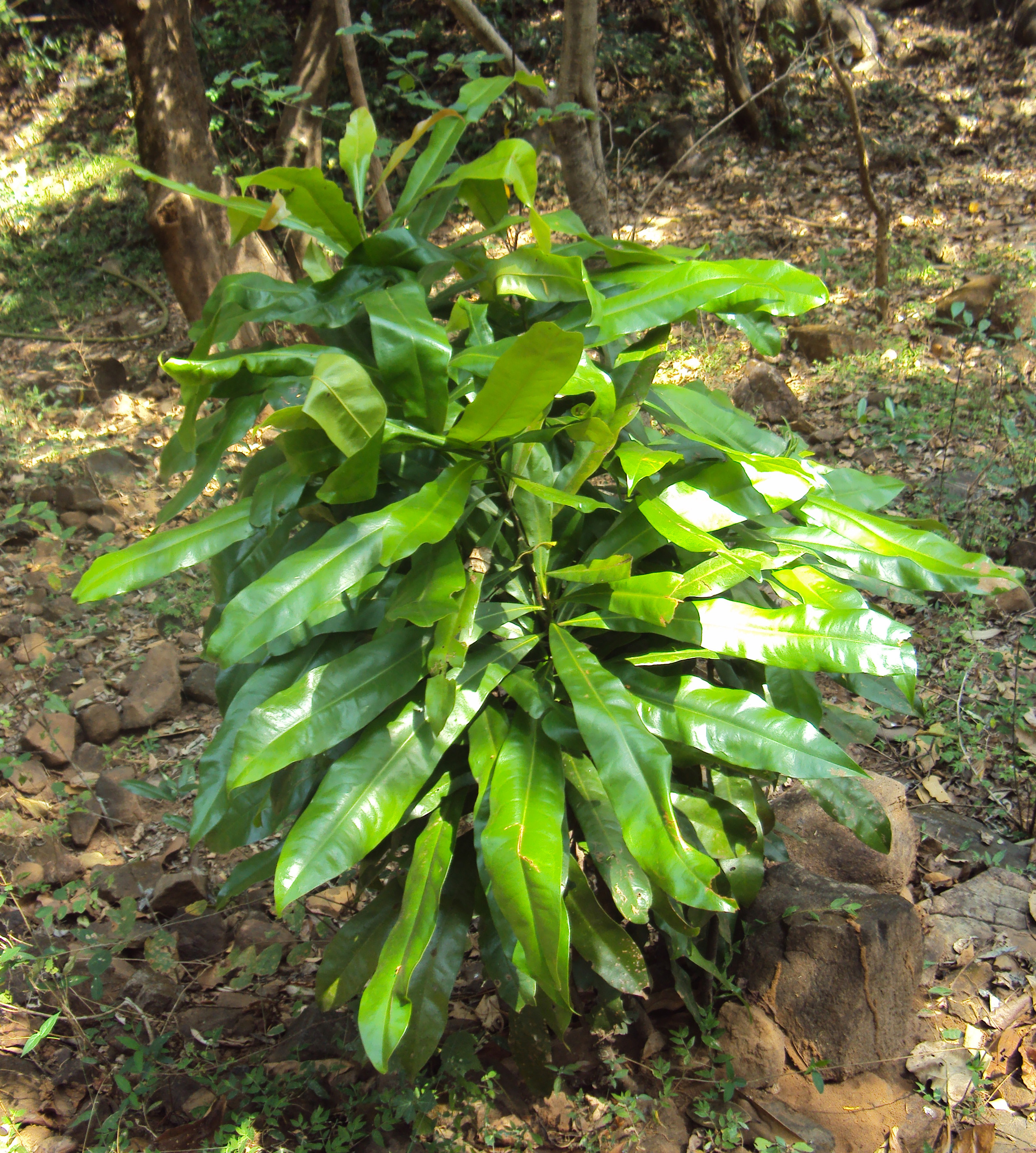
- Ancistrocladus heyneanus

Scientific classification
- Kingdom: Plantae
- Clade: Tracheophytes
- Clade: Angiosperms
- Clade: Eudicots
- Order: Caryophyllales
- Family: Ancistrocladaceae; Planch. ex Walp.
- Genus: Ancistrocladus; Wall.

Species
- See text

Synonyms
- Wormia Vahl (1810), nom. illeg.; Bembix Lour. (1790), nom. rej.; Bigamea Endl. (1840).; Ancistrella Tiegh.(1903).

= Ancistrocladus =

Genus of flowering plants

Ancistrocladus is a genus of woody lianas in the monotypic family Ancistrocladaceae. The branches climb by twining other stems or by scrambling with hooked tips. They are found in the tropics of the Old World.

== Classification ==
The APG II system, of 2003 (unchanged from the APG system, of 1998), also recognizes this family and assigns it to the order Caryophyllales in the clade core eudicots.

Recent molecular and biochemical evidence (see the AP-Website) suggests the carnivorous taxa in the order Caryophyllales (the families Droseraceae and Nepenthaceae and the species Drosophyllum lusitanicum and Triphyophyllum peltatum) all belong to the same clade. This family Ancistrocladaceae would belong to this same clade, although the plants in the family are not carnivorous.

A close relationship between this family and the family Dioncophyllaceae (containing the carnivorous species T. peltatum) is supported by similar pollen and petiole structure. The Cronquist system, 1981, placed the family in the order Violales (together with Dioncophyllaceae). The Takhtajan system placed the family in its own order Ancistrocladales.

== Description ==
The only genus in the family Ancistrocladaceae is Ancistrocladus, a little-known genus of about 20 species. These are palaeotropical, climbing, twining plants, found in lowland to submontane, wet to seasonal evergreen or swamp forests. The sparingly branched, sympodial stem is complex and can exceed 10 cm in diameter. It is along one side attached to the tree with grapnels (short, hooked lateral thorns, formed from modified stem apices), opposite to the leaves. Their leaves are borne in dense, evergreen rosettes. They are entire, have short petioles and lack stipules. They have a single wax-secreting trichome in the epidermal pits and glands on the abaxial surface. The flowers are small with a basally connate corolla, that are imbricate or rolled up lengthwise. The fruit is a nut with often wing-like accrescent sepals.

== Distribution ==
The species of Ancistrocladus are native to tropical Africa, the Indian subcontinent, and Southeast Asia.

== Medicinal potential ==
Scientific interest in this genus has grown considerably because the canopy liana Ancistrocladus korupensis is considered a potential anti-AIDS source by the National Cancer Institute because of its highly effective mode of action against HIV. This plant was discovered in Cameroon and subsequently recognized as a species new to science. Its ingredient michellamine B, an acetogenic napthyl isoquinoline alkaloid, contained in mature leaves, is the active principle. Also, korupensamine E is a new antimalarial drug extracted from the same plant.

Ancistrocladus abbreviatus has been used on traditional medicine in Ghana, as treatment against measles and fever. The active ingredient is ancistrobrevine D, an alkaloid extracted from this plant.

Ancistrocline, an alkaloid derived from A. tectorius, is used against dysentery.

Many other alkaloids are still being found in the other species.

== Species ==
Species accepted as of July 2014:

- Ancistrocladus abbreviatus Airy Shaw - western Africa
- Ancistrocladus attenuatus Dyer - West Bengal, Myanmar, Andaman Islands
- Ancistrocladus barteri Scott-Elliot - western Africa
- Ancistrocladus benomensis Rischer & G.Bringmann - Pahang
- Ancistrocladus congolensis J.Léonard - Congo-Brazzaville, Gabon, Zaïre
- Ancistrocladus ealaensis J.Léonard - Congo-Brazzaville, Gabon, Zaïre, Central African Republic
- Ancistrocladus grandiflorus Cheek - Cameroon
- Ancistrocladus griffithii Planch. - Indochina, Andaman Islands
- Ancistrocladus guineensis Oliv. - Nigeria, Cameroon, Gabon
- Ancistrocladus hamatus (Vahl) Gilg - Sri Lanka
- Ancistrocladus heyneanus Wall. ex J.Graham - southwestern India
- Ancistrocladus ileboensis Heubl, Mudogo & G.Bringmann - Congo-Brazzaville
- Ancistrocladus korupensis D.W.Thomas & Gereau - Nigeria, Cameroon
- Ancistrocladus letestui Pellegr. - Congo-Brazzaville, Gabon, Zaïre, Central African Republic
- Ancistrocladus likoko J.Léonard - Congo-Brazzaville, Zaïre
- Ancistrocladus pachyrrhachis Warb. - Liberia
- Ancistrocladus robertsoniorum J.Léonard - Kenya
- Ancistrocladus tanzaniensis Cheek & Frim. - Tanzania
- Ancistrocladus tectorius (Lour.) Merr. - Andaman Islands, Cambodia, Hainan, Borneo, Sumatra, Laos, Malaysia, Myanmar, Singapore, Thailand, Vietnam
- Ancistrocladus uncinatus Hutch. & Dalziel - Nigeria
- Ancistrocladus wallichii Planch. - Assam, Bangladesh, Andaman Islands
