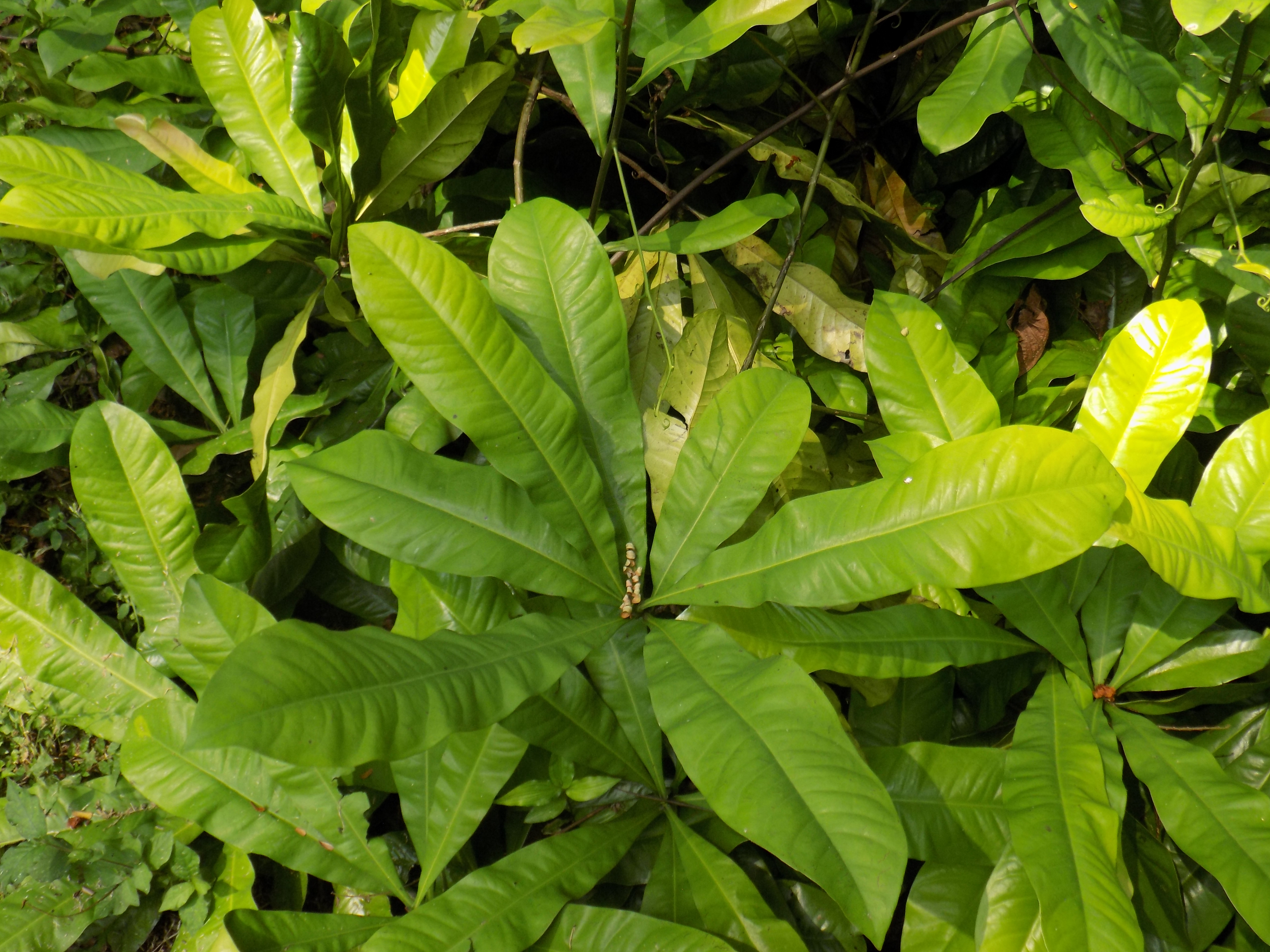

Conservation status
- Endangered (IUCN 3.1)

Scientific classification
- Kingdom: Plantae
- Clade: Tracheophytes
- Clade: Angiosperms
- Clade: Eudicots
- Order: Caryophyllales
- Family: Ancistrocladaceae
- Genus: Ancistrocladus
- Species: A. korupensis

Binomial name
- Ancistrocladus korupensis Thomas and Gereau, 1993

= Ancistrocladus korupensis =

Species of flowering plant

Ancistrocladus korupensis is a species of liana endemic to southwestern Cameroon and the neighbouring regions of Nigeria. The type locality is Korup National Park. The plant was identified as new to science in 1993 after pharmacologically intriguing alkaloids were found in its leaves.

== Description ==
Like other members of its genus Ancistrocladus, this plant starts life as a free-standing bushy plant, with rosettes of eight to ten long leaves at the tip of each branch. When the sapling is three or four metres tall, one shoot develops into an aerial, hooked stem with alternate long leaves, which quests upward in search of a host. When this stem is established in a tree, the rosettes at the base die off. The flowers have yellowish-green sepals, pinkish or yellowish petals, ten stamens in two whorls and three styles. The fruits have five wings. They do not disperse very far, and the function of the wings seems to be to position the fruits correctly for germination rather than to disperse them.

== Distribution and habitat ==
Ancistrocladus korupensis seems to be restricted to the Korup National Park, in Southwest Province, Cameroon. Isolated populations nearby include one in eastern Nigeria. The liana grows in acidic, nutrient-poor soil conditions, typically in sandy soils with a low clay content and low available phosphorus at altitudes of up to 160 m (525 ft). The trees up which it grows are also suited to these environmental conditions, the most common host trees being Oubanguia alata, Microberlinia bisulcata, Strephonema pseudocola, and Cola rostrata.

== Research ==
Mature leaves of Ancistrocladus korupensis contain michellamine A, B and C, atropisomeric alkaloids which have been found to inhibit HIV viral replication. Michellamine B is particularly active against the NID-DZ strain of HIV-2, which is mainly found in West Africa. The National Cancer Institute considers michellamine B to have considerable potential for use against HIV because of its particularly effective mode of action. Additionally, novel alkaloids korupensamines A, B, C and D, with anti-malarial activity, have been isolated from the plant.
