= Ancistrocladus letestui =

Conservation status
- Vulnerable (IUCN 2.3)

Scientific classification
- Kingdom: Plantae
- Clade: Tracheophytes
- Clade: Angiosperms
- Clade: Eudicots
- Order: Caryophyllales
- Family: Ancistrocladaceae
- Genus: Ancistrocladus
- Species: A. letestui

Binomial name
- Ancistrocladus letestui Pellegr.

Species of flowering plant

Ancistrocladus letestui is a species of liana of the plant family of the Ancistrocladaceae occurring in the subtropical or tropical dry forests of Cameroon, Congo-Brazzaville, Zaire, and Gabon. It is threatened by habitat loss.
