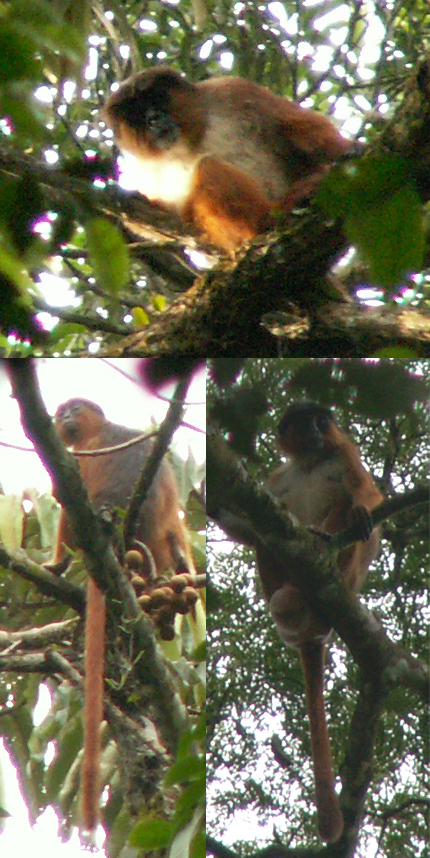

Conservation status
- Critically Endangered (IUCN 3.1)

Scientific classification
- Kingdom: Animalia
- Phylum: Chordata
- Class: Mammalia
- Infraclass: Placentalia
- Order: Primates
- Family: Cercopithecidae
- Genus: Piliocolobus
- Species: P. preussi

Binomial name
- Piliocolobus preussi Matschie, 1900
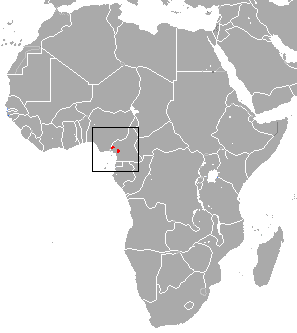
- Preuss's Red Colobus range

= Preuss's red colobus =

Species of Old World monkey

Preuss's red colobus (Piliocolobus preussi) is a red colobus primate species endemic to the Cross-Sanaga Rivers ecoregion. An important population occurs in Korup National Park, Southwest Province, Cameroon, but the species' distribution is localized (groups are frequently encountered near the main tourist camps). The species is considered present in adjacent Cross River National Park - Oban Division in Nigeria and hunter reports suggest that few groups remain in Nkwende Hills and Nta Ali Forest Reserve in the broader Korup region. A population is also present in Ebo forest, Littoral Province of Cameroon.

== Conservation status ==
Preuss's red colobus is critically endangered according to the IUCN Red List due to hunting pressure and the destruction of its habitat. A large portion of the remaining groups are included within protected areas (Korup National Park, Cross River National Park, and the proposed national park at Ebo).

== Ecology ==
Like other colobus monkeys, it is primarily a leaf eater.

== Description ==
Preuss's red colobus has a black head, a black back ticked with orange, and bright red tail, limbs and cheeks.

== Taxonomy ==
Preuss's red colobus has, in the past, been considered a subspecies of P. pennantii and P. badius.
