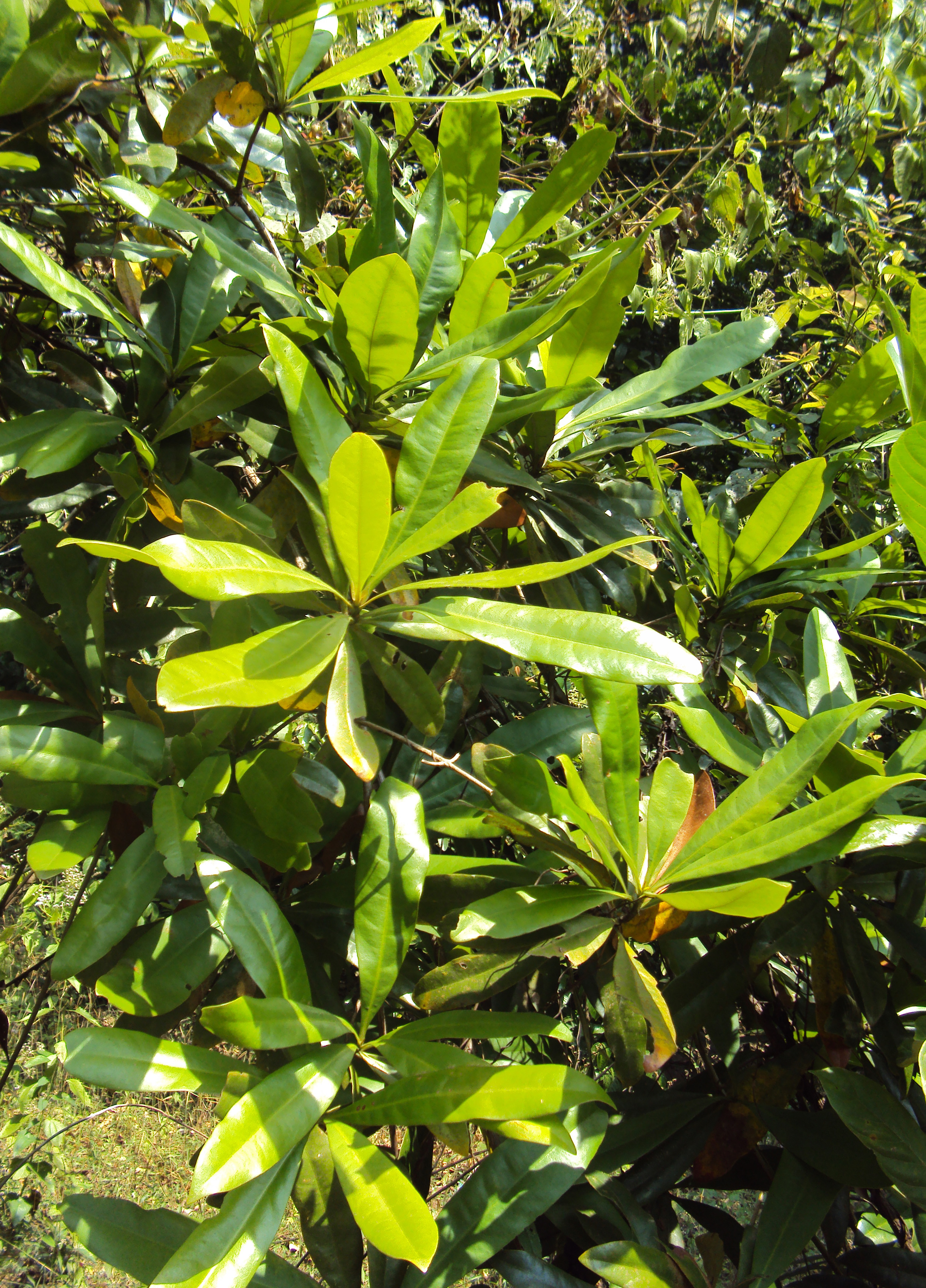
- Leaves of Ancistrocladus heyneanus

Scientific classification
- Kingdom: Plantae
- Clade: Tracheophytes
- Clade: Angiosperms
- Clade: Eudicots
- Order: Caryophyllales
- Family: Ancistrocladaceae
- Genus: Ancistrocladus
- Species: A. heyneanus

Binomial name
- Ancistrocladus heyneanus Wall. ex J.Graham

= Ancistrocladus heyneanus =

Species of flowering plant

Ancistrocladus heyneanus or kardal is a liana endemic to the Western Ghats of southwestern India. Leaves are alternate, oblong in shape, 10–25 cm long, margins are entire.

The species has attracted scientific attention because of its production of biologically active naphthylisoquinoline alkaloids, several of which have shown antimalarial and antiparasitic activity in laboratory studies.

== Description ==
Ancistrocladus heyneanus is a large scandent shrub or liana that climbs using hook-like modified branch tips characteristic of the genus. Leaves are alternate, leathery, oblong to elliptic, and arranged in clusters near the ends of branches. The leaf margins are entire and the lamina is typically 10–25 cm long.

The inflorescences are terminal panicles bearing small flowers. Fruits are winged and adapted for wind dispersal.

== Distribution and habitat ==
The species is endemic to the Western Ghats of India, particularly in parts of Kerala, Karnataka, Maharashtra, Goa, and Tamil Nadu. It grows in tropical evergreen forests, often in shaded forest interiors and along moist slopes.

Like several other members of the genus, A. heyneanus is associated with humid rainforest habitats and is considered part of the relict flora of the Western Ghats.

== Phytochemistry ==
Ancistrocladus heyneanus is known for producing diverse naphthylisoquinoline alkaloids, a rare class of secondary metabolites largely restricted to the family Ancistrocladaceae.

One of the earliest compounds isolated from the species was ancistrocladine, described in 1971 as a structurally unusual isoquinoline alkaloid.

Subsequent studies identified several additional alkaloids from the species, including ancistroheynine A, the first known 7,8′-coupled naphthylisoquinoline alkaloid reported from A. heyneanus.

Further chemical investigations led to the discovery of ancisheynine, a novel alkaloid possessing a previously undescribed N-2,C-8′ linkage between the isoquinoline and naphthalene units.

Another compound, ancistroheynine B, together with related alkaloids such as ancistrocladidine and ancistrotanzanine C, was reported in 2004.

== Medicinal research ==
Research on A. heyneanus has primarily focused on its alkaloids because of their pharmacological potential.

Laboratory studies have shown that some compounds isolated from the species exhibit activity against Plasmodium falciparum, the parasite responsible for the most severe form of malaria.

Additional studies evaluated compounds from the plant for activity against pathogens responsible for leishmaniasis, Chagas disease, and African sleeping sickness.

Raman microspectroscopic investigations conducted in the late 1990s demonstrated that alkaloids in the species could be localized within plant tissues using FT-Raman techniques.

Although several compounds from the plant have shown promising biological activity in vitro, no pharmaceutical products derived from the species have entered clinical use.

== Conservation ==
As an endemic rainforest species restricted to the Western Ghats biodiversity hotspot, Ancistrocladus heyneanus may be vulnerable to habitat degradation and forest fragmentation. The evergreen forests of the Western Ghats have undergone extensive alteration because of plantations, mining, infrastructure development, and logging.

The species is of scientific interest due to its chemically unique alkaloids, making conservation of natural populations important for future phytochemical and pharmacological research.
