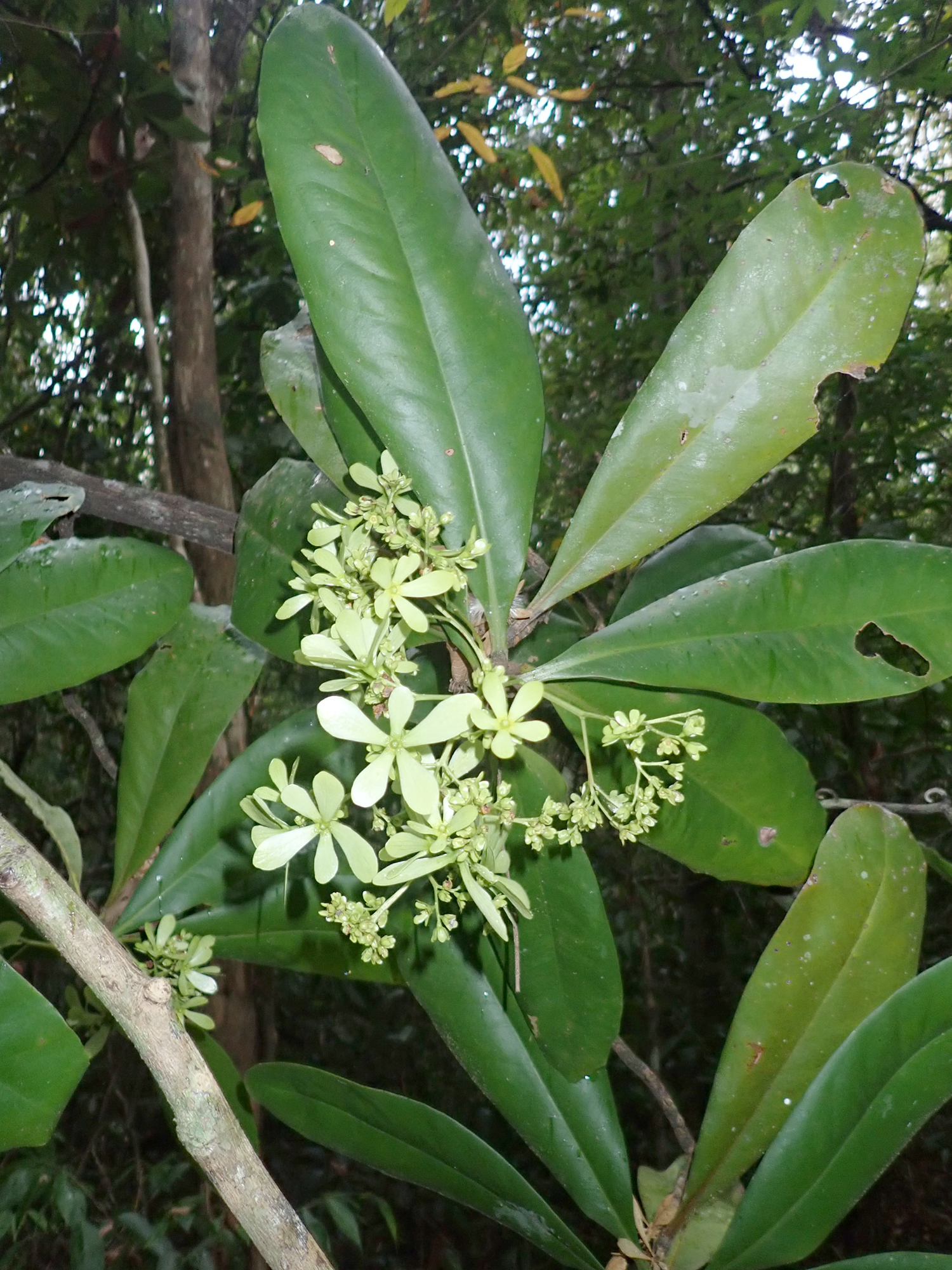
- Flowering A. tectorius in Cát Tiên National Park (April 2018)

Scientific classification
- Kingdom: Plantae
- Clade: Tracheophytes
- Clade: Angiosperms
- Clade: Eudicots
- Order: Caryophyllales
- Family: Ancistrocladaceae
- Genus: Ancistrocladus
- Species: A. tectorius

Binomial name
- Ancistrocladus tectorius (Lour.) Merr.

Synonyms
- Bembix tectoria Lour.; Ancistrocladus benomensis Rischer & G.Bringmann; Ancistrocladus carallioides Craib; Ancistrocladus cochinchinensis Gagnep.; Ancistrocladus extensus Wall. ex Planch.; Ancistrocladus extensus var. pinangianus (Wall. ex Planch.) King; Ancistrocladus hainanensis Hayata; Ancistrocladus harmandii Gagnep.; Ancistrocladus pinangianus Wall. ex Planch.; Ancistrocladus stelligerus Wall. ex A.DC.

= Ancistrocladus tectorius =

Species of flowering plant

Ancistrocladus tectorius is a species of flowering plant in the monogeneric family Ancistrocladaceae. It is found in China (Hainan), Cambodia, India (Andaman and Nicobar Islands), Indonesia, Laos, Malaysia, Myanmar, Singapore, Thailand, and Vietnam. The Vietnamese name is trung quân lợp nhà; Chinese: 钩枝藤, gou zhi teng.

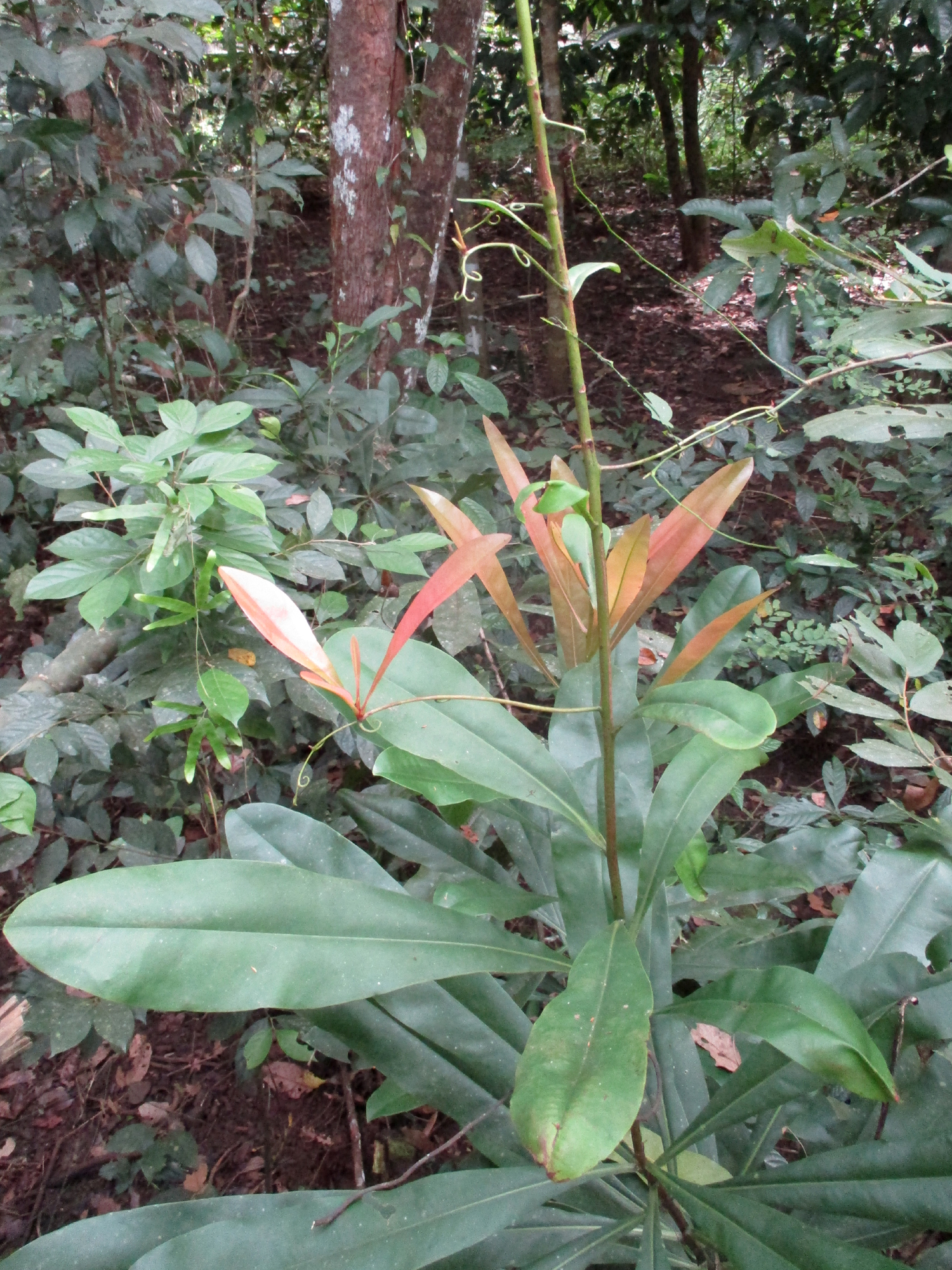
Climbing A. tectorius showing tendrils

== Description and uses ==
These are palaeotropical, climbing, twining plants or lianas, found in lowland to sub-montane, wet evergreen to seasonal tropical forests in valleys and on slopes from sea level to 1600 m. Good specimens can be found in Đồng Nai Province, where leaves are used as roofing material (implied in the Vietnamese name) and a traditional haemostatic by minority Ma people.

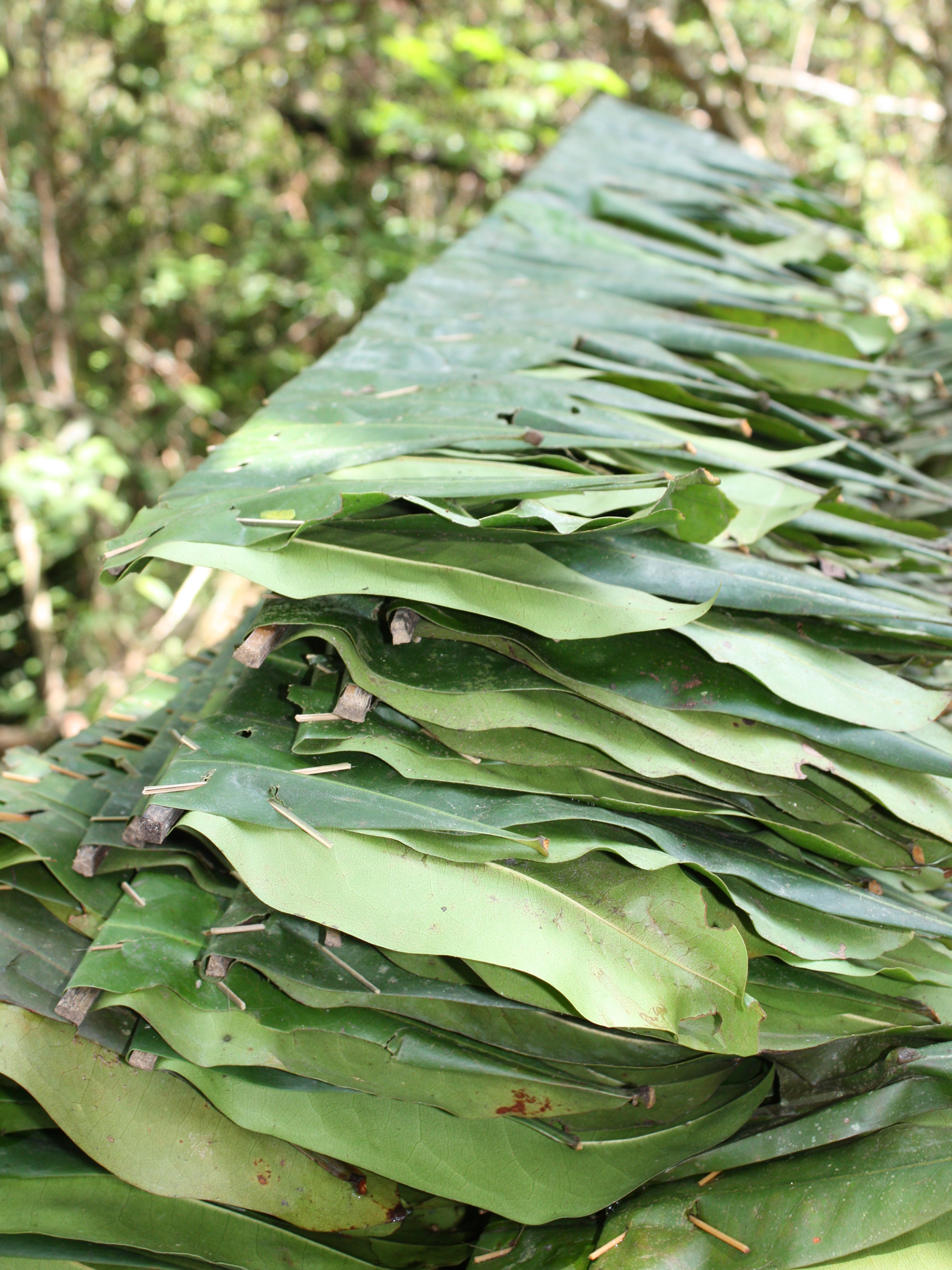
A. tectorius leaves prepared for roofing
