= Korup National Park =

National park in Cameroon

- IUCN category II (national park)
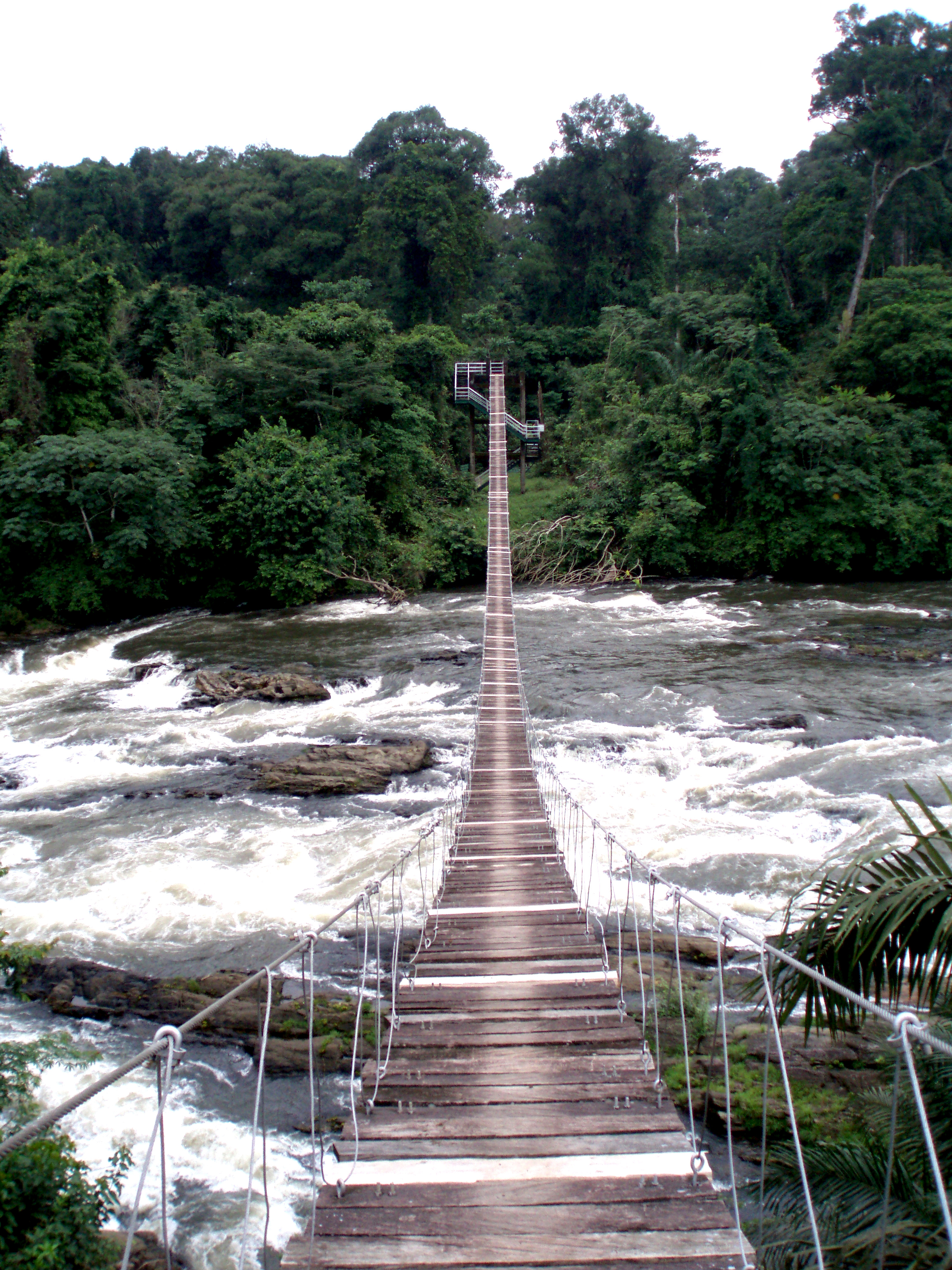
- Mana bridge – Official entrance

- Location within Cameroon
- Location: Southwest Province, Cameroon
- Nearest city: Mundemba
- Coordinates: 5°5′N 8°50′E
- Area: 1,260 km^{2} (490 sq mi)
- Established: 1986
- Governing body: Cameroon Ministry of Forestry and Wildlife (MINFOF)

Korup National Park is in the Southwest Province of Cameroon and extends over 1,260 km^{2} of mostly undisturbed primary forest. It is reputedly one of Africa's oldest and richest tropical forests in terms of floral and faunal diversity. It is the most accessible rainforest national park in Cameroon with basic lodging infrastructure and a large network of trails open to visitors. The park is a popular birdwatching destination and famous for primate viewing (including species such as the drill, Preuss's red colobus, red-eared guenon and Nigeria chimpanzee). Researchers from various disciplines have been conducting biological studies in Korup for over three decades, generating a wealth of information on rainforest ecosystems.

== Location ==
The Korup National Park is in the Southwest Province of Cameroon and lies between 4°54' and 5°28' N latitude and 8°42’ to 9°16’ E longitude. It is 50 km north of the Bight of Biafra and 20 km from the edge of the mangrove swamps of the Rio Del Rey estuary. It shares about 15 km of its western boundary with the Cross River National Park's Oban Division in Nigeria. The area surrounding the park also contains Ejagham, Nta Ali and Rumpi Hills forest reserve.

== History ==
In October 1937, the Korup forest was established as a ‘native administration forest reserve’ by Order No. 25. In October 1986, the Korup forest was made a national park by Presidential Decree No. 86/1283; at the same time the boundaries of the forest reserve were extended eastwards to include the villages of Ekundu Kundu, Ikenge and Bareka Batanga to cover the current surface area of 1260 km^{2}.

The idea of creating KNP was conceived in the early 1970s by Steve Gartlan and Thomas Struhsaker who were both studying forest primates in southwest Cameroon at the time. In 1971 Struhsaker and Gartlan made a proposal to the government of Cameroon, that Korup be declared a national park along with the Douala-Edéa reserve. The Cameroon government made no immediate reaction to their proposal. In 1977, Gartlan met Phil Agland, who wanted to make a documentary about the country's forests for conservation purposes. Agland spent the next five years making a film about the Korup forest.

Phil Agland's award-winning film Korup: An African Rainforest, broadcast on British Television in November 1982 and subsequently around the world, brought the ecology of Korup to an international audience and spearheaded the campaign that was to secure the first British Government contribution of £440,000 through the ODA to rainforest conservation in 1986. In 1987, the Korup Project, an internationally funded integrated conservation and development project, provided support to the newly established park. The Korup Project area included a support zone and the forest reserves of Ejagham, Nta Ali and Rumpi Hills. In 2003, the Korup Project ended, leaving the Korup National Park management with little to no financial and logistical support. This affected the park management's ability to efficiently protect the wildlife from illegal hunting. As of 2006 however, Korup National Park is one of the three focus areas of the "Program of Sustainable Management of Natural Resources – South-West Province" (PSMNR-SWP), a bilateral cooperation between the Governments of Cameroon and Germany. With the renewed attention and support granted to Korup National Park, anti-poaching patrols have been becoming regular once again. As a partner in PSMNR-SWP, WWF-Cameroon has an advisory role on conservation and environmental education in Korup region, while the German Development Service (DED) oversees rural sustainable development activities.

== Management ==
Administratively, the majority of Korup National Park is under the jurisdiction of the Ndian Division of Southwest Province, Cameroon. The park is managed by the Cameroon Ministry of Forestry and Wildlife. The park's management currently consists of a Conservator and approximately 27 game guards. The headquarters are in the town of Mundemba, which is located 8 km east from the park's only official entrance at Mana bridge. A game guard post is located at the bridge. A tourist information center is in the center of Mundemba town.

A five-year management plan was developed for Korup in 2002, stating that the overall goal of the park is the conservation of the biodiversity and integrity of all physical and ecological processes of Korup forest. This is to be achieved through law enforcement, promotion of sustainable land use practices and rural development within local communities, and support for low environmental impact tourism which would generate economic and social benefits to local people.

== Climate ==
Korup has a pseudo-equatorial climate with two seasons instead of four: a pronounced dry season from December to February with average monthly rainfall less than 100 mm and an extended and intense rainy season approximately from May to October. Annual rainfall between 1973 and 1994 measured near southeastern region of the park averaged 5,272 mm (range 4,027–6,368 mm). The heaviest rainfalls are typically in August (some years exceeding 10,000 mm). Temperature varies little throughout the year with mean monthly maximum temperature in the dry season being 31.8 °C and in the wet season 30.2 °C. The northern sections of the park receive considerably less rainfall (~2500–3000 mm).

== Topography ==
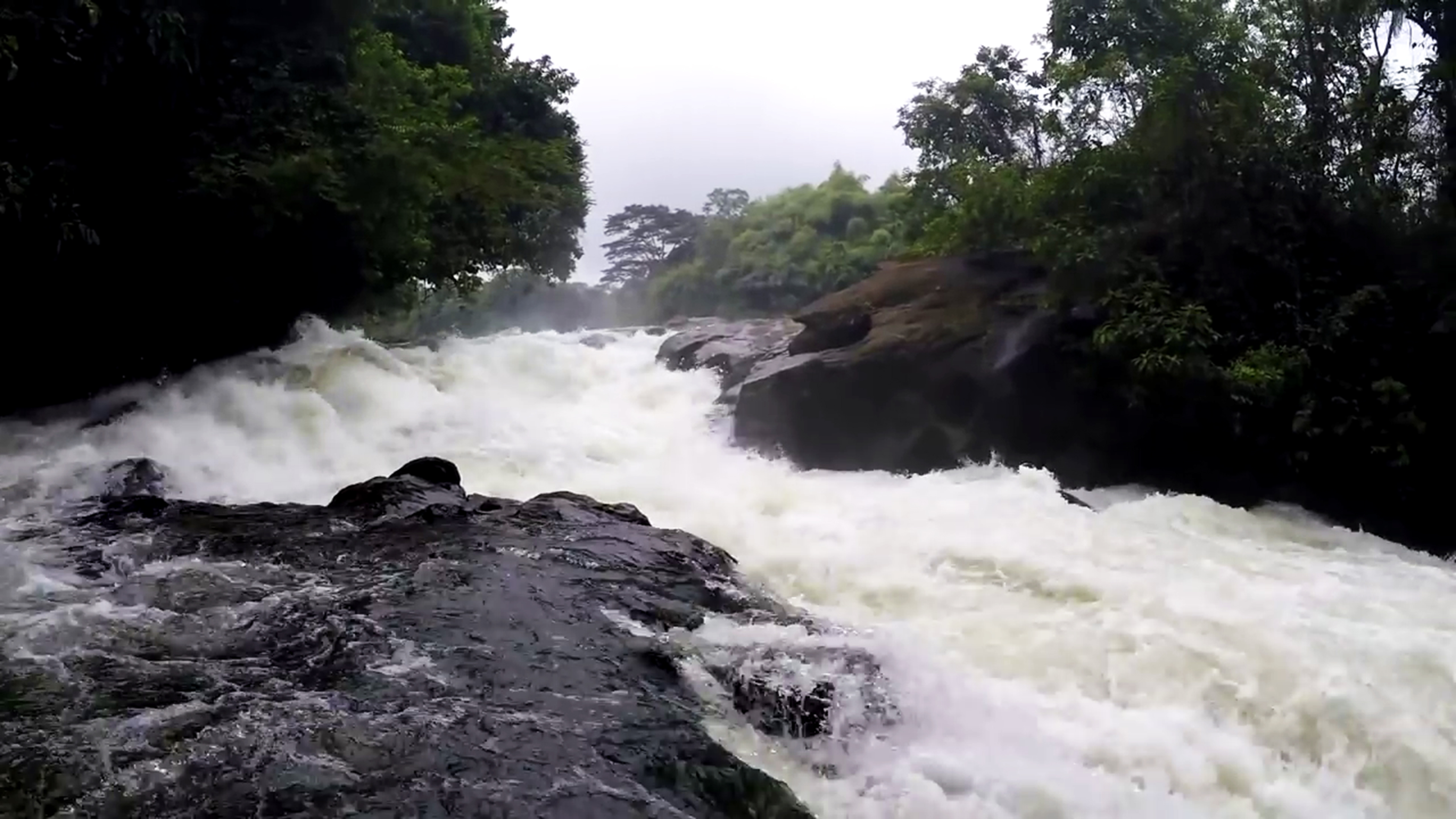
Waterfall in Korup National Park

Korup soils are generally coarse-grained, sandy, well drained and low in nutrients. Their acidic nature and low organic matter make them unfavourable sites for subsistence farming and cash-crop plantations, explaining the low levels of farming disturbance in the park, which remains mostly primary forest. The elevation of the park is low (50 m) in the southern section, rising steadily northwards with increasingly rugged terrain, reaching its highest point at Mt. Yuhan (1,079 m) near the old site of the now relocated Ikondokondo village. To the north, the terrain is characterized by low rolling hills with gentle slopes. Most (82%) of the park lies within an elevation of 120 to 850 m.

A dense network of streams drains Korup region into three major river systems: a) the Korup and Akpassang Rivers, b) the Ndian River, and c) Bake-Munaya River. Many of the smaller streams inside the KNP are seasonally dry during the peak of the dry season.

== Human presence ==
There are currently five villages located inside KNP with a total population in 1999 of approximately 900 people (Erat: 447, Esukutan: 202, Ikenge: 179, Bareka-Batanga: 52, and Bera: 26). In 2000, the Korup village of Ikondokondo (Ekundukundu?) was resettled outside the park as part of a currently suspended plan to resettle all villages. There are 23 additional villages within 3 km from the KNP boundary, an area often referred to as KNP's Peripheral Zone (PZ). The combined population of KNP and PZ villages is approximately 2,700 with a population density of approximately 2 persons/km^{2}. The main livelihood activities in the rural areas is subsistence and cash-crop farming (oil palms, cocoa), fishing, hunting and, to some extent, trading.

== Biodiversity ==
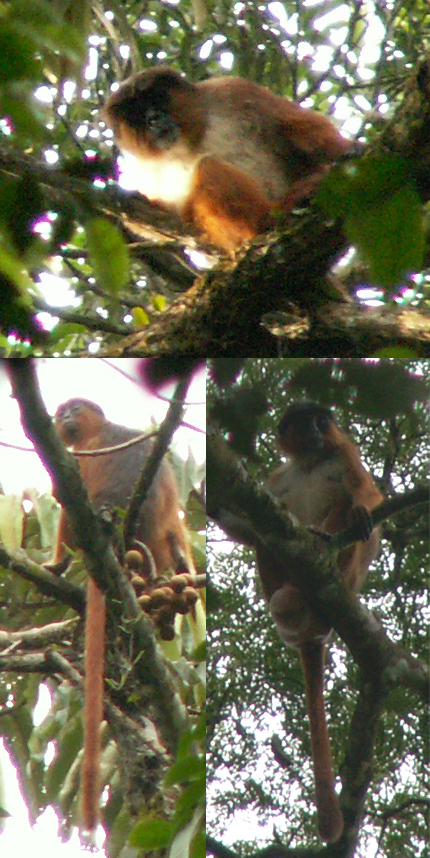
Preuss's red colobus (Procolobus preussi) in Korup National Park, 2009

=== Flora ===
The forests of Korup appear to be ancient and rich in paleoendemics, having survived the dry period of Pleistocene area as part of the Cross River-Mayombe Refugium. Vegetation was classified by Letouzey as primarily Biafran coastal forest dominated by Caesalpinioideae trees, a Leguminosae subfamily. There is no evidence of any major historical human disturbance and at least the south part of the park is likely primary forest. Floristically, Korup is very rich with over 1,100 tree, shrub, herb and liana species described to date and high levels of endemism (30%). Large emergent trees, reaching up to 50 m tall, puncture a mostly continuous but uneven canopy layer of predominantly Annonaceae, Euphorbiaceae, Fabaceae, Olacaceae, Lecythidaceae and Verbenaceae trees at about 15 to 25 m. The understory layer is quite dense with both lianas and small trees (dominated by Rubiaceae species), while the herbaceous layer (mainly Acanthaceae, Araceae, Commelinaceae, Poaceae, Marantaceae, Rubiaceae, and Zingiberaceae) is mostly sparse. Plant ecological processes in Korup are strongly seasonal with flowering typically occurring between January and July (peak March–May), followed by peak fruiting season. The degree of flowering and fruiting varies considerably between years for most species. Mast fruiting occurs in intervals of more than a year.

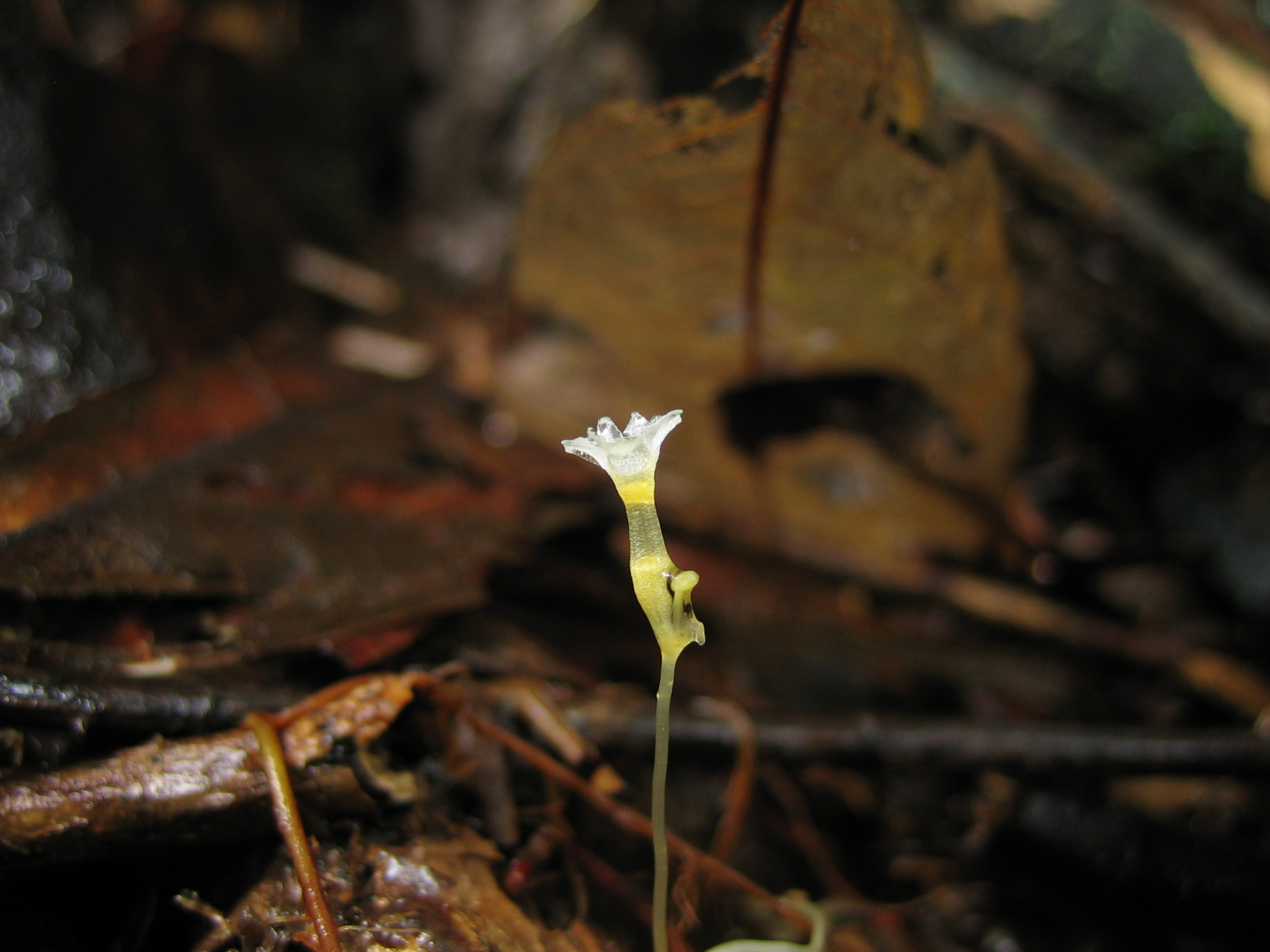
Gymnosiphon bekensis

=== Fauna ===
Korup National Park is reputedly one of the richest lowland African forests in terms of faunal richness and diversity, especially for birds, reptiles, amphibians and butterflies. The species list of mammals consists of 161 species in 33 families, of which the primate community accounts for 14 species (8 diurnal and 6 nocturnal).

== Tourist infrastructure ==
Korup National Park is one of the most accessible rainforest protected areas in Cameroon. Day hikes or multiple day trips can be organized from the town of Mundemba, by visiting the tourist informational office located at the center of the town. Entrance in the park is only permitted with a local guide. There are fixed day, overnight, camping and guide/porter fees. There are three camp sites open to tourists, where visitors can arrange stay either at a tent (bring your own) or at one of the lodges (with basic wooden beds – windows have simple screening). Each camp site is located near a stream which serves as source of cooking water (boil or filter to drink) and for refreshing baths. There are basic pit toilets.

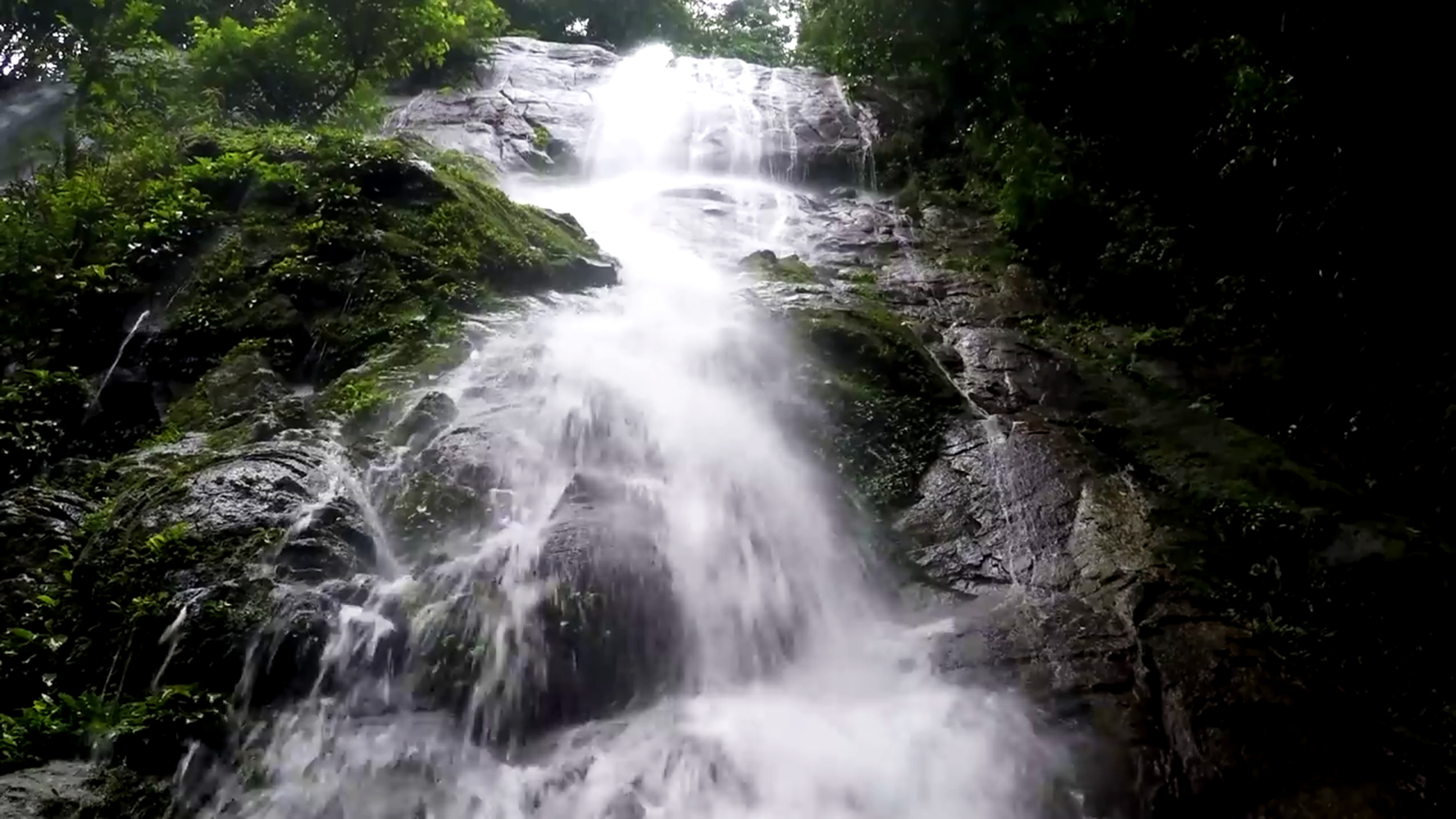
Falling waters in Korup National Park

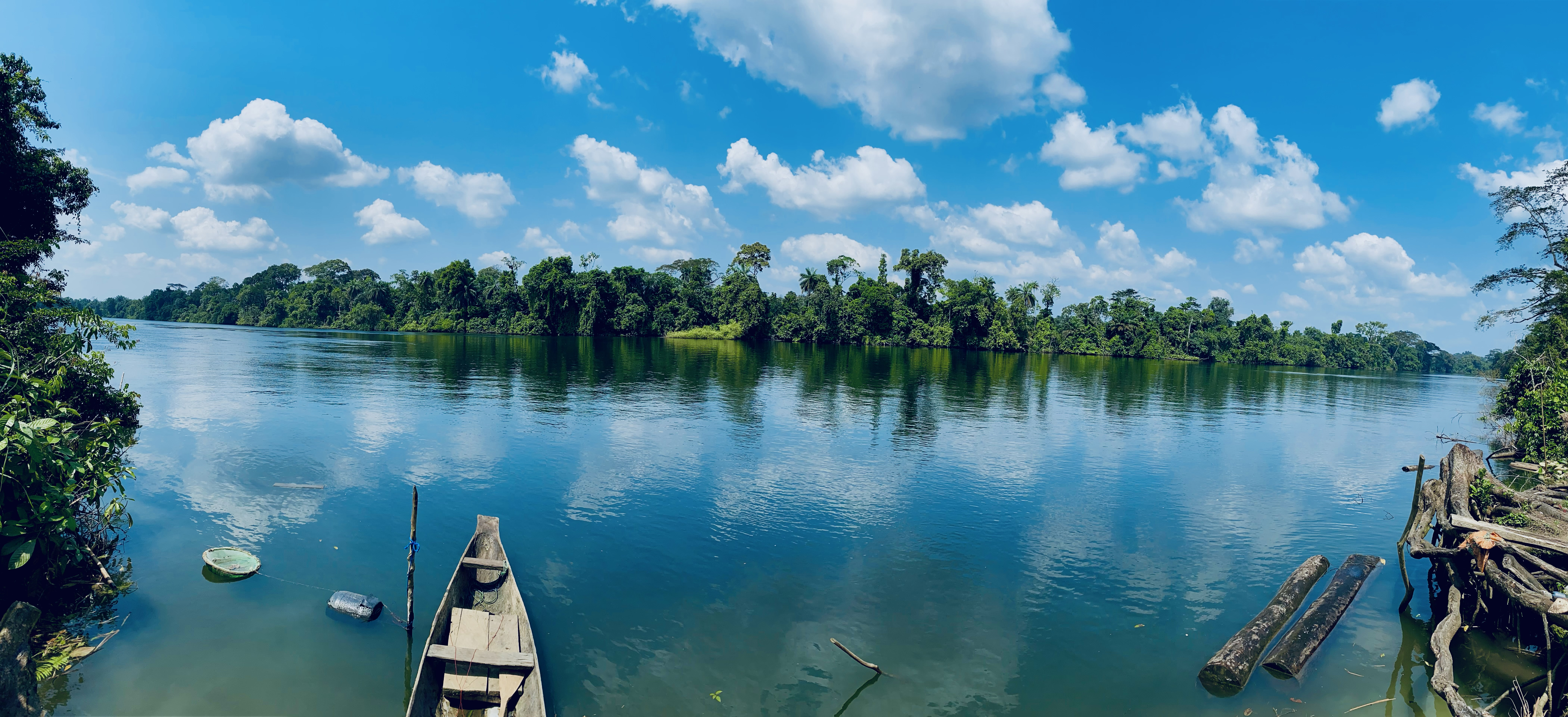
Beautiful sea view en route to Korup National Park

== Role of Civil Society (NGOs) ==
The Korup Rainforest Conservation Society (K.R.C.S) is an active conservation advocacy and participatory forest management oriented group in the area. The group is made of mostly local pro-conservation minded persons and some honorary members (from different parts of the world) who are committed to contributing their expertise in ensuring the integrity of the tropical rain forest through need-based problem solving research as well as increasing participation of locals in conservation activities in a bid to reduce conflicts and improve local livelihoods. Since 2009 KRCS has been very instrumental in assisting visiting researchers with guidance, research permits applications, finding experienced local field assistants as well as elaborating village development and land-use planning, ensuring the recruitment of several locals in different capacities in park activities and playing an active role in environmental education and advocacy for conservation and especially against conversion of neighboring biodiversity rich forest into palm plantation together with international organisation such as Pro-wildlife and WWF-CPO. Recently the activities of KRCS have been boosted by the 2012 Conservation Leadership programme (CLP)Awards; a partnership between CI, FFI, WSC and BirdLife International.

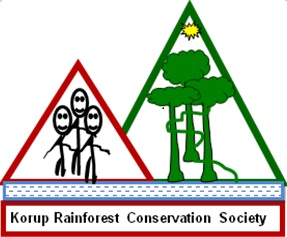

== Other details ==
The Film Greystoke - The Legend of Tarzan, Lord of the Apes starring Christopher Lambert and Andie MacDowell was shot in the park in 1984 before its establishment.

Charles, Prince of Wales inaugurated the park in 1986, and there is a sign not far from the entrance over Mana bridge that marks the point where he reached during his brief visit.

Mana Bridge, which serves as the gateway to Korup National Park, was built by a group of international volunteers on an Operation Raleigh expedition in 1989. The group of more than 100 volunteers spent 3 months in Cameroon building the bridge as well as undertaking wildlife surveys in the forest and adventures by canoe in the Rumpi Hills.

== Prominent Figures ==
Ngomo Ferdinand Namata (1947–2016) or "Pa Namata" as he was affectionately referred to by his colleagues and local communities in and around the park was a Cameroonian naturalist who served in various plant and animal research roles in the Korup National Park and in other rainforest parks across Cameroon. He is widely known for his contributions to the work of the Korup National Park as well as the discovery and classification of new plant species including Ancistrocladus korupensis with potential for HIV treatment and Namataea, a plant genus named after him by Professors D.W.Thomas & D.J.Harris. These accomplishments were spite of his lack of formal education and sole reliance on his extensive local knowledge of plants and animal species. "Pa Namata" came to Ndian Division alongside Dr Steve Gartlan to conduct research in the then Korup Forest Reserve. His work with Dr. Steve Gartlan was one of the key elements which helped Dr Gartlan to develop the proposal which kick-started the Korup Project which eventually become the Korup National Park. After the creation of Korup National Park by Presidential decree in 1986 he continued working with the park and built his knowledge of plants and animals to a considerably advanced level. His work with many local and global researchers and tourists during this period earned him much recognition. As part of the Korup National Park, he worked in several capacities including as a Naturalist, Tourist Guide, Research Assistant and Park interpreter. He gave guided tours to tourists, assisted in wildlife and plant inventory, trained students and researchers. He also worked with national and international researchers to help them achieve their research objectives, supporting them with his extensive local knowledge of plants and animals. Ngomo Ferdinand Namata received much recognition and many accolades for his dedication and commitment to nature conservation and scientific research amongst which are:

-Naming of Namata Ledges and Namata Ledges Trail inside Korup National Park

-The naming of a new plant genus (specie) "Namataea" after him

-A certificate of recognition for his contribution to the advancement of science

-A Government of Cameroon medal of honour for his service to advancing science in Cameroon

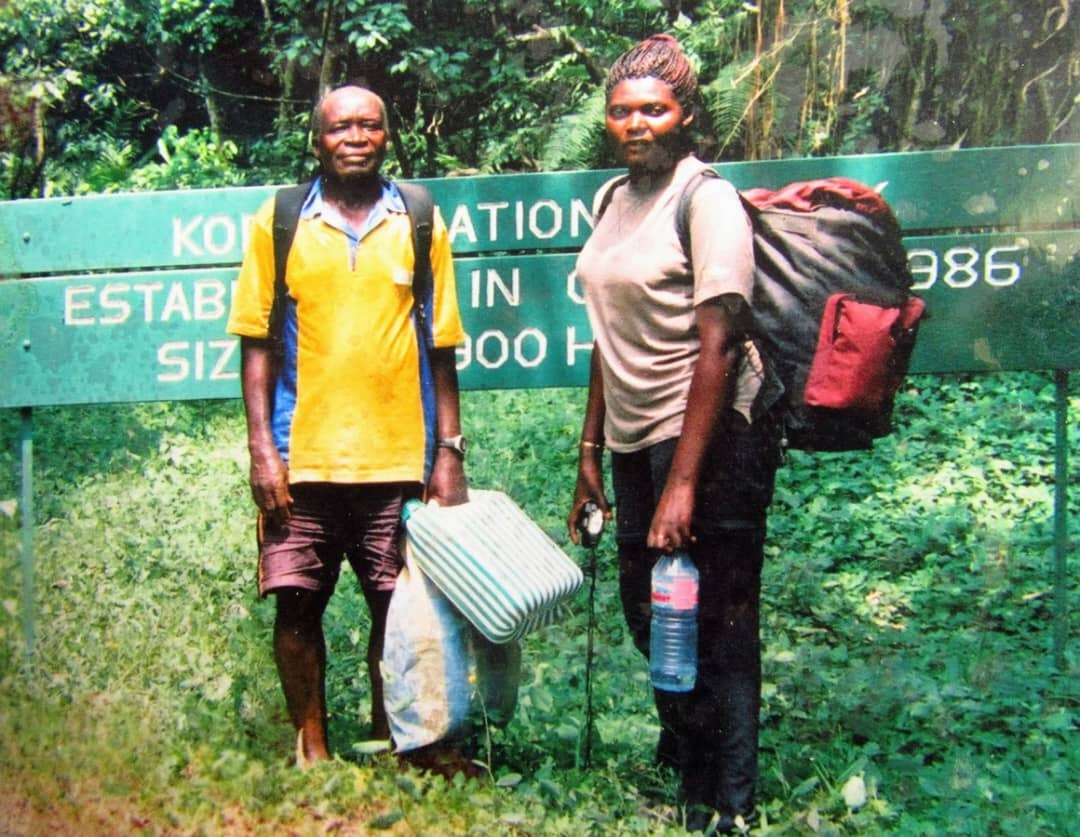
"Pa Namata" with female researcher at the entrance to Korup National Park

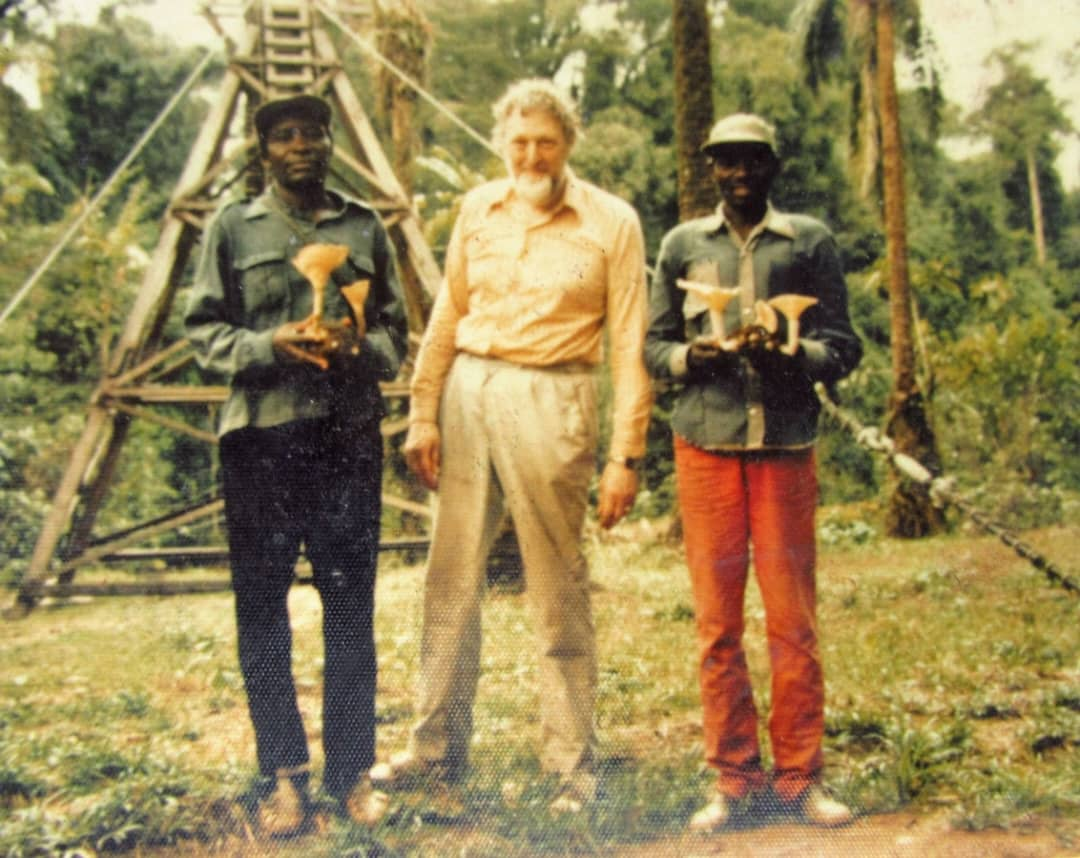
"Pa Namata" with colleague and researcher in front of old Mana suspension bridge

== See also ==
- Media related to Korup National Park at Wikimedia Commons
