= Namataea =

Scientific classification
- Kingdom: Plantae
- Clade: Tracheophytes
- Clade: Angiosperms
- Clade: Eudicots
- Clade: Rosids
- Order: Sapindales
- Family: Sapindaceae
- Genus: Namataea; D.W.Thomas & D.J.Harris
- Species: N. simplicifolia

Binomial name
- Namataea simplicifolia D.W.Thomas & D.J.Harris

Genus of plants

Namataea is a monotypic genus of flowering plants belonging to the family Sapindaceae. The only species is Namataea simplicifolia.

Its native range is Nigeria to Cameroon.

The plant is named for the Naturalist (1947 - 2016) Ngomo Ferdinand Namata who worked in the Korup protected area from as early as 1973 when the biodiverse rich protected area was still known as Korup Forest Reserve. From its official reclassification as a national park in 1986, "Pa NAMATA" as he was fondly called continued in Korup National Park and was instrumental in providing local knowledge to researchers and working with conservation and community development organisations in the Korup National Park and other rainforest parks across Cameroon.

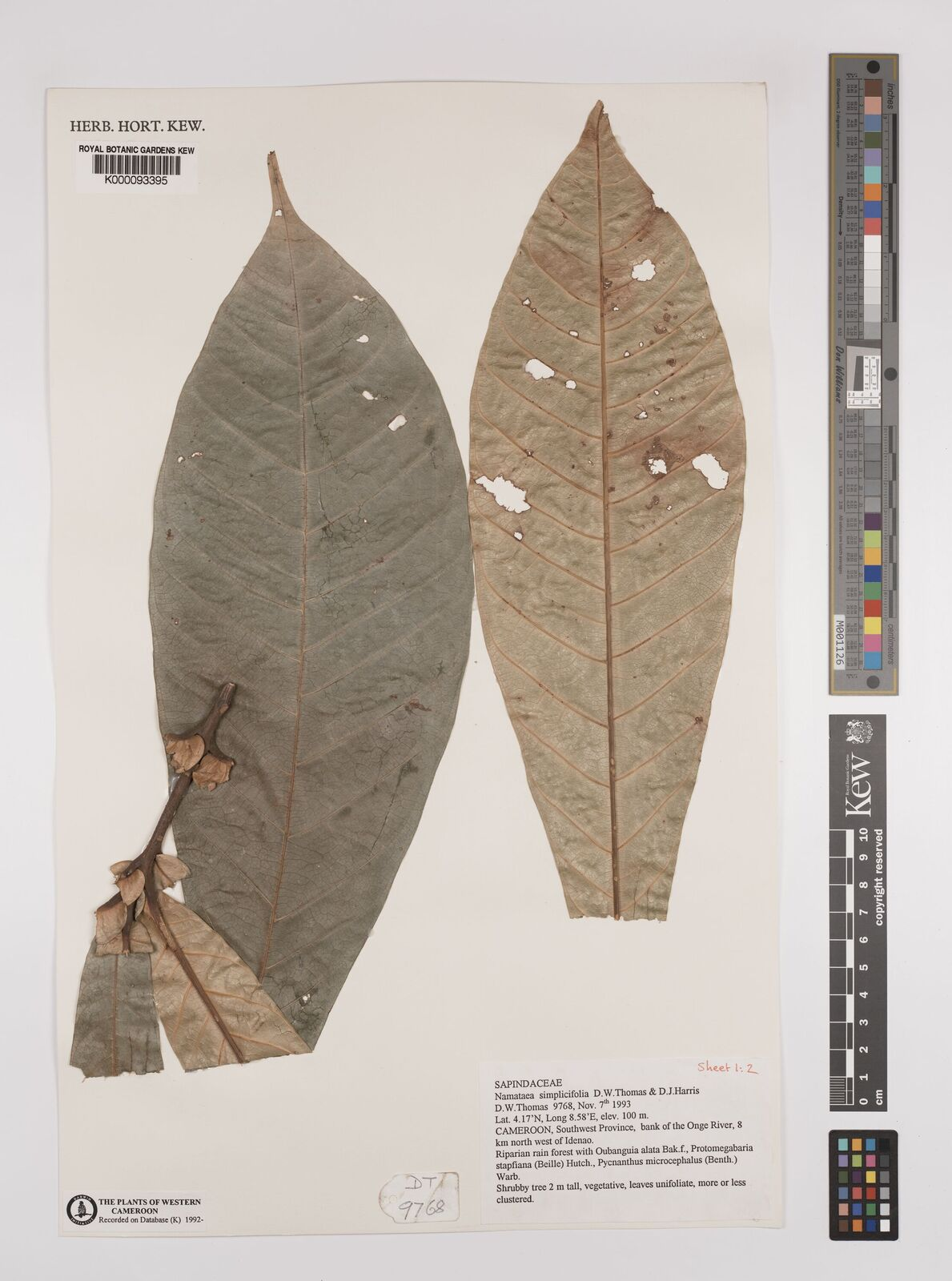
Image of Namataea plant
