= Phil Agland =

English director and filmmaker

Phil Agland (born 1950) is an English director and filmmaker.

== Biography ==
Agland was born in Weymouth, Dorset in 1950. He was initially educated at a grammar school in Winchester and later attended the University of Hull. Graduating with a degree in geography, Agland worked in North America and traveled the world for four years after. He spent his early career filming nature documentaries, spending five years making a documentary on the Korup National Park in Cameroon. Released in 1982, Korup: An African Rainforest prompted the British government to contribute hundreds of thousands of pounds to a forest investment scheme in the country. The same year, he co-produced a six-part miniseries, Fragile Earth, under Partridge Films.

It was followed in 1984 by Siarau: Life in the Mangrove Forest and Baka: The People of the Rainforest in 1987, the latter of which was produced by Channel 4. For Channel 4, he also produced the series, China: Beyond the Clouds, which was aired in 1994. In 1997, he released a cinematic adaptation of Thomas Hardy's The Woodlanders. It received critical acclaim, later being awarded the Golden Goblet Award for Best Feature Film the same year. He has released two more documentaries since; Shanghai Vice in 1999 and A French Affair in 2004.

== Filmography ==
- Korup: An African Rainforest (1982)
- Siarau: Life in the Mangrove Forest (1984)
- Baka: People of the Rainforest (1987)
- China: Beyond the Clouds (1994)
- The Woodlanders (1997)
- Shanghai Vice (1999)
- A French Affair (2004)
