= Antigone Metaxa-Krontera =

Greek author and actress

Antigone Metaxa-Krontera (Greek: Αντιγόνη Μεταξά-Κροντηρά; 1905–1971) (Note: According to Duggan et al, Metaxa-Krontera died in 1972.) was a Greek writer of children's literature. She used the pseudonym, Theia Lena (Θεία Λένα, "Aunt Lena"). She also was the founder of Greece's first children's theater.

She studied theatre and first worked as an actress. In 1932, she founded the first Greek children's theatre. During the late 1930s, she established the first weekly radio programs for children in Greece. Later she performed on television, hosting a show called Kalispera paidakia (Good evening, children) alongside Panos Hatzikoutselis and Rena Pagrati.

She published around 200 children's books, including 50 that she wrote herself. She published a children's encyclopedia, the first published in Greek. She also was editor for a children's newspaper which was published twice monthly.
