= The Woodlanders =

1887 novel by Thomas Hardy

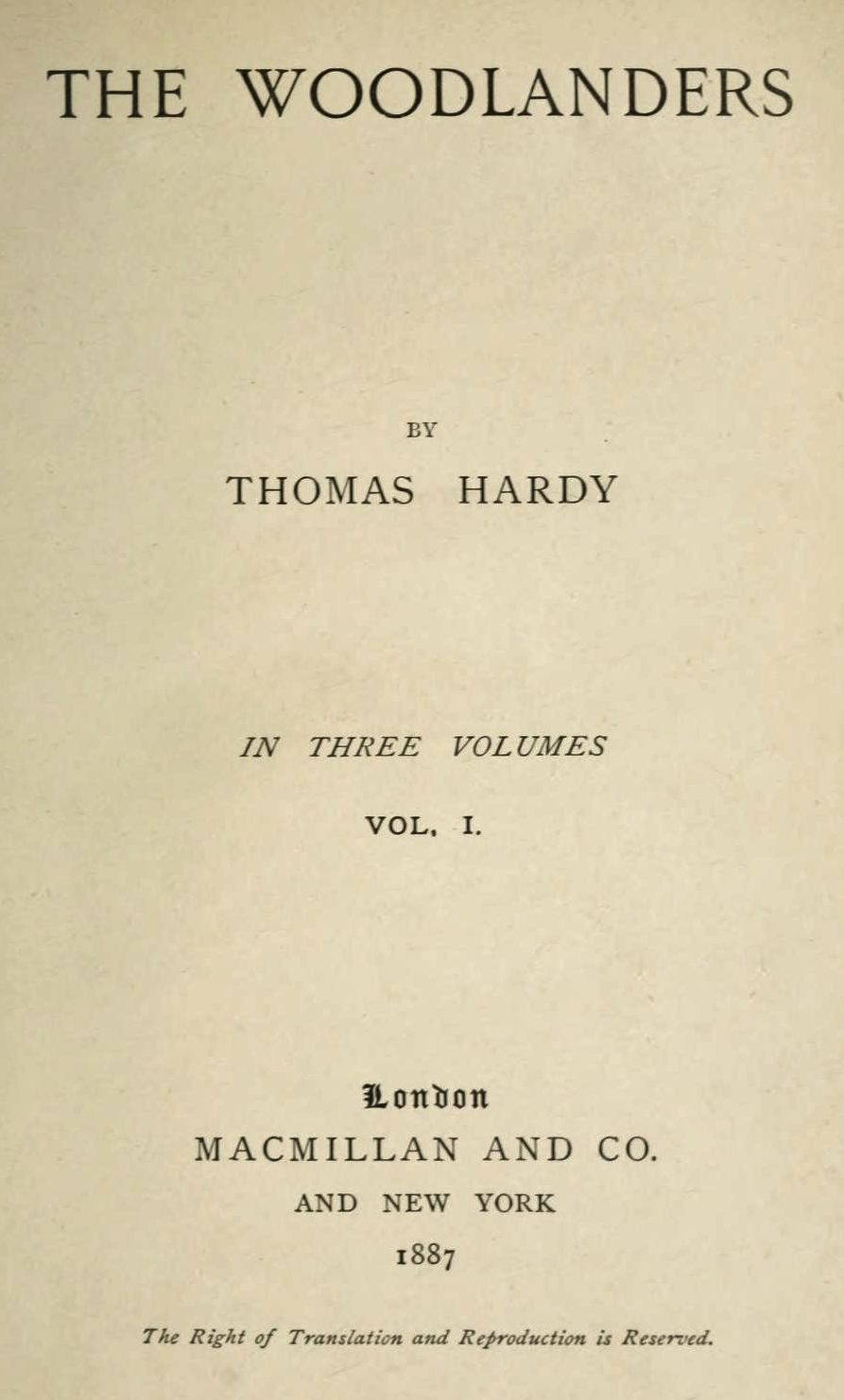
- First edition title page
- Author: Thomas Hardy
- Language: English
- Genre: Novel
- Publisher: Macmillan and Co
- Publication date: 1887
- Text: The Woodlanders at Wikisource

The Woodlanders is a novel by Thomas Hardy serialised from 15 May 1886 to 9 April 1887 in Macmillan's Magazine and published in three volumes in 1887. It is one of his series of Wessex novels.

== Plot summary ==
The story takes place in a small woodland village called Little Hintock, and concerns the efforts of an honest woodsman, Giles Winterborne, to marry his childhood sweetheart, Grace Melbury. Although they have been informally betrothed for some time, her father has made financial sacrifices to give his adored only child a superior education and no longer considers Giles good enough for her. When the new doctor – a well-born and handsome young man named Edred (Note: Hardy (1896), The Woodlanders, Harper and Brothers, p. 164. "Edgar" in the 1896 Harper edition.) Fitzpiers – takes an interest in Grace, her father does all he can to make Grace forget Giles, and to encourage what he sees as a brilliant match. Grace has misgivings prior to the marriage as she sees a village woman (Suke Damson) coming out of his cottage very early in the morning and suspects he has been sleeping with her. She tells her father that she does not want to go on with the marriage and he becomes very angry. Later Fitzpiers tells her Suke has been to visit him because she was in agony from toothache and he extracted a molar. Grace clutches at this explanation – in fact Fitzpiers has started an affair with Suke some weeks previously. After the honeymoon, the couple take up residence in an unused wing of Melbury's house. Soon, however, Fitzpiers begins an affair with a rich widow named Mrs. Charmond, which Grace and her father discover. Grace finds out by chance that Suke Damson has a full set of teeth and realises that Fitzpiers lied to her. The couple become progressively more estranged and Fitzpiers is assaulted by his father-in-law after he accidentally reveals his true character to him. Both Suke Damson and Mrs Charmond turn up at Grace's house demanding to know whether Fitzpiers is all right – Grace addresses them both sarcastically as "Wives -all". Fitzpiers later deserts Grace and goes to the Continent with Mrs Charmond. Grace realises that she has only ever really loved Giles but as there is no possibility of divorce feels that her love seems hopeless.

Melbury is told by a former legal clerk down on his luck that the law was changed in the previous year and divorce is now possible. He encourages Giles to resume his courtship of Grace. It later becomes apparent, however, that Fitzpiers' adultery is not sufficient for Grace to be entitled to a divorce. When Fitzpiers quarrels with Mrs. Charmond and returns to Little Hintock to try to reconcile with his wife, she flees the house and turns to Giles for help. He is still convalescing from a dangerous illness, but nobly allows her to sleep in his hut during stormy weather, whilst he insists on sleeping outside. As a result, he dies. After it is learned that Mrs Charmond has died, murdered by a jealous former lover, Grace allows herself to be won back to the (at least temporarily) repentant Fitzpiers, thus sealing her fate as the wife of an unworthy man. This is after Suke's husband Timothy Tangs has set a man trap to try to crush Fitzpiers' leg but it only tears Grace's skirt.

No one is left to mourn Giles except a courageous peasant girl named Marty South, who has always loved him. Marty is described as a plain girl but one with beautiful hair. She is persuaded to sell this at the start of the story to a barber who is procuring it for Mrs Charmond, after Marty realises that Giles loves Grace and not her. She precipitates the final quarrel between Fitzpiers and Mrs Charmond by writing to Fitzpiers and telling him of the origin of most of Mrs Charmond's hair.

== Literary analysis ==
The novel was later classified by Hardy for the Wessex Edition of his works in the primary group of "Novels of Character and Environment". Yet despite it being regarded as one of Hardy's major novels, the novel is 'something of an anomaly', in comparison with the tragic depth of both its predecessor The Mayor of Casterbridge and its successor Tess of the D'Urbervilles.

=== Themes ===
The novel reflects common Hardy themes: a rustic, evocative setting, poorly chosen marriage partners, unrequited love, social class mobility, and an unhappy, or at best equivocal, ending. As with most his other works, opportunities for fulfilment and happiness are forsaken or delayed.

==== Marriage and sexuality ====
The Woodlanders marks the beginnings of controversy for Hardy's novels. At this point in his career he was established enough as a writer to take risks, especially in the areas of sexuality, such as marriage, divorce, marital fidelity, and the use of unconventional plots and tones, and seemingly immoral conclusions. Hardy's portrayal of sexual morality led to him being identified with the 'Anti-marriage league'.

That marriage is less-than-exclusive in the novel is highlighted most clearly through the words and thoughts of Grace Melbury; as heroine and betrayed wife of an unfaithful husband, she ought to represent the moral centre, but she openly acknowledges sexual and marital infidelity. On Fitzpiers' illness, she welcomes Mrs Charmond and Suke Damson into the bedroom with the unsubtle, "Indeed, you have a perfect right to go into his bedroom [...] Wives all, let's enter together!" When abandoned by him, she calls nature "bountiful" in so soon replacing him with another, tender form of "undiluted manliness" – Giles.

== Background ==
Florence Emily Hardy, his second wife, recorded that in 1874 Hardy "put aside a woodland story", which ten years later evolved into The Woodlanders. It was intended to be the successor to his 1874 Far from the Madding Crowd, but he laid the novel aside to work on other things.

Hardy eventually decided to return to his "woodland story" after the editor of Macmillan's Magazine asked for a new serial in October 1884. It was published as a serial in this magazine and in the American Harper's Bazaar in 1887, followed by a three-volume first edition in March of the same year.

== Reception ==
The Woodlanders was widely praised. It was declared by the Saturday Review in April 1887 to be, "the best [novel] that Hardy has written", by Sir Arthur Quiller-Couch, "his loveliest if not his finest book", by William Lyon Phelps, "the most beautiful and most noble of Hardy's novels", and by A. Edward Newton, "one of the best novels of the last half century". The late nineteenth century English author George Gissing read the novel in March 1888 "with much delight" but felt that the "human part is...painfully unsatisfactory".

The novel remained a personal favourite of Hardy. Newman Flower recounted that Hardy named it to him as his "favourite novel", and 25 years after its publication, Hardy wrote that, "On taking up The Woodlanders and reading it after many years, I like it as a story best of all."

== Adaptations ==
Soon after the novel's publication, Hardy was approached by Jack Grein and Charles Jarvis for permission to adapt it for performance in 1889. But although various drafts were written, the project came to nothing. It was not until 1913 that A.H. Evans' play in 3 acts was produced by the Dorchester Debating and Dramatic Society; the performance was also taken to London that year and to Weymouth in 1914. Years after Hardy's death, David Horlock's adaptation was staged at Salisbury Playhouse in 1983 and in the following century two dramatic adaptations of the novel went on tour in the West Country. In 2013 the New Hardy Players put on Emily Fearn's version, and in 2016 the Hammerpuzzle Theatre Company put on Tamsin Kennard's version.

The BBC made the novel into a film in 1970, starring Felicity Kendal and Ralph Bates. This was followed by Phil Agland's The Woodlanders of 1997.

There have also been musical settings of various kinds of passages from the novel. Patrick Hadley's Scene from The Woodlanders (1925) sets the final words for voice and chamber ensemble and was published by Oxford University Press in 1926. The novel was next adapted as an opera by Stephen Paulus and premiered by Opera Theatre of Saint Louis in 1985. A decade later it was performed at Oxford Playhouse in February 1995. A 15-minute Suite from the Woodlanders was also drawn from this by Paulus and in 1999 four descriptive passages were set by Anthony Payne as Scenes from "The Woodlanders (1999) for soprano, two clarinets, violin and cello. This was described by Payne himself as "a strange hybrid, midway between song cycle and tone poem".

The novel was dramatised in ten 15-minute episodes for BBC Radio 4 by Ayeesha Menon in 2021, as part of a series called "Hardy's Women".
