= Michellamine =

Michellamine B

Names
- Preferred IUPAC name (1R,1′R,3R,3′R)-5,5′-(1,1′-Dihydroxy-8,8′-dimethoxy-6,6′-dimethyl[2,2′-binaphthalene]-4,4′-diyl)bis(1,3-dimethyl-1,2,3,4-tetrahydroisoquinoline-6,8-diol)

Identifiers
CAS Number	143168-23-4
3D model (JSmol)	Interactive image
ChEMBL	ChEMBL295292
ChemSpider	400564
PubChem CID	454909
CompTox Dashboard (EPA)	DTXSID50162329
- InChI: InChI=1S/C46H48N2O8/c1-19-9-25-27(41-31-13-21(3) 47-23(5)39(31)33(49)17-35(41)51)15-29(45(53)43(25)37(11-19)55-7)30-16-28(26-10-20(2)12-38(56-8)44(26)46(30)54)42-32-14-22(4)48-24(6)40(32)34(50)18-36(42)52/h9-12,15-18,21-24,47-54H,13-14H2,1-8H3/t21-,22-,23-,24-/m1/s 1
- SMILES: Oc1c8c(c(c(O)c1)c2cc(c(O)c3c2cc(cc3OC)C)c7c(O)c4c(cc(cc4OC)C)c(c5c(O)cc(O)c6c5C[C@H](N[C@@H]6C)C)c7)C[C@H](N[C@@H]8C)C

Properties
Chemical formula	C_{46}H_{48}N_{2}O_{8}
Molar mass	756.896 g·mol^{−1}
- Except where otherwise noted, data are given for materials in their standard state (at 25 °C [77 °F], 100 kPa). Infobox references

Michellamines are a group of atropisomeric alkaloid which have been found to be HIV viral replication inhibitors in vitro. It was discovered in the leaves of Ancistrocladus korupensis. There are three michellamines represented as A, B, and C; however, michellamine B is the most active against the NID-DZ strain of HIV-2.

== Occurrence ==
Michellamine A and B occur naturally in Ancistrocladus korupensis leaves. Other chemical substances including alkaloids, tannins, and saponins are found in the roots, leaves, stems, flowers, or bark.

== Synthesis ==
There are two methods explored to synthesize michellamines A and B. The first one, originally synthesized in 1994, is a retrosynthesis that leads to a biomimetic pathway that uses the construction of naphthalene/isoquinoline bonds before the naphthalene/naphthalene axis. The second method, originally synthesized only a few montes after the first method, is a complementary pathway that would use the naphthalene/naphthalene axis after it is created and add the two isoquinoline moieties.

== Research ==
Michellamines inhibit protein kinase C and virus-induced cellular fusion. They have a broad range of effectiveness in vitro across most HIV strains, particularly the HIV-2 strain, which is found primarily in and around Cameroon.
