= Maria Iliou =

Greek film director, scriptwriter and producer

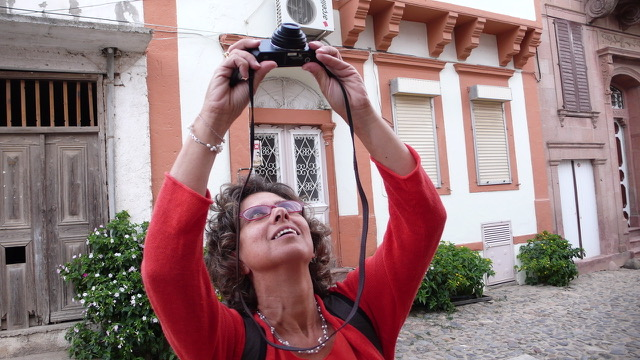
- Born: Maria A. Iliou; 5 December 1960; Athens, Greece
- Education: Universita di Padova
- Occupations: Scriptwriter and director of feature films and historical documentaries, writer of novels
- Spouse: Stefan Piree (1986 - 2022)
- Children: Nefeli Pirée - Iliou
- Relatives: Leda Krontira (mother), Antigone Metaxa (grandmother), Kostas Krontiras (grandfather)

Maria Iliou is a Greek film director, scriptwriter and producer, well known in Greece and internationally both for her feature films and the historical documentaries she has directed in recent years. She was born in Greece and lives and works in Athens and New York City. Her best-known films are the feature-length films, The Four Seasons (1996), Alexandria, a Love Story (2002) and 90-minute historical documentaries: The Journey: The Greek American Dream (2007), Smyrna, The Destruction of a Cosmopolitan City, 1900-1922 (2012), From Both Sides of the Aegean (2012) and Dear Aunt Lena (2017), Athens from East to West 1821-1896 (2020) and Athens in the Interwar Period 1922-1940 (2025). Her films have been shown in various countries and have won major distinctions and awards. Maria Iliou is also a writer of novels: Her novel A Friendship in Smyrna, published in 2022, received the prestigious Ourani Prize of the Academy of Athens for the best novel of the year in Greece.

== Early years & Education ==
Maria Iliou was born in Athens in 1960, the daughter of Maria-Leda Krontira, an educator and writer of children’s books, and tobacco merchant Andreas Iliou. On her mother's side she is descended from the island of Cephalonia and Athens and on her father's from Smyrna in Asia Minor. From a very young age she took part in the radio programs of her grandmother, Antigone Metaxa (Aunt Lena) on Hellenic Public Radio (EIR) telling stories and singing songs as well as in the radio plays of her grandfather, Kostas Krontiras’ Wednesday at the Theater, producing sounds in collaboration with the sound engineer.

She studied literature and philosophy at the University of Padua in Italy, from where she graduated summa cum laude and with an honorary distinction in 1983, supporting a doctoral thesis on indirect free speech in the works of Alexandros Papadiamantis.

At the same time she graduated from the Stavrakos Film School in Greece, where she studied film directing. She continued her studies in film directing in Italy at Ermanno Olmi’s Ipotesi Cinema film school with a scholarship from the Italian government, while participating in European Community seminars on scriptwriting, film directing and film production: EAVE (1993), Frank Daniel’s Workshop (1994), Sources (1995), Arista (1999).

== Career ==
Maria Iliou’s career began in Greece. From 1983 to 1985, she worked for the Hellenic Broadcasting Corporation in Athens where she directed the program A City-Ship, which presented topics related to modern literature, music and film. During that same time she also worked as a translator presenting Alberto Savinio to Greek readers for the first time with her translation of his book Maupassant and "the other" (Ypsilon Publications).

In Italy from 1987 to 1990 she worked as assistant director and Casting Director with Giuseppe and Bernardo Bertolucci on the films I Cammelli, Amori in Corso, La Domenica Specialmente, Bologna 90.

In 2003 a Fulbright career grant took her to New York where she studied with Marketa Kimbrell at NYU’s Tisch School of the Arts and worked on her scripts with script analyst Laurie Hutzler in Los Angeles. She is a member of both the European Film Academy and the Hellenic Film Academy and has served as a member of the jury at international film festivals and on committees of international organizations.

=== Feature films ===
In 1987, her first film The Encounter won a Hellenic Ministry of Culture Award. In 1991, she founded the A CITY-SHIP (MIA POLI-PLIO) production company. Her second feature film Seaward Window (1992) won an Istituto Luce Award in Italy in 1993. In 1996 her film Three Seasons won awards at the 37th Thessaloniki Film Festival and at the Würzburg International Film Festival in (Germany).

Her feature Alexandria, a Love Story (2001) tells the story of a mother and daughter who, on a trip to Egypt, rediscover each other through her mother’s tale of an old Alexandrian love. Alexandria, a Love Story won a Hellenic Ministry of Culture award as well as awards at the international film festivals of São Paulo in Brazil, Gran Canaria in Spain, Wurzburg in Germany and Houston in the USA, while film historian Professor Karalis called it one of the best Greek films of the 2000s in his book A History of Cinema.

=== Historical documentaries ===
In 2003 in New York while conducting archive research in the context of the script development for her feature film A Friendship in Smyrna, during the period of her Fulbright scholarship, she discovered forgotten visual material on Smyrna as well as on the migration of the Greeks to America. The material was so fascinating that it led her, instead of a feature film, to make a documentary while at the same time salvaging the forgotten visual material. In 2005 she founded the non-profit company PROTEUS NY INC & PROTEAS whose purpose it is to discover and preserve audiovisual archival material related to Greek history, chiefly in America and Europe. In collaboration with other cultural organizations it produces films, exhibitions and books that make these lost images accessible to the public.

From 2007 to the present day the company has presented historical documentaries that met with great success. The Journey: The Greek American Dream, a documentary on the immigration of the Greeks to America, was presented at the Benaki Museum in Greece and was later screened at the Metropolitan Museum of Art and on PBS in Chicago. It also won an award from the American Film Institute in Washington as one of the best films of the year. (The European Showcase). The following year she was honored for her work by the city of New York.

In 2012 she presented the historical documentary Smyrna, The Destruction of a Cosmopolitan City, 1900-1922, a documentary that brings to the people lost images of cosmopolitan Smyrna, collected from over 30 American and European archives but also a new perspective on the history of the city. After its screening at the Benaki Museum, the documentary was screened in movie theaters in Greece and the US as well as on Greek television (a total of over 250,000 viewers). The screenings subsequently continued in European and American cities while it had a run of over three weeks at the Quad Cinema in New York. With the support of the Stavros Niarchos Foundation the documentary was also screened at 22 universities in the United States and Canada.

It was followed by the historical documentary From Both Sides of the Aegean, on the population exchange between Greece and Turkey (1922-1924).

In 2017 she presented the documentary Dear Aunt Lena, on the life and work of the educator Antigone Metaxa with whom many generations of Greeks grew up, tuning in to her radio programs and reading her books. This was a very personal film since Aunt Lena was Iliou's grandmother.

In 2020, she presented Athens from East to West, 1821-1896, the first of six long-length documentaries about the history of modern Athens from 1821 to 2021, that form part of the Athens Rising project. Screenings were held in Athens at the Benaki Museum and Megaron the Athens Concert Hall. In 2022, the second film in the series, Athens and the Great Idea, 1896-1922, was presented at the Benaki. In 2025, the third documentary of the series, Athens in the Interwar Period, 1922-1940, was presented with great success at the Megaron Athens Concert Hall. New screenings have been scheduled for May 2025 at the same venue. Her principal collaborator on all three of these films was the historian Alexander Kitroeff (Haverford College).

The next three documentaries in the series — Athens Rising: Athens Caught in Conflicts, 1940-1950, Athens Spreading Out, 1950-1974, and Athens a European Capital, 1974-2021 — are currently being prepared. They will be screened at the Megaron Athens Concert Hall in the years to come.

=== Exhibitions and publications based on her films ===
Maria Iliou has curated six exhibitions at the Benaki Museum with photos from her documentary films from 2007-2020 and published three coffee table books based on her films: The Journey, the Greek-American Dream, Smyrna the Destruction of a Cosmopolitan City and Athens from East to West, 1821-1896.

=== Novels ===
Maria’s Iliou novel A Friendship in Smyrna was published by Minoas editions in Greece in 2022. The book has been reprinted four times and has been awarded the prestigious Ourani Prize of the Academy of Athens, for the best novel in Greece in 2022.

== Filmography ==
Title	Year	Duration	Specifications
The Encounter	1987	30’	16mm
Seaward Window	1991	60’	16mm
Aegean	1995	60’	HD
Three Seasons	1996	1.30’	35mm
Stop the Bombs	1999	30’	HD
Alexandria, a Love Story	2002	1.30’	35mm
The Journey: The Greek American Dream	2007	1.30’	HD
Smyrna, the Destruction of a Cosmopolitan City, 1900-1922	2012	1.30’	HD
From Both Sides of the Aegean, 1922-1924	2012	1.30’	HD
Dear Aunt Lena	2017	1.30’	HD
Athens from East to West, 1821-1896	2020	1.27’	HD
Athens and the Great Idea, 1896-1922	2022	1.27’	HD
Athens in the Interwar Period, 1922-1940	2025	1.27’	HD
