= Mundemba =

- Town
- Location in Cameroon
- Coordinates: 4°58′12″N 8°54′35″E
- Country: Cameroon
- Province: Southwest Province
- Division: Ndian

Mundemba is a town in Southwest Region, of Cameroon and the capital of the Ndian Division. The headquarters of Korup National Park are located in Mundemba. The separate village of Manja is nowadays practically an extension of Mundemba.

== People ==
Mundemba was and still remains a predominantly Oroko settlement, but given the economic importance and administrative role of the town, many of the residents are from other local ethnic groups (i.e. Korup, Ejagham), and also the Anglophone North westerners, Francophone (esp. government employees), and people from Nigeria. with the population of about 80% youth.

== Economy ==
The main employment opportunities in Mundemba revolve around agricultural goods (esp. palm oil), trading, and the public sector. Probably the biggest local employer is PAMOL Plantations, a public limited company that maintains a large African Oil Palm plantation adjacent to the township. Some sections of the local economy benefit from tourists visiting the renowned Korup National Park, located 8 km west of the town.

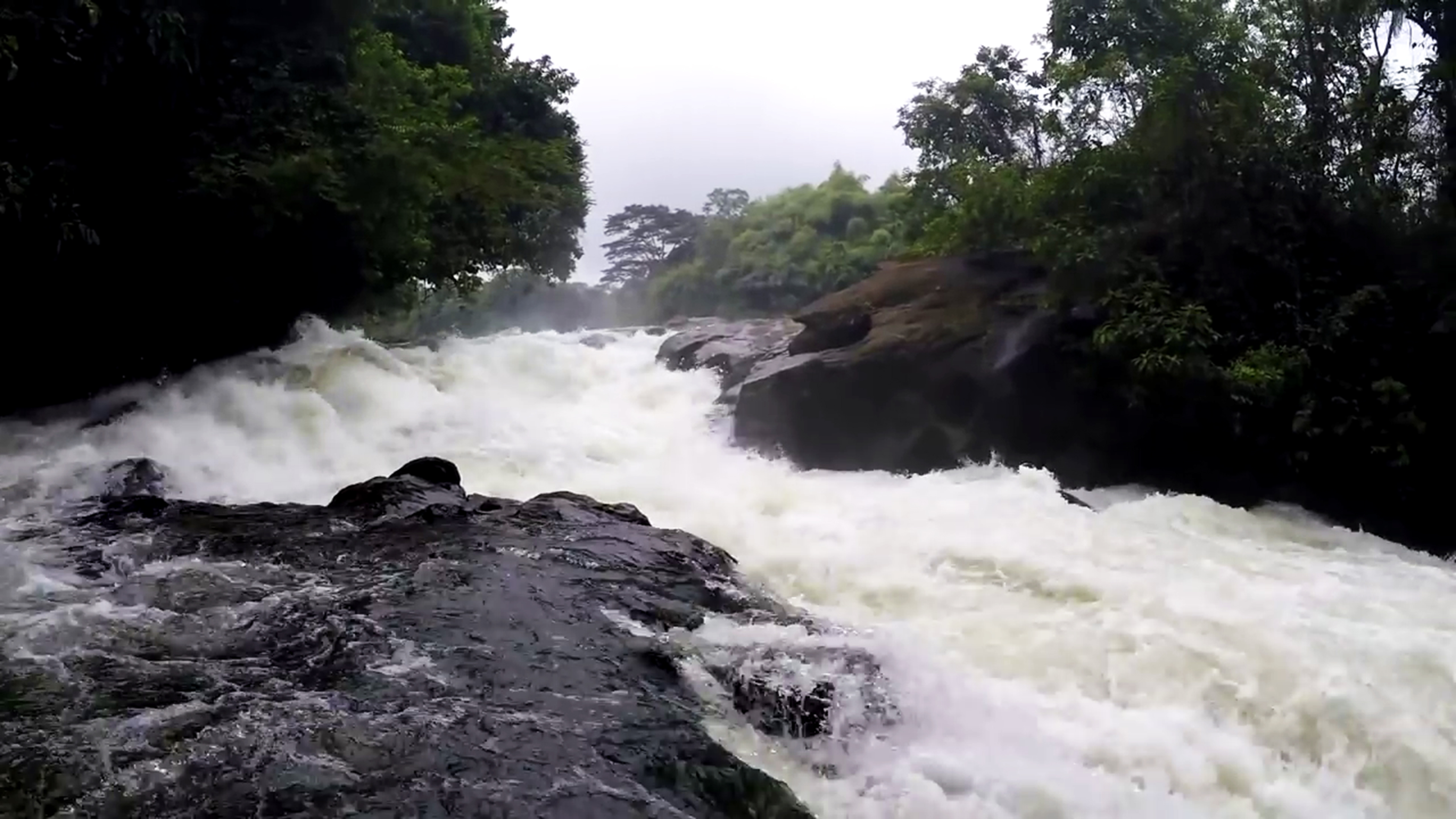
Korup National park

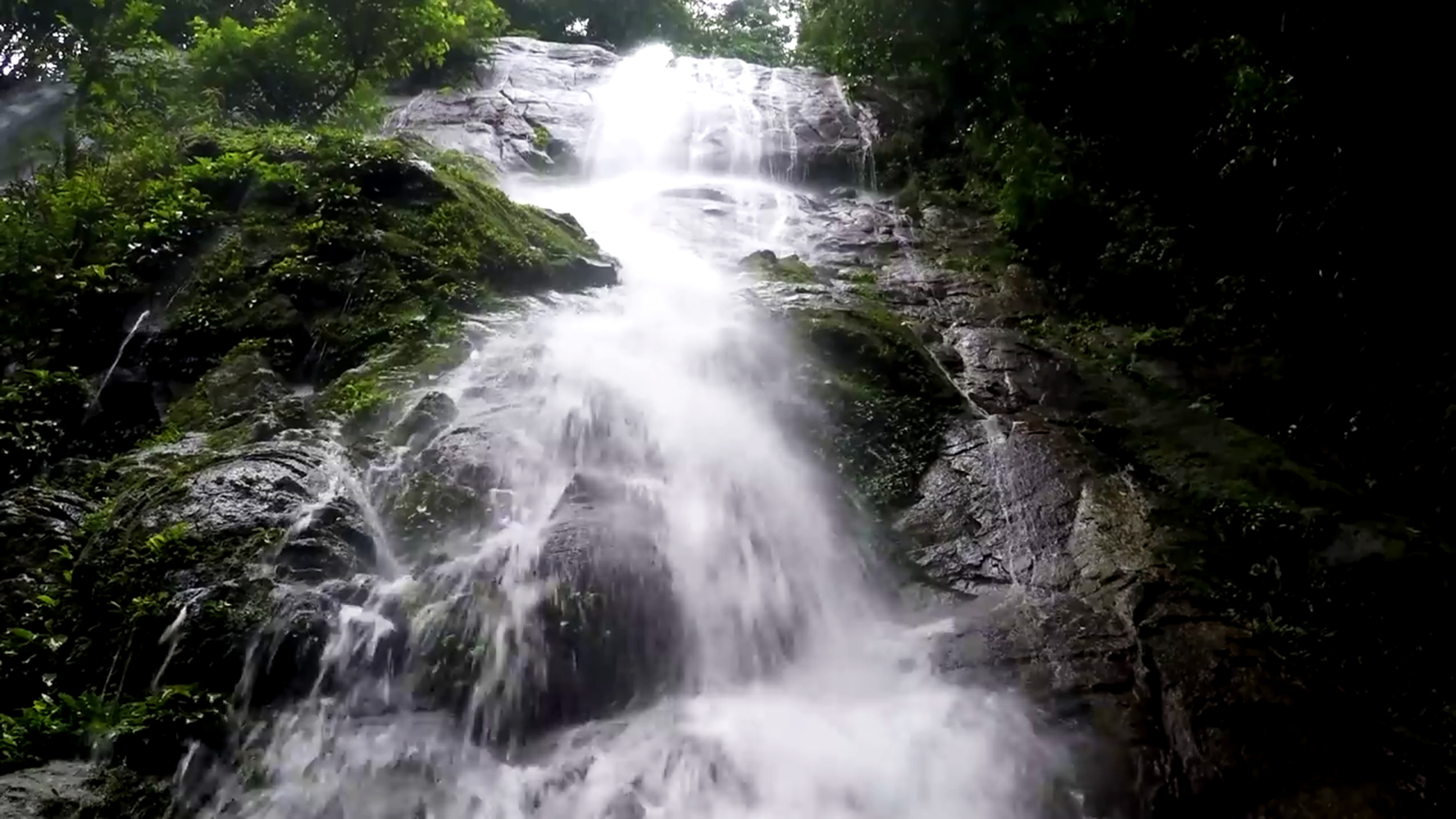
Falling Waters in KORUP National park

== Transport ==
Mundemba is accessible by car from Kumba via a dirt road. Public transportation is undertaken exclusively by Bush taxis, which run daily several trips to and from Kumba, Ekondo Titi and to a lesser extent (or on hire) other local destinations. The public road to Kumba is often in very bad condition during the rainy season (June–September) and may be impassable for some days. A "car park" (a.k.a. bush taxi station) is located near the soccer field, adjacent to the public market. Transportation within the town is either on foot or by local motorcycle taxis, referred to as okadas.

Transportation of goods to and from Calabar, Nigeria, is to a large extent undertaken by wooden motor-boats that depart from Mbulu Beach, a small port on Ndian River a few kilometers outside Mundemba. There is no customs here, however, so this is not a formal entry/exit point for tourists intending to reach Nigeria. Establishing a boat service for tourist transportation to and from Limbe via the impressive mangroves of the Rio del Rey has been long discussed but is currently not established. It is, however, possible (but not very straightforward) to arrange for such a trip from Limbe, which could be an interesting option for larger (nature-, birdwatcher) groups. During the raining season, the rural council truck helps to transport people freely to and from Mundemba to the near by villages along Toko sub division.

== Services and amenities ==
Large sections of Mundemba are connected to the electrical grid which is generated locally by petrol generators run by Eneo Cameroun SA (Energy of Cameroon). Similarly, many households have running water provided by SNEC (the Cameroonian State water provider). There are no telephone landlines but both major mobile telecommunication providers in Cameroon (MTN Group, Orange (brand)) and Nextel that offer network coverage in town. As of 2020 there is internet connection.

There is a police station, Gendarmerie and Army barracks in town. The main current Micro-finance within Mundemba include; Express Exchange and Express Union. In addition, there are other cooperatives that operate a branch in Mundemba where it is possible to carryout secured financial transactions as well as send or receive money within Cameroon through a money transfer system.

There is a public hospital in town and a PAMOL hospital a few kilometers outside the town. There are pharmacies in town that can provide basic medication.

Twice weekly (Wednesday and Saturday), there is a large market in town (next to the soccer field), where local produce and goods are sold. In addition, there are several small stores that sell daily basic amenities (i.e. rice, milk powder, coffee, beans, biscuits, local batteries, cans of sardines, bottled water).

The town is adopting western-style restaurants (especially at local hotels, based on previous arrangement). There are a few local eating places serving basic Cameroonian food and in the evening there are often street vendors selling goat meat, pork and beef skewers (called soya) or grilled fresh or (more typically) frozen fish. There are several drinking places servicing local Cameroonian and some Nigerian but no Western drinks except red wines and Scottish whiskies. You can also get all brands of Cameroonian, African and western music in Mundemba.

A Government nursery and primary school are located in town, as well as a grammar and a technical high school, and a teacher's college as well as other private schools. There are also a couple of denomination-affiliated primary schools in town.

== Lodging ==
There are a couple of places offering basic accommodation in town (with cold water and a fan). Many of the hotels and motels referred in travel guides can offer good services but expectations shouldn't be too high.
