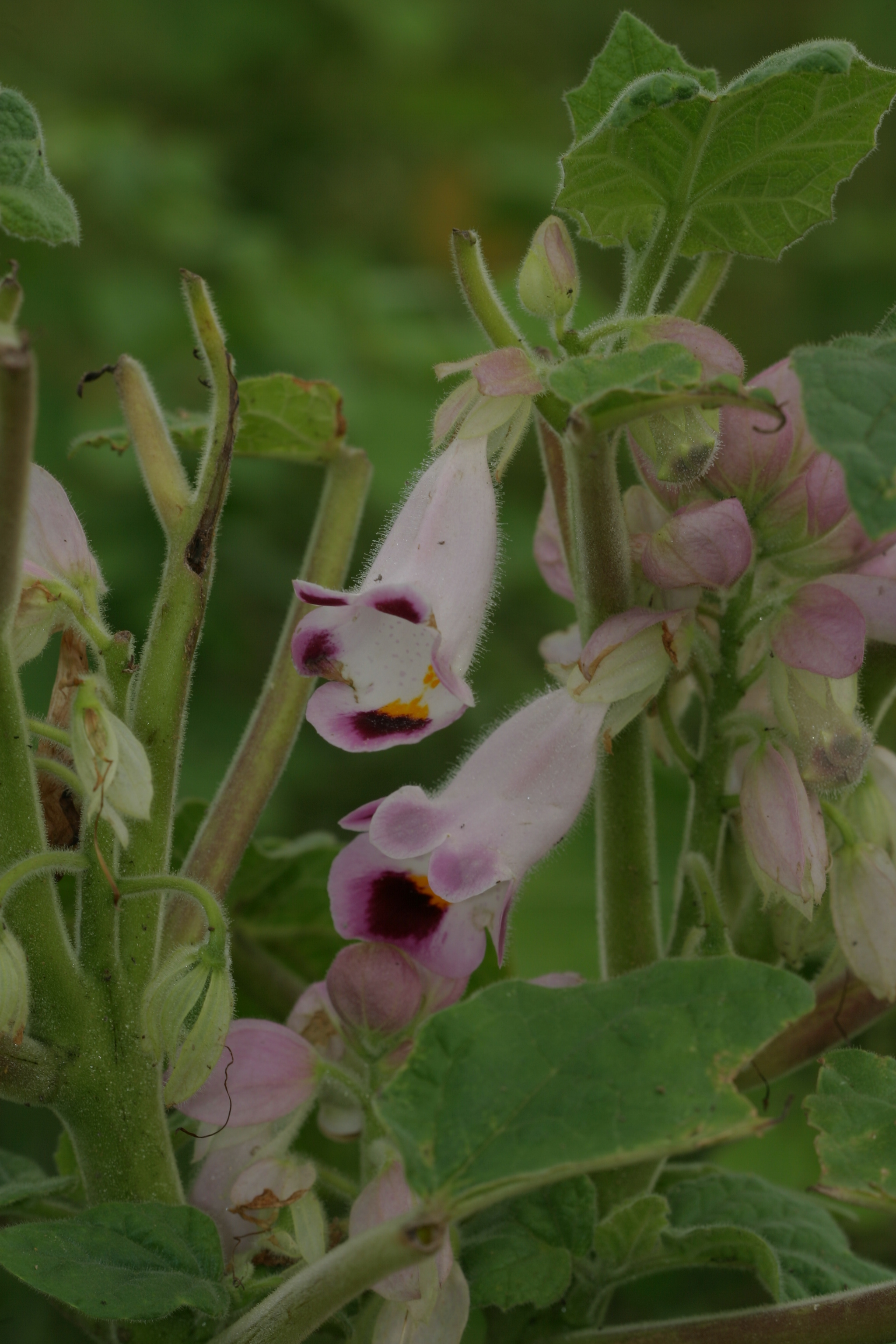
- The pendulous flowers of the plant

Scientific classification
- Kingdom: Plantae
- Clade: Embryophytes
- Clade: Tracheophytes
- Clade: Angiosperms
- Clade: Eudicots
- Clade: Asterids
- Order: Lamiales
- Family: Martyniaceae
- Genus: Martynia; L.
- Species: M. annua

Binomial name
- Martynia annua L.

Synonyms
- Martynia diandra Gloxin

= Martynia =

Genus of plants

Martynia is a monotypic genus in the Martyniaceae family consisting of a single species, Martynia annua L., which is commonly known as cat's claw, tiger's claw, iceplant. or Devil's claw. However, the name 'iceplant' may also refer to members of the unrelated plant family Aizoaceae.

It is native to Mexico, Central America and the Caribbean, and has been introduced throughout the tropics. It is now quite common in rural areas of India.

Martynia is used for making beads and ornaments, and has a history of folk medicine uses in the Indian subcontinent.

== Description ==
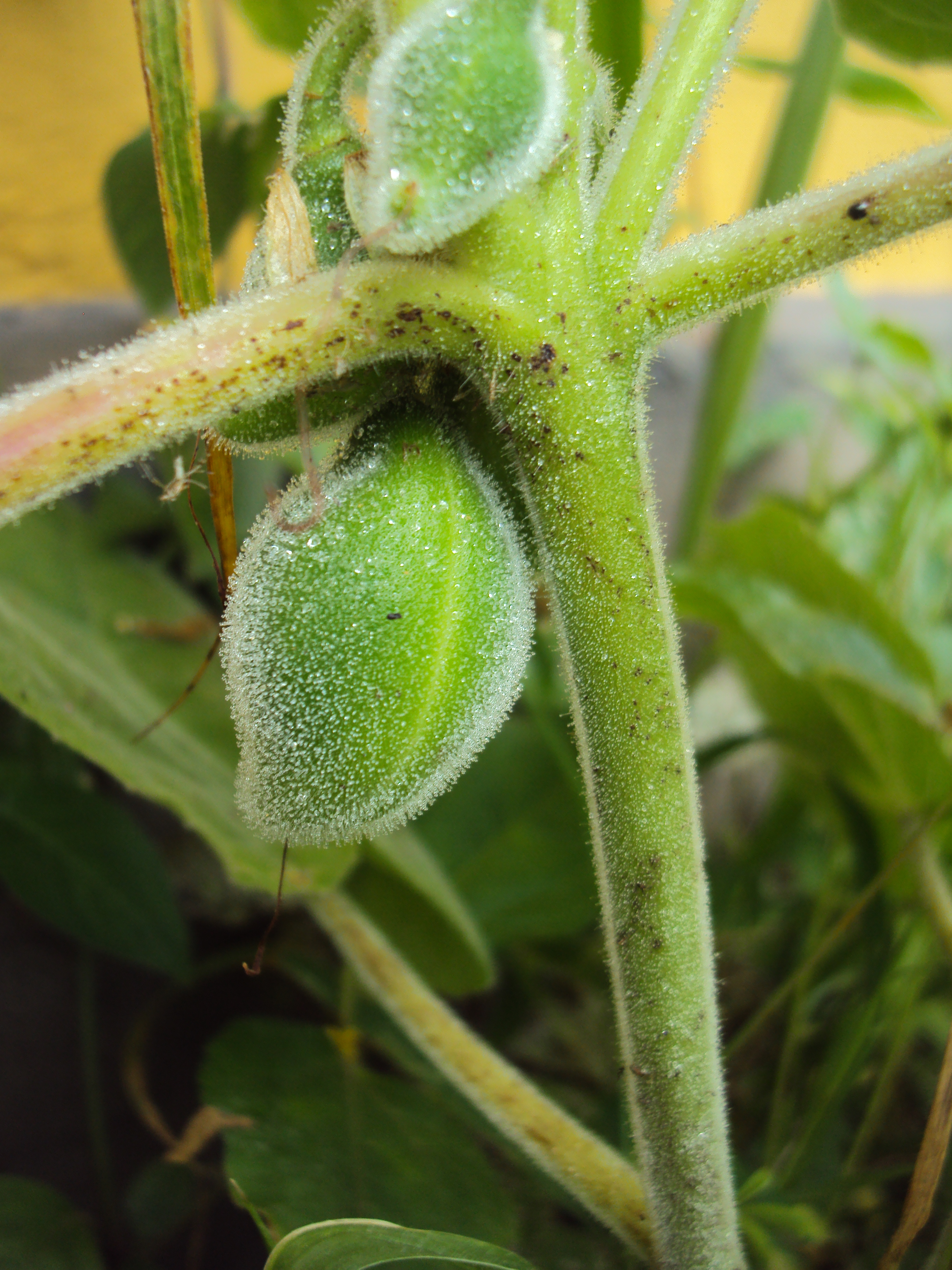
Hairy stem and branches with immature fruits of Martynia annua

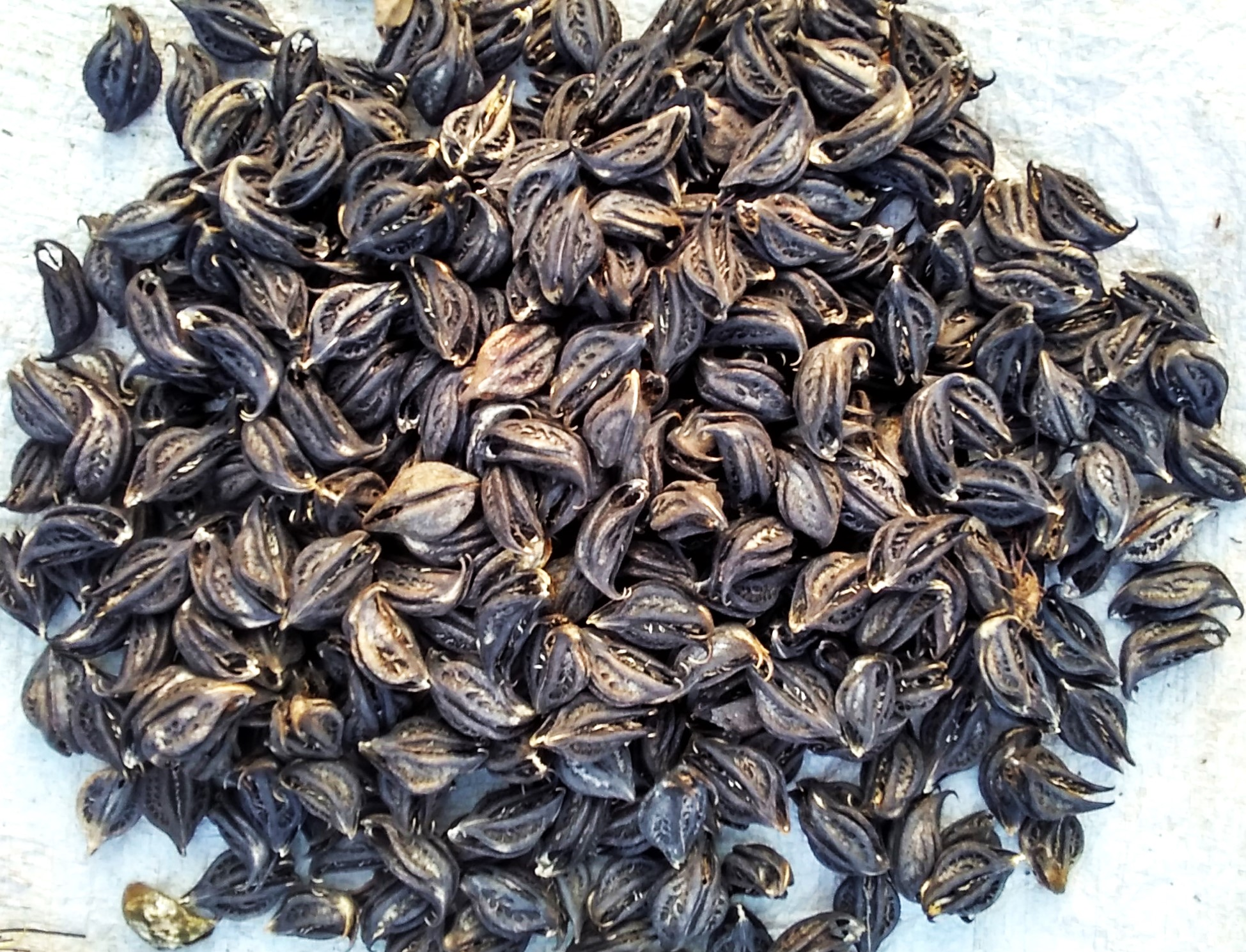
Martynia annua dried fruits

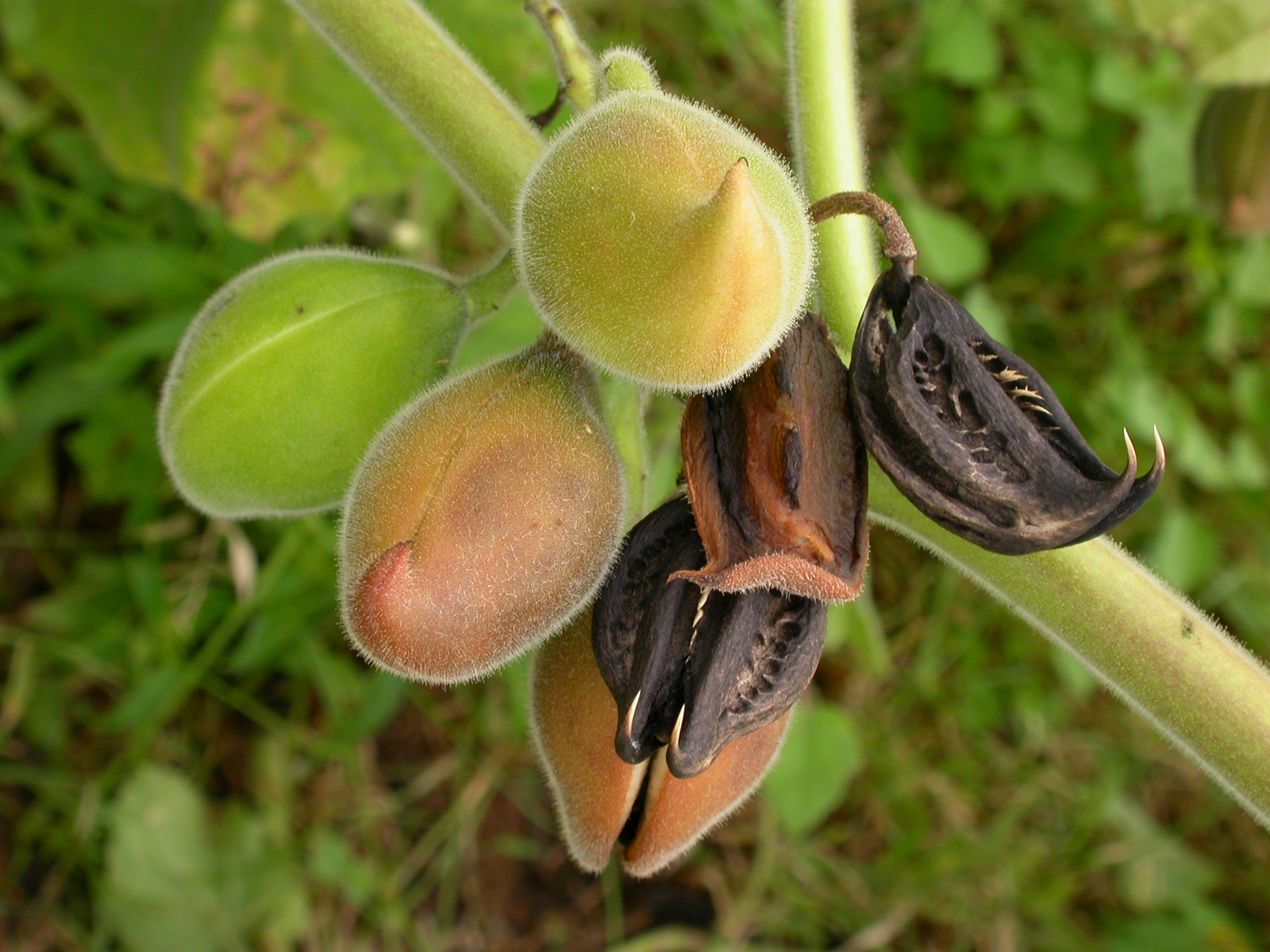
Developing Martynia annua and ripened black fruits, showing "cat's claw" tips

Martynia is an erect, somewhat shrubby annual plant about 1 metre (3.3 ft) tall, covered with glandular hairs, and has ovate, mucilaginous leaves 8–20 centimetres (3.1–7.9 in) wide and 6–19 centimetres (2.4–7.5 in) long. The leaves are opposite, and have red petioles. They resemble sticky rhubarb. Its flowers are pale pink and tubular, and have nectar guides and purple spots. Fruits become blackened when ripe and have hooked spines at the tip, lending their name "cat's claw" or "tiger's claw". They stick to animal fur and eventually the seeds fall out as the fruit gets crushed by the animal's feet.

== Taxonomy ==
The genus and species were first described by Carl Linnaeus in his 1753 publication, Species Plantarum, although the modern taxonomic definition may not correspond with the original Linnaeus description, instead being a synonym for Proboscidea louisianica (Miller) Thellung, as well as other names used in India.

Martynia was collected by the Scottish naval surgeon William Houstoun near Veracruz, Mexico. Houstoun sent seeds of this new plant to Philip Miller, chief gardener at the Chelsea Physic Garden, in 1731. Houstoun named the plant, Martynia, in honor of a professor of botany at Cambridge, John Martyn. The plant was described in Martyn's work Historia Plantarum Rariorum, with a full description and illustration.

Martyn gave the species the following descriptive name: Martynia annua villosa et viscosa, folio subrotundo, flore magno rubro. In India, it has several taxonomic synonyms and common names.

== Distribution ==
Martynia is widely naturalized across subtropical and tropical world regions, particularly in Central America and the Indian subcontinent. It is typically found in uncultivated fields and arable lands from plains to 1,500 metres (4,900 ft).

== Uses ==
The plant is used for making beads and other native ornaments. It has been applied for numerous supposed treatments in Ayurveda and Siddha folk medicine.
