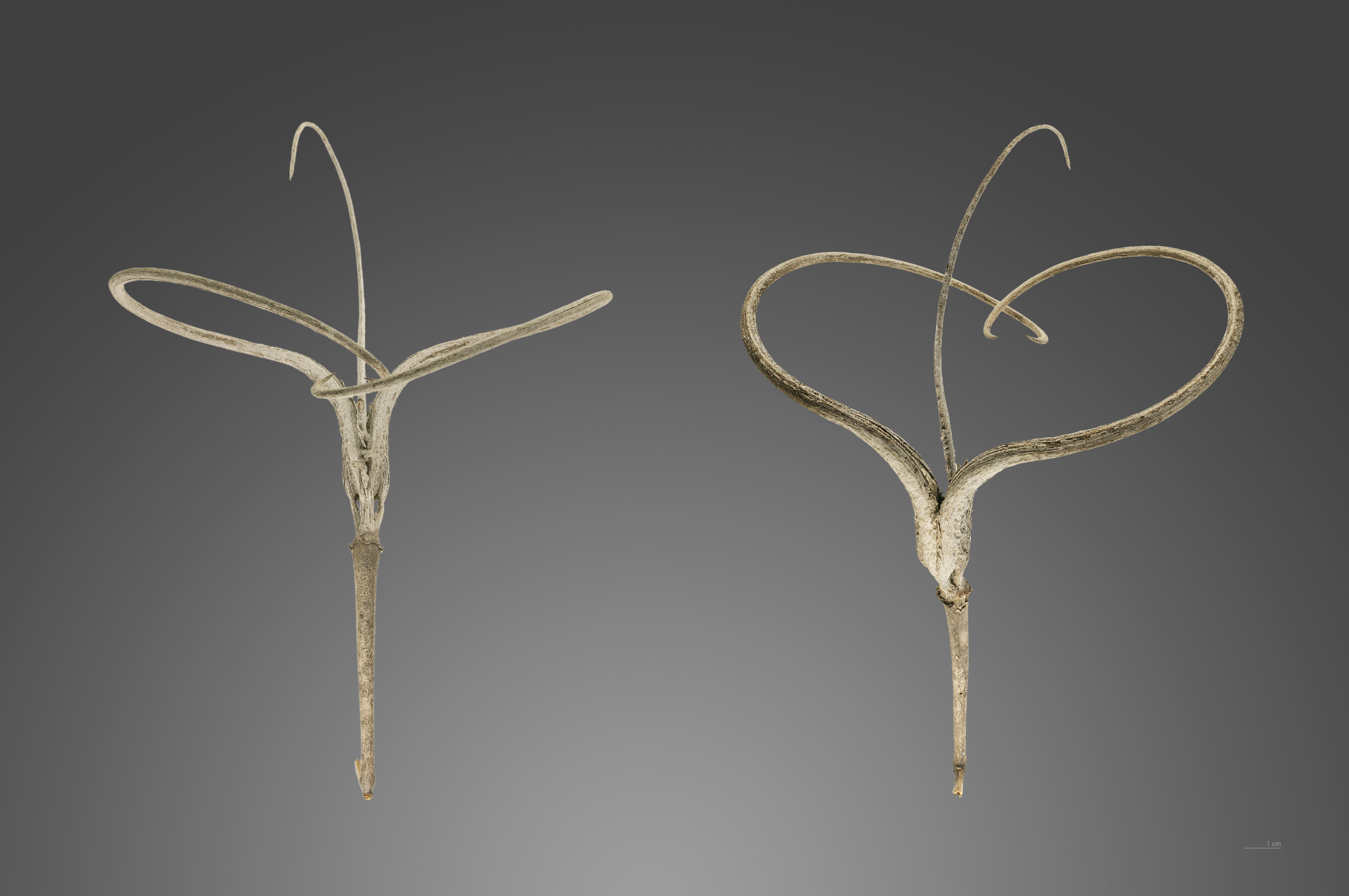
- Two views of the same capsule of P. althaeifolia

Scientific classification
- Kingdom: Plantae
- Clade: Tracheophytes
- Clade: Angiosperms
- Clade: Eudicots
- Clade: Asterids
- Order: Lamiales
- Family: Martyniaceae
- Genus: Proboscidea
- Species: P. althaeifolia

Binomial name
- Proboscidea althaeifolia (Benth.) Decne.

= Proboscidea althaeifolia =

Species of flowering plant

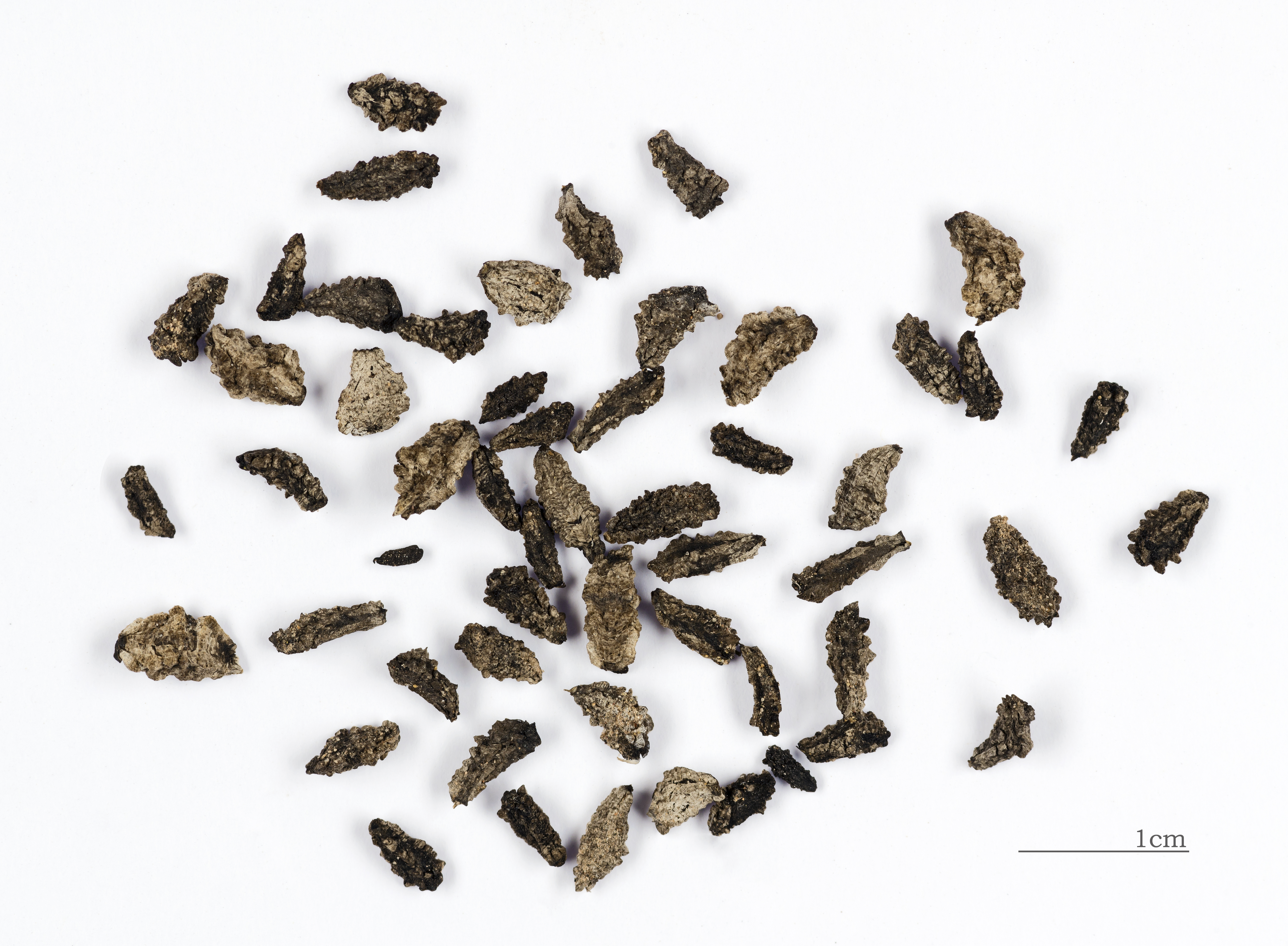
Seeds MHNT

Proboscidea althaeifolia is a species of flowering plant in the family Martyniaceae known by the common names desert unicorn-plant and yellow-flowered devil's claw. It is native to the desert southwest of the United States, where it grows in sandy habitat and blooms during the hot summer. This is a perennial herb growing from a thick, tuberlike yellow root. The stem is decumbent, creeping along the ground. The shiny leaves have rounded, oval, or roughly triangular blades up to 7 centimeters long which are deeply lobed and wavy along the edges. The inflorescence is an array of many showy, fragrant, bell-shaped flowers with five lobes flaring several centimeters wide. The flower is yellow to orange or apricot with an intricate pattern of speckles and streaks, its lower lobe lined with a nectar guide. The fruit is a large seed pod many centimeters long, a cylindrical body tapering into a very long, thin, curving tail. As the fruit dries the tail cracks open and splits into two hooked, claw-like halves. These hard, dry fruits were used as tools by local Native Americans.
