= Proboscidea spicata =

Scientific classification
- Kingdom: Plantae
- Clade: Tracheophytes
- Clade: Angiosperms
- Clade: Eudicots
- Clade: Asterids
- Order: Lamiales
- Family: Martyniaceae
- Genus: Proboscidea
- Species: P. spicata

Binomial name
- Proboscidea spicata Correll

Species of flowering plant

Proboscidea spicata, the New Mexico unicorn-plant, is a herbaceous, flowering plant.

== Distribution ==
Proboscidea spicata occurs in southwest regions of Texas, and southeastern parts of New Mexico.

== Habitat and ecology ==
Proboscidea spicata is adapted to live in dry, sandy soil. This plant does not need much water to survive. It prefers alluvial soils. It is native to areas such as New Mexico and Texas. It is a critically imperiled species.

== Morphology ==
Proboscidea spicata has a vine like appearance. The stems of this flower are sticky and covered in hairs.

== Flowers and fruit ==
Flowers of Proboscidea spicata have five petals that are purple. They have bright yellow pistils.
