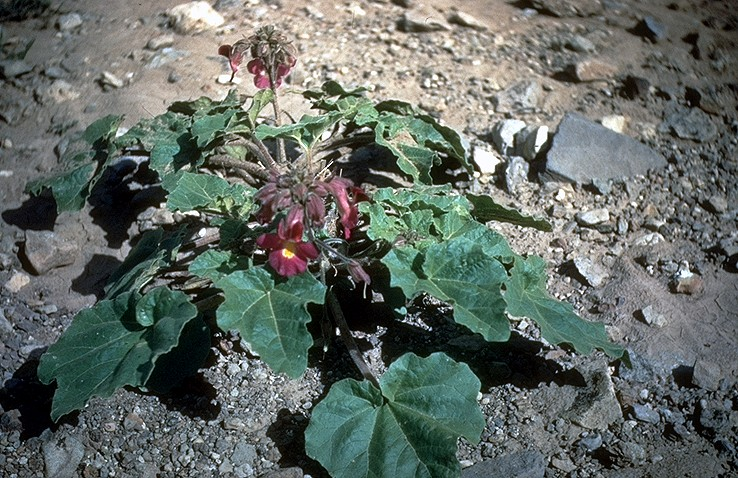

Scientific classification
- Kingdom: Plantae
- Clade: Embryophytes
- Clade: Tracheophytes
- Clade: Angiosperms
- Clade: Eudicots
- Clade: Asterids
- Order: Lamiales
- Family: Martyniaceae
- Genus: Proboscidea
- Species: P. parviflora

Binomial name
- Proboscidea parviflora (Woot.) Woot. & Standl.

= Proboscidea parviflora =

Species of flowering plant

Proboscidea parviflora is a species of flowering plant in the family Martyniaceae known by the common names doubleclaw and red devil's-claw. It is native to the desert southwest of the United States and northern Mexico, where it grows in sandy, dry, and disturbed habitat and blooms during the hot summer. This is an annual herb growing from a taproot and producing sprawling, spreading stems. The leaves have rounded, oval, or roughly triangular blades up to 15 centimeters (6 in) long which have smooth edges or faint lobes or teeth. The inflorescence is an array of several showy bell-shaped flowers with five lobes flaring several centimeters wide. The flower is white to pink or purple, sometimes with mottling or lines of spots in the throat, and often a purple blotch on the upper lip. A yellow nectar guide extends along the lower lip. The fruit is a large seed pod many centimeters long, a cylindrical body tapering into a very long, thin, curving tail. As the fruit dries the tail cracks open and splits into two hooked, claw-like halves. The young fruits and seeds were used for food and the dark-colored hardened dry fruits were used in basketry by local Native Americans.

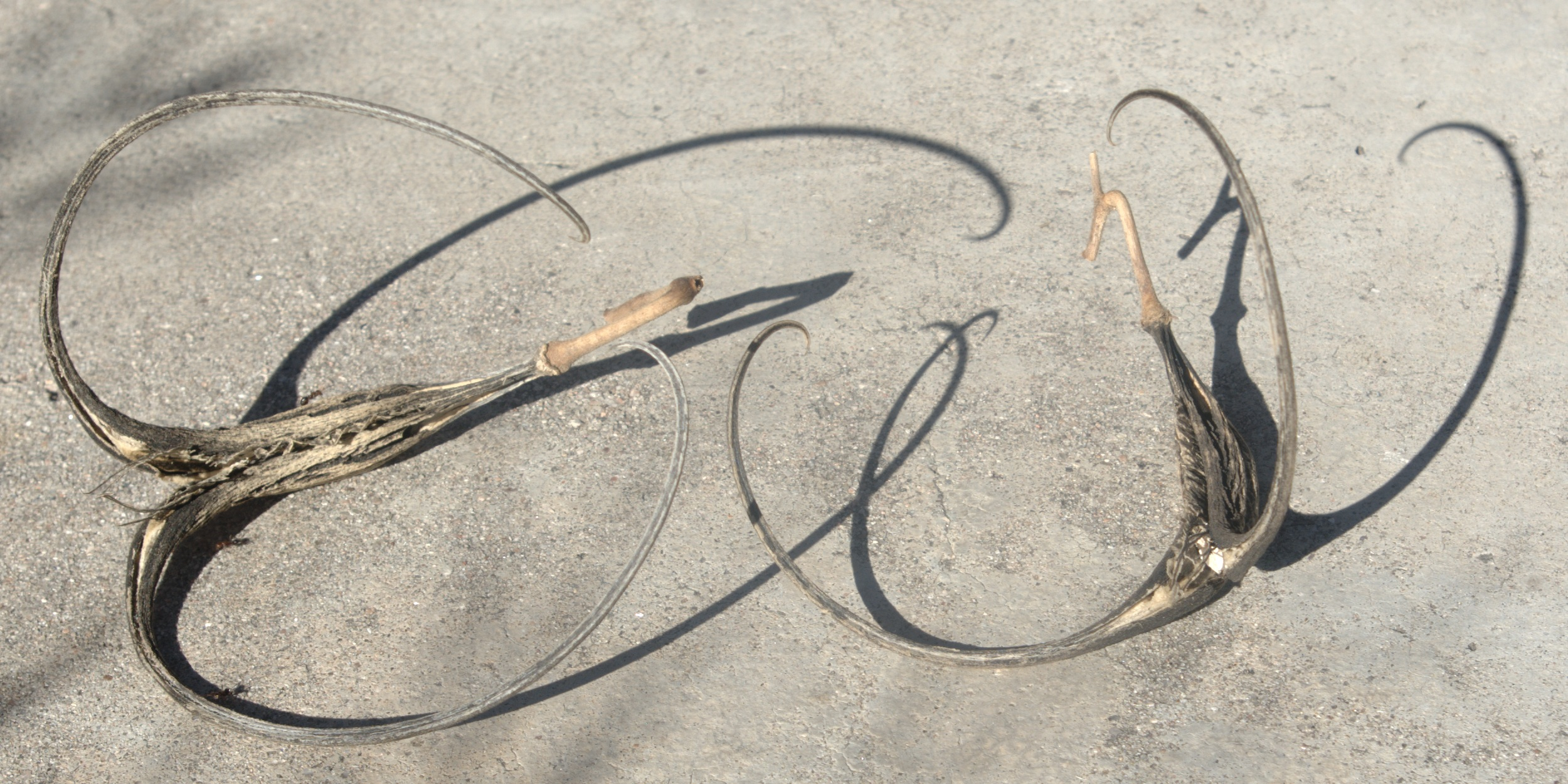
dry fruits

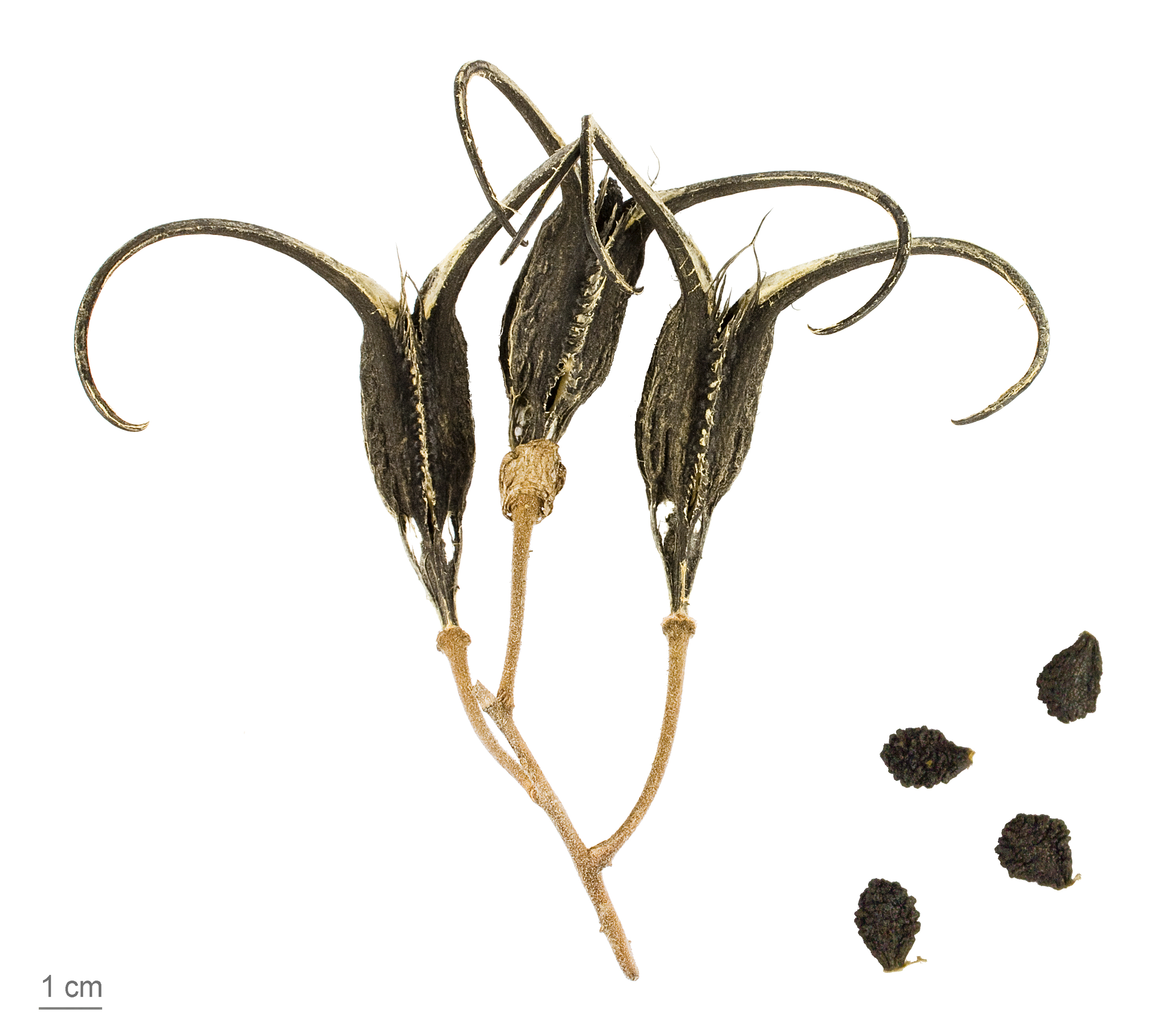
Proboscidea parviflora - MHNT
