= Proboscidea sabulosa =

Conservation status
- Vulnerable (NatureServe)

Scientific classification
- Kingdom: Plantae
- Clade: Tracheophytes
- Clade: Angiosperms
- Clade: Eudicots
- Clade: Asterids
- Order: Lamiales
- Family: Martyniaceae
- Genus: Proboscidea
- Species: P. sabulosa

Binomial name
- Proboscidea sabulosa Correll

Species of flowering plant

Proboscidea sabulosa is a species of flowering plant in the family Martyniaceae known by the common names sanddune unicorn-plant, dune unicorn plant and dune devil's claw. It is native to Chihuahua in Mexico and New Mexico and Texas in the United States.

This annual herb has large sticky oval-shaped leaves which are strongly scented and dark green in color. The plant grows up to about 40 centimeters tall. The tubular flowers are cream-colored with purple spots. The large fruit is woody and has two curved appendages. When it is dry, the appendages help it attach to the feet of animals. It contains seeds about one centimeter long.

This plant grows in sandy habitat dominated by Havard oaks and Chihuahuan Desert scrub. It is much more common in wet years. It is associated with Abronia fragrans, Andropogon hallii, Artemisia filifolia, Cenchrus incertus, Chloris cucullata, Heliotropium convolvulaceum, Oryzopsis hymenoides, Palafoxia sphacelata, Prosopis glandulosa, Sporobolus giganteus, Sporobolus cryptandrus, and Yucca elata.

Native American groups used the young fruits for food and the dry fruits in basketry.
