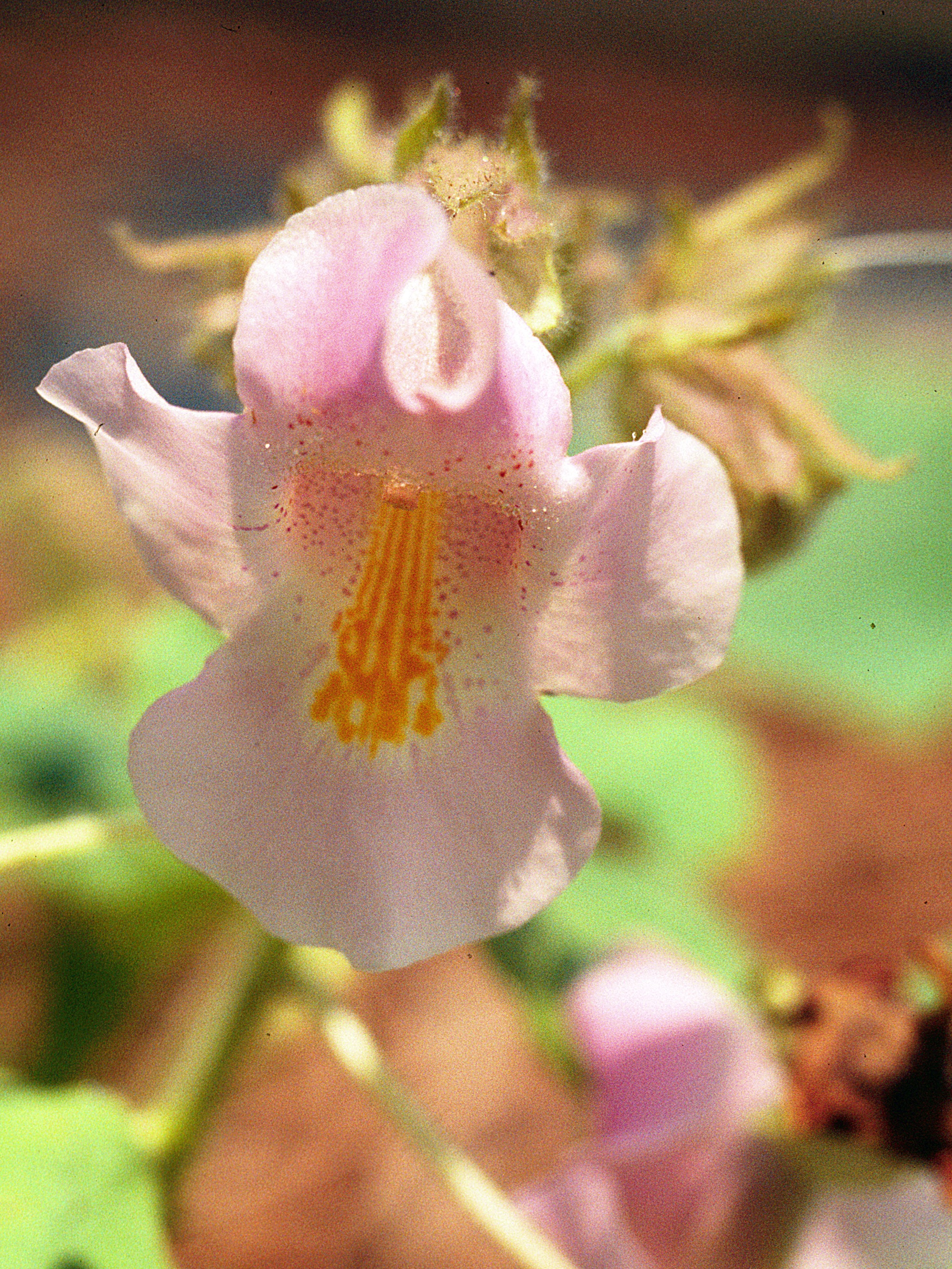

Scientific classification
- Kingdom: Plantae
- Clade: Tracheophytes
- Clade: Angiosperms
- Clade: Eudicots
- Clade: Asterids
- Order: Lamiales
- Family: Martyniaceae
- Genus: Proboscidea
- Species: P. louisianica

Binomial name
- Proboscidea louisianica (Mill.) Thell.

Subspecies
- P. louisianica subsp. fragrans; P. louisianica subsp. louisianica

Synonyms
- Martynia louisianica Mill.

= Proboscidea louisianica =

Species of flowering plant

Proboscidea louisianica is a species of flowering plant in the family Martyniaceae. Its true native range is unclear, but probably includes parts of the southwestern United States and Mexico in North America. It occurs in other areas, including other regions in North America, Europe, Australia, and South Africa, as an introduced species. It is the most widely distributed species in its family. Common names it shares with other Proboscidea species include devil's claw and unicorn-plant. Names more specific to the species include common devil's claw, ram's horn, aphid trap, Louisiana unicorn-plant, purple-flowered devil's-claw, goat's head, elephant tusks, and martinoe (or martina).

== Description ==
The plant is an annual herb with spreading stems up to about 900 cm (29 ft 6 in) long. The oppositely arranged ovate leaves have blades up to 30 cm (12 in) wide. The herbage is coated in glandular hairs carrying tiny oil droplets, making the plant feel oily to the touch and giving it a strong scent. The essential oil vaporizes into the air, and gives the landscape a "distinct acrid odor". The lobed flower corolla is lavender, "purple-cream", yellowish with purple spots, or "dull white to somewhat pinkish purple" with yellowish nectar guides and with or without purple blotches. One plant can produce up to 80 fruits. The fruit is a dehiscent capsule up to 10 cm (3.9 in) long with a long, narrow, curving beak. As the fruit dries and the flesh falls away, the hard beak splits into two horns. The horns can be up to 30 cm (12 in) long. The fruit can contain black or white seeds; white-seeded plants are more common in cultivation. The seeds can be over 43% oil.

== Ecology ==
The plant rarely self-pollinates. It is pollinated by bees; species noted on the plant include Melissodes communis, Svastra obliqua, Anthophora occidentalis, Augochlorella striata, Bombus fervidus, Bombus pensylvanicus, and Lasioglossum species.

== Uses ==
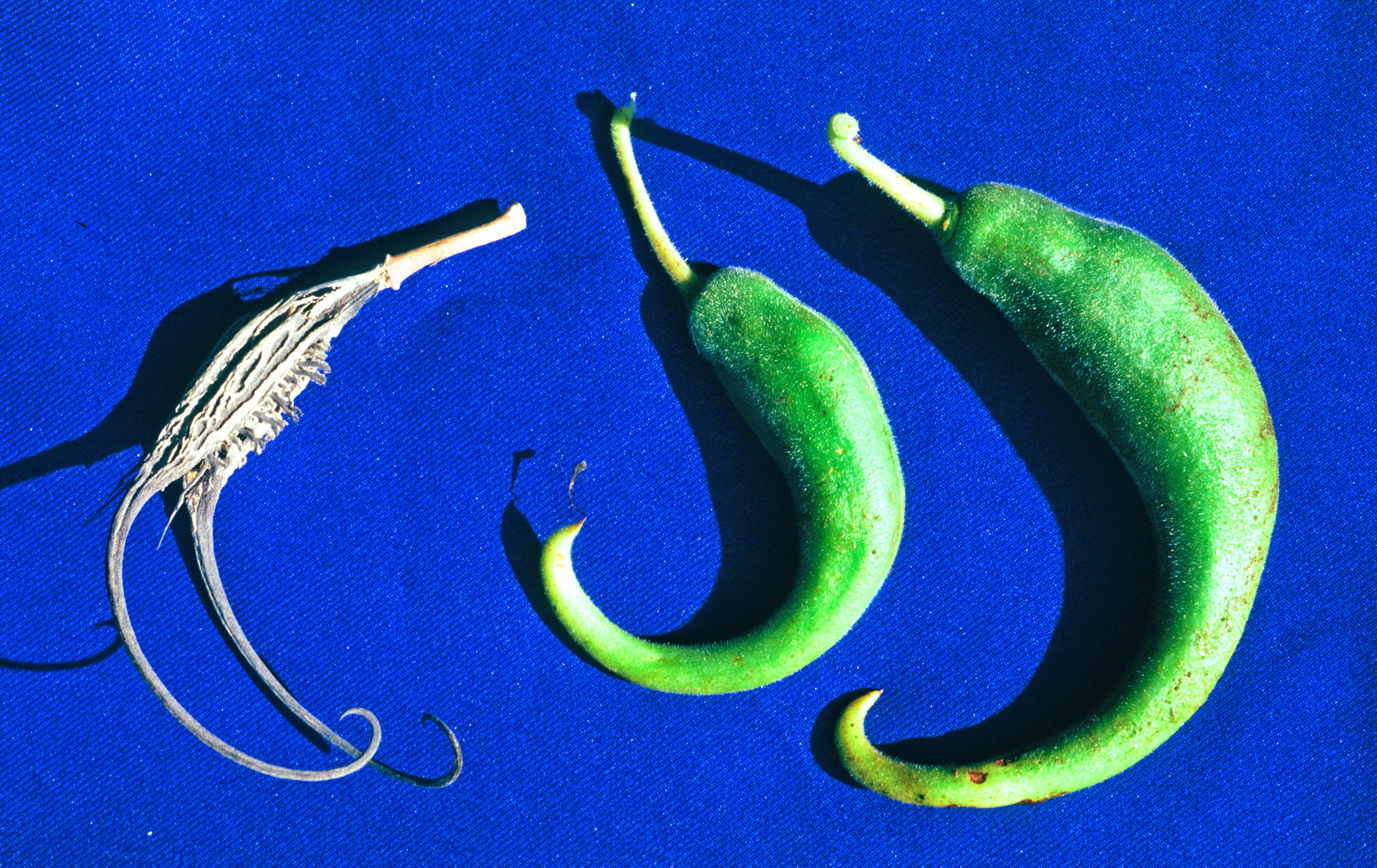
Dry and green fruit

The young green fruits are edible and can be pickled. The seeds were used as food by Native Americans.

Like those of other Proboscidea species, the dry fruits were very useful in Native American basketry. The dry horns could be incorporated into the baskets to form patterns, or used as sewing implements. They provided a black dye, especially when mixed with ash. Use of this species in basketry has been recorded among the Hopi, Apache, Havasupai, and Kawaiisu. The Tohono O'odham domesticated the species and used the dark dry fruit for the black-colored patterning in basketry designs. Many other groups probably cultivated and used it, but records of use rarely distinguish between the particular Proboscidea species utilized.

The plant is grown as an ornamental plant and a garden novelty, and it is used in floral arrangements. It is cultivated in a similar manner as okra.

== Impacts ==
The dry, hooked fruits attach to animals, and it has been suggested that the plant was introduced to South Africa by this means. The fruits are particularly suited for catching on "the fetlocks of ungulates".

The plant can be weedy, easily taking hold in disturbed habitat types and displaying a "preference for waste places". It occurs in pastures, cultivated fields, and feedlots. It is a weed of cotton crops known to cause drastic loss of fiber yields. Its strong essential oil appears to have an allelopathic effect on cotton plants, causing necrosis of the foliage. The weed is resistant to many herbicides used in cotton, and control options include hoeing by hand.
