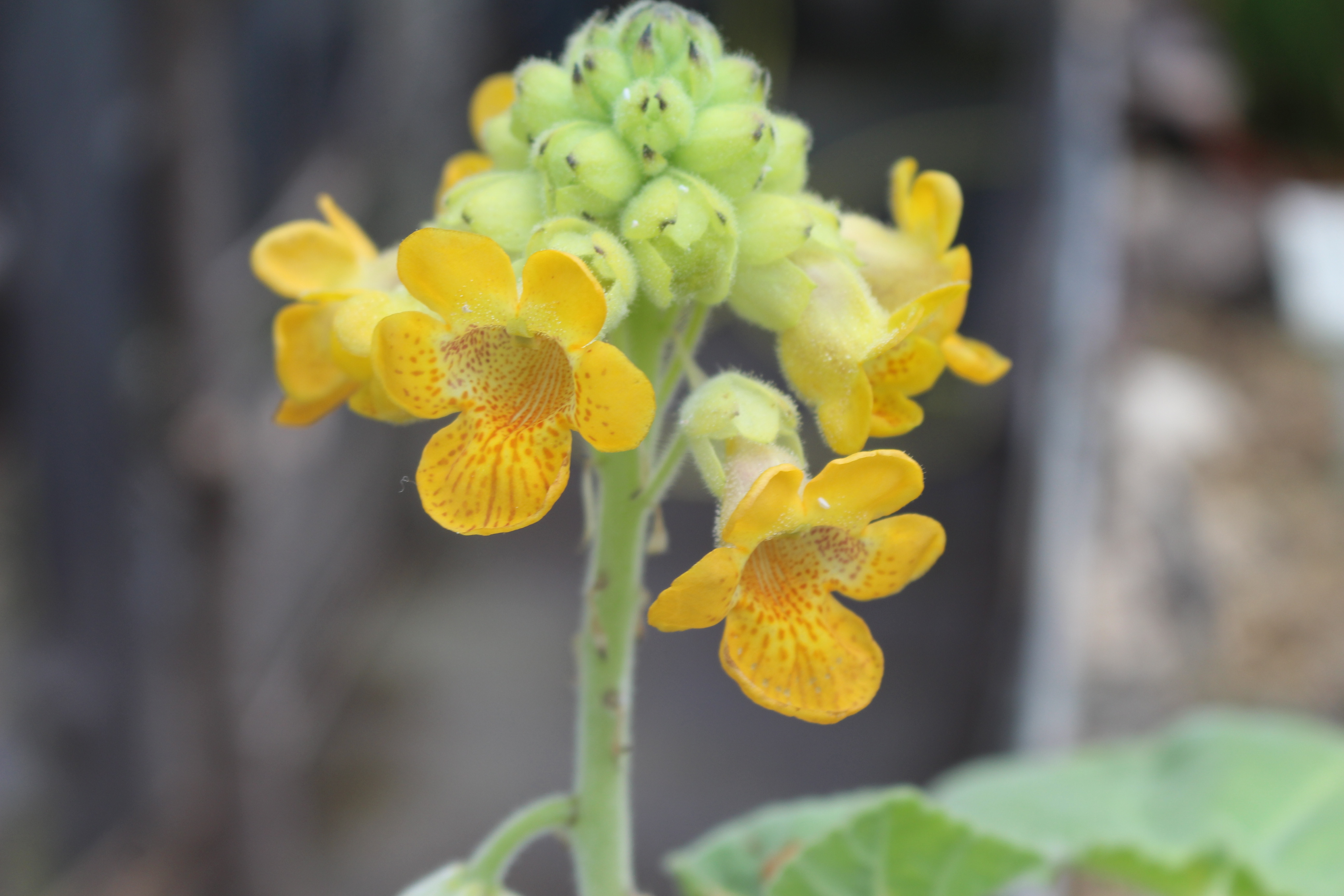
- Ibicella lutea flowers

Scientific classification
- Kingdom: Plantae
- Clade: Tracheophytes
- Clade: Angiosperms
- Clade: Eudicots
- Clade: Asterids
- Order: Lamiales
- Family: Martyniaceae
- Genus: Ibicella; Van Eselt.

Species
- See text

= Ibicella =

Genus of carnivorous plants

Ibicella is a genus of flowering plants in the Martyniaceae family. It was first described by the American Botanist Glen Parker Van Eseltine in 1929. The two species are annuals which occur in South America in parts of Brazil, Paraguay, Bolivia, Argentina. Plants may be long-lived, start growing erect but usually fall over under their own weight and can rarely be up to 1 m in length. The inflorescences emerge in terminal racemes with many yellow flowers which can be covered in orange patterns serving as nectar guides for pollinators. As typical for the Martyniaceae family, Ibicella also has hook-shaped capsule fruits.

== Species include ==
- Ibicella lutea (Lindl.) Van Eselt.
- Ibicella parodii Abbiatti

== Gallery ==
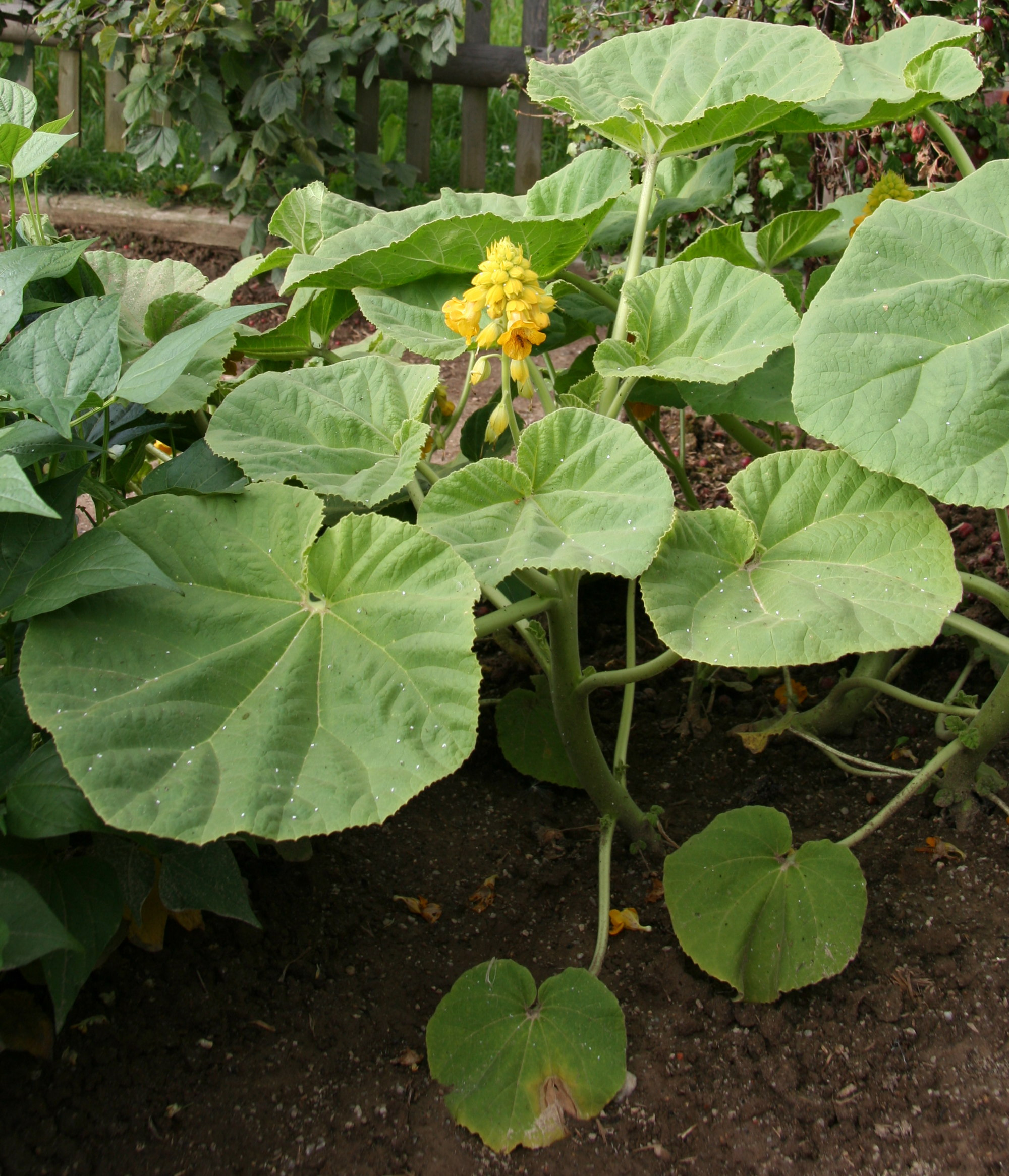
Ibicella lutea.

Ibicella parodii MERL

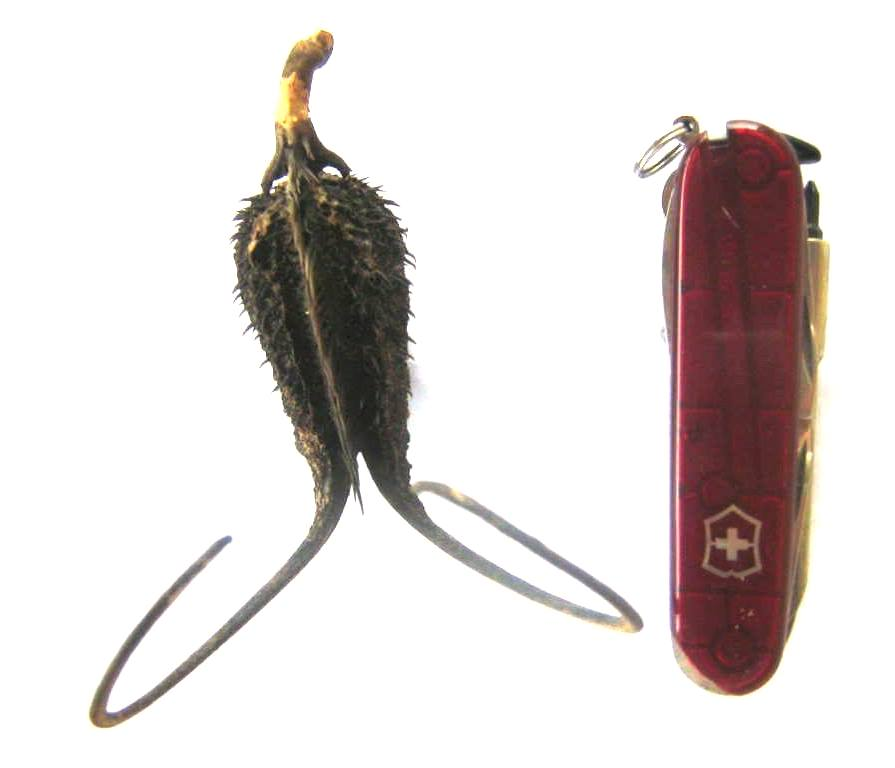
Claw-shaped fruit of Ibicella lutea with an Swiss Army knife for size comparison.
