= Glen Parker Van Eseltine =

American botanist and researcher

Glen Parker Van Eseltine (1888–1938) was an American botanist and researcher.

== Biography ==
He was born on October 21, 1888, in Syracuse, New York. After his graduation in 1913 he became an aid in the U.S. National Herbarium in Washington. Two years later he started working as assistant in the Office of Foreign Seed and Plant Introductions of the U.S. Department of Agriculture (USDA). During this period he married his wife Florence M. Lamb of Meridian, New York, with whom he had three children. He held this assistant position till 1919 when he became assistant botanist. Until 1922 and during the time of World War I, he was active in food work for the USDA. After returning to Syracuse he took a teaching position at North High School till 1927. Returning to a scientific position he then joined New York State Agricultural Experiment Station, Geneva, New York. In the years 1926, 1928–1929 he was also listed on the faculty of Syracuse University Summer School. After a heart attack on November 14, 1938 he passed away.

== Works ==
Flowers of crabapple cultivar 'Van Eseltine'

His work was centered around taxonomic botany, regarding economically and horticulturally important plants. He was involved in writing of several government publications and contributed to scientific journals. The angiosperm genus Ibicella was first described by him in 1929 and was published in the Technical Bulletin of the New York State Agricultural Experiment Station, Geneva, New York. He build a large collection Carex specimen over a period of 25 years which was later given to the Washington State Herbarium. During his time in Geneva, New York (1930) he made subsequent crosses of several crabapple species to develop a new ornamental cultivar. This cultivar with pink double flowers was later published in 1941 and named after him 'Van Eseltine'.

=== List of select works ===
- An Abnormal Specimen of Citrullus Vulgaris. (1915)
- Allies of Selaginella Rupestris in Southeastern United States (1918)
- Vegetables of New York (1928)

== Gallery ==
Publication of van Eseltine, Korean Lespedeza - a new forage crop.

Crabapple variety 'Van Eseltine'.

Fruits of Malus x 'Van Eseltine'.
