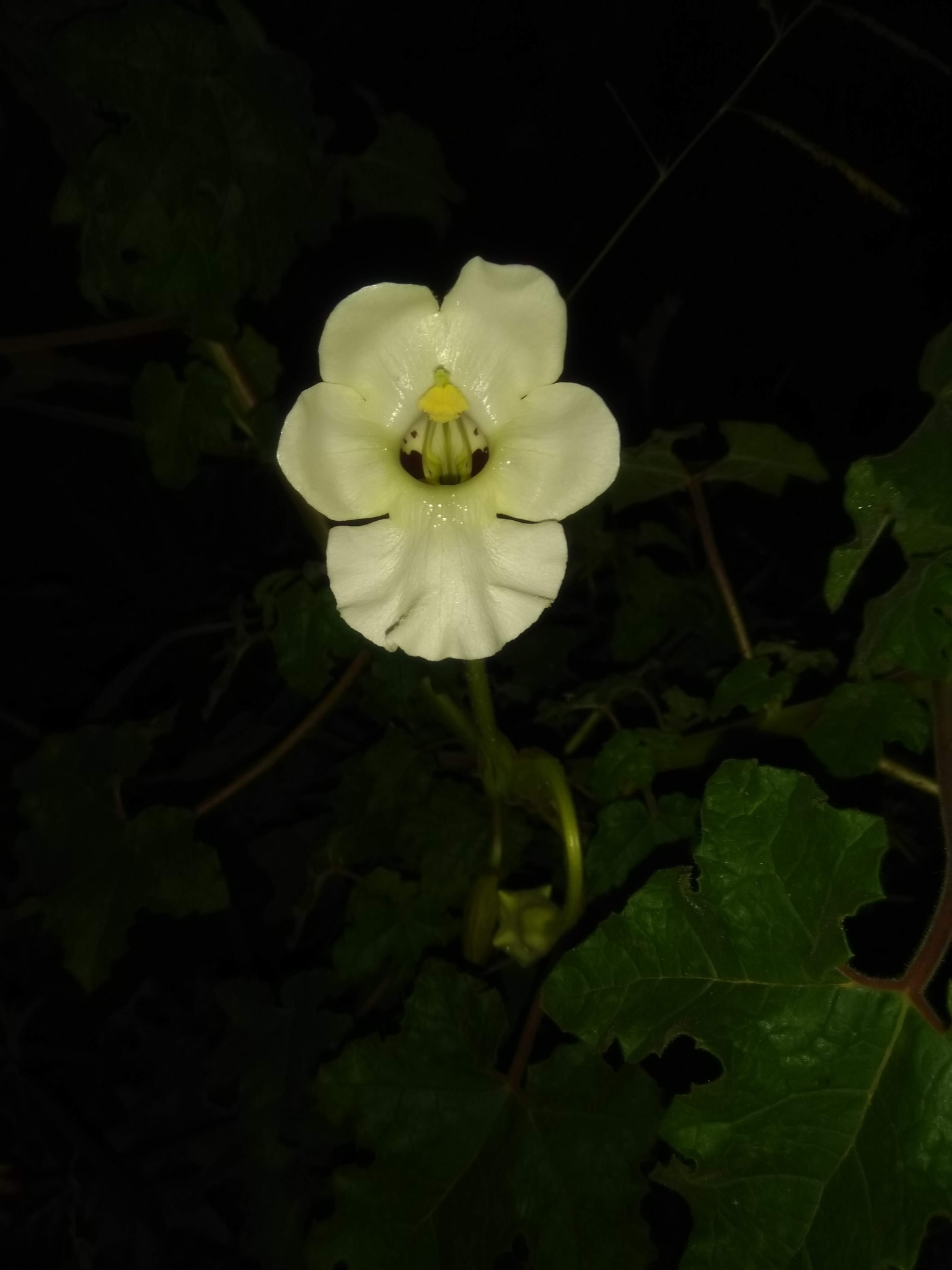
- Craniolaria annua

Scientific classification
- Kingdom: Plantae
- Clade: Tracheophytes
- Clade: Angiosperms
- Clade: Eudicots
- Clade: Asterids
- Order: Lamiales
- Family: Martyniaceae
- Genus: Craniolaria; L.

Species
- See text

= Craniolaria =

Genus of flowering plants

Craniolaria is a genus of flowering plants in the family Martyniaceae.

There are 3 species:

- Craniolaria annua
- Craniolaria argentina
- Craniolaria integrifolia
