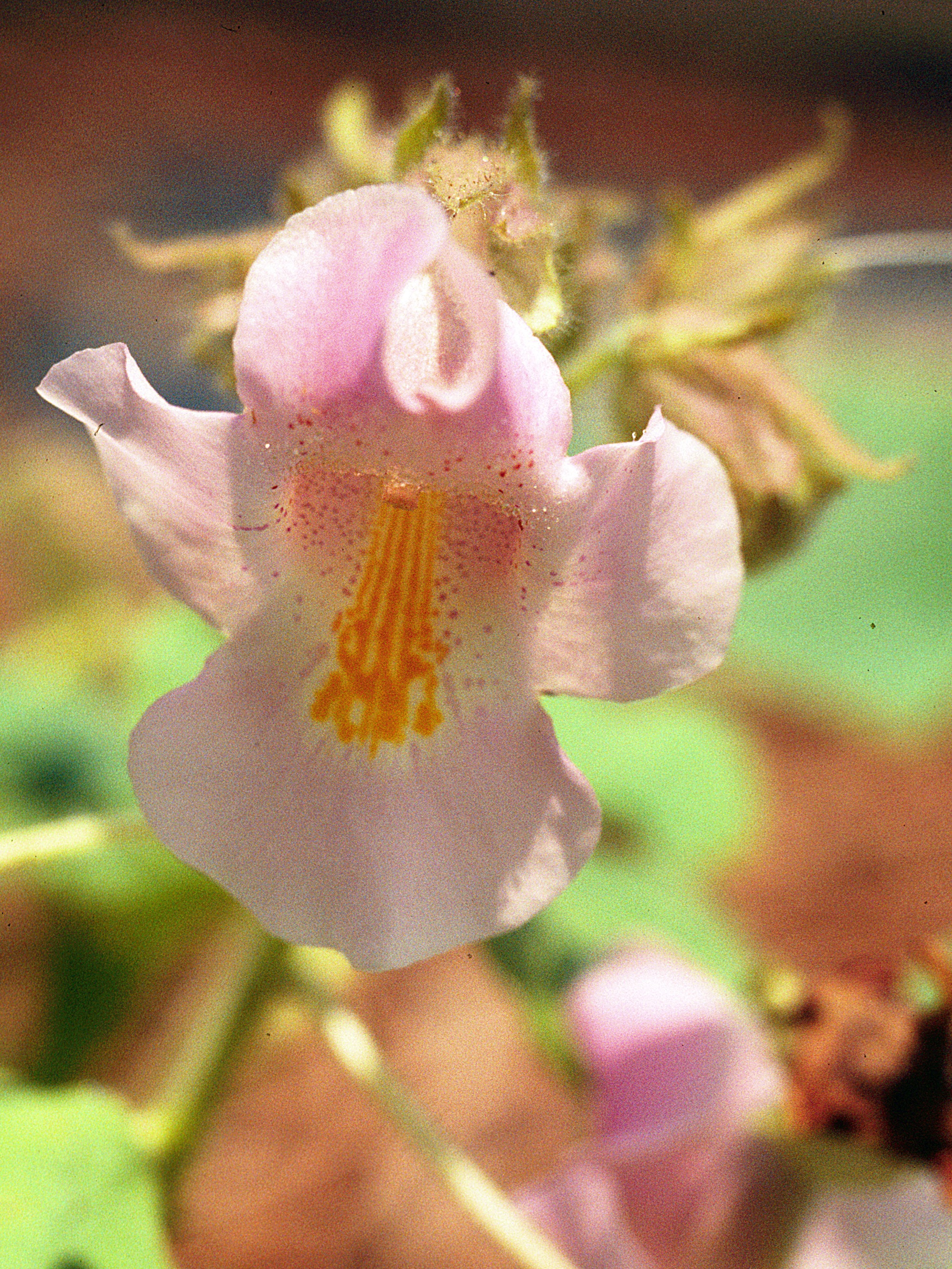
- Proboscidea louisianica

Scientific classification
- Kingdom: Plantae
- Clade: Tracheophytes
- Clade: Angiosperms
- Clade: Eudicots
- Clade: Asterids
- Order: Lamiales
- Family: Martyniaceae
- Genus: Proboscidea; Schmidel

Species
- See text

= Proboscidea (plant) =

Genus of plants

Proboscidea is a genus of flowering plant in the family Martyniaceae, some of whose species are known as devil's claw, devil's horn, ram's horn, or unicorn plant. The plants produce long, hooked seed pods. The hooks catch on the feet of animals, and as the animals walk, the pods are ground or crushed open, dispersing the seeds. The name devil's claw is shared with the South African plant Harpagophytum procumbens.

== Uses ==
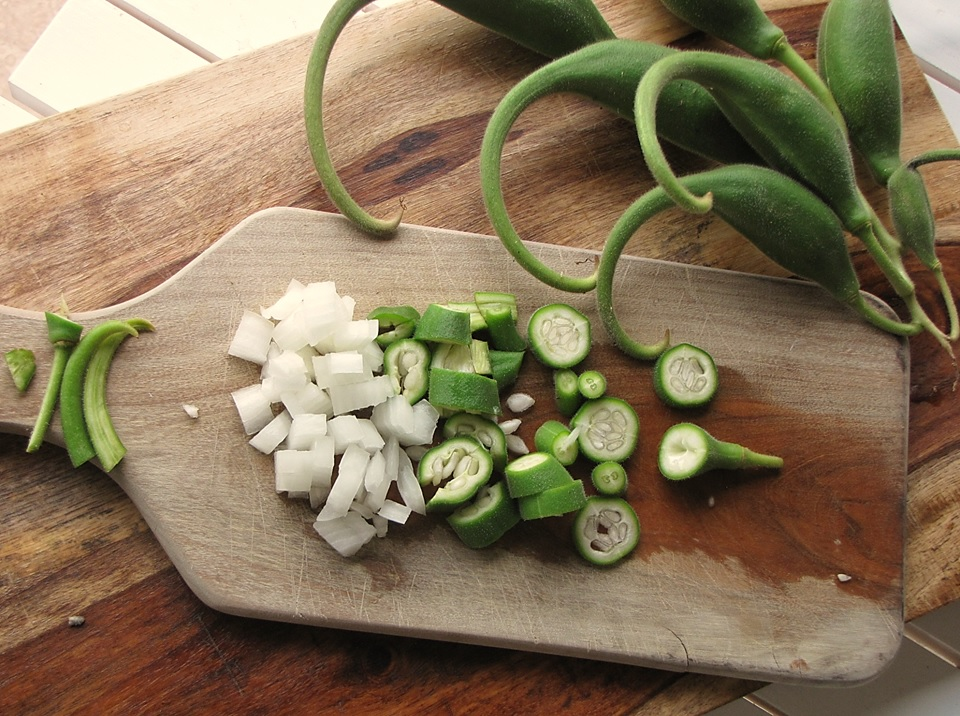
Unripe pods of Proboscidea parviflora chopped with onions on a cutting board.

The fruits of all species are edible before they ripen and become woody. They can be steamed and eaten much like okra. Some species (particularly Proboscidea parviflora) are used in basket weaving by the Tohono O'odham who have selected for varieties with longer "claws." The Chemehuevi also use devil's claw pods in basketry. The Hia C-eḍ Oʼodham and the Tohono O'odham eat the seeds, which provided an important source of dietary oils. Proboscidea parviflora was also used as a remedy for rheumatism.

== Species ==
Species include:

- Proboscidea althaeifolia - devil's horn, devil's claw, or desert unicorn plant
- Proboscidea louisianica - ram's horn
- Proboscidea parviflora - doubleclaw, (red) devil's claw
- Proboscidea sabulosa - dune unicorn plant
- Proboscidea spicata - New Mexico unicorn plant

Proboscidea lutea is a synonym of Ibicella lutea.

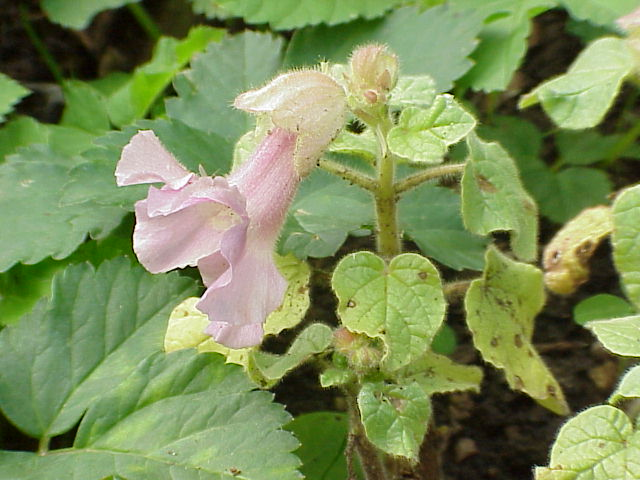
P. louisianica

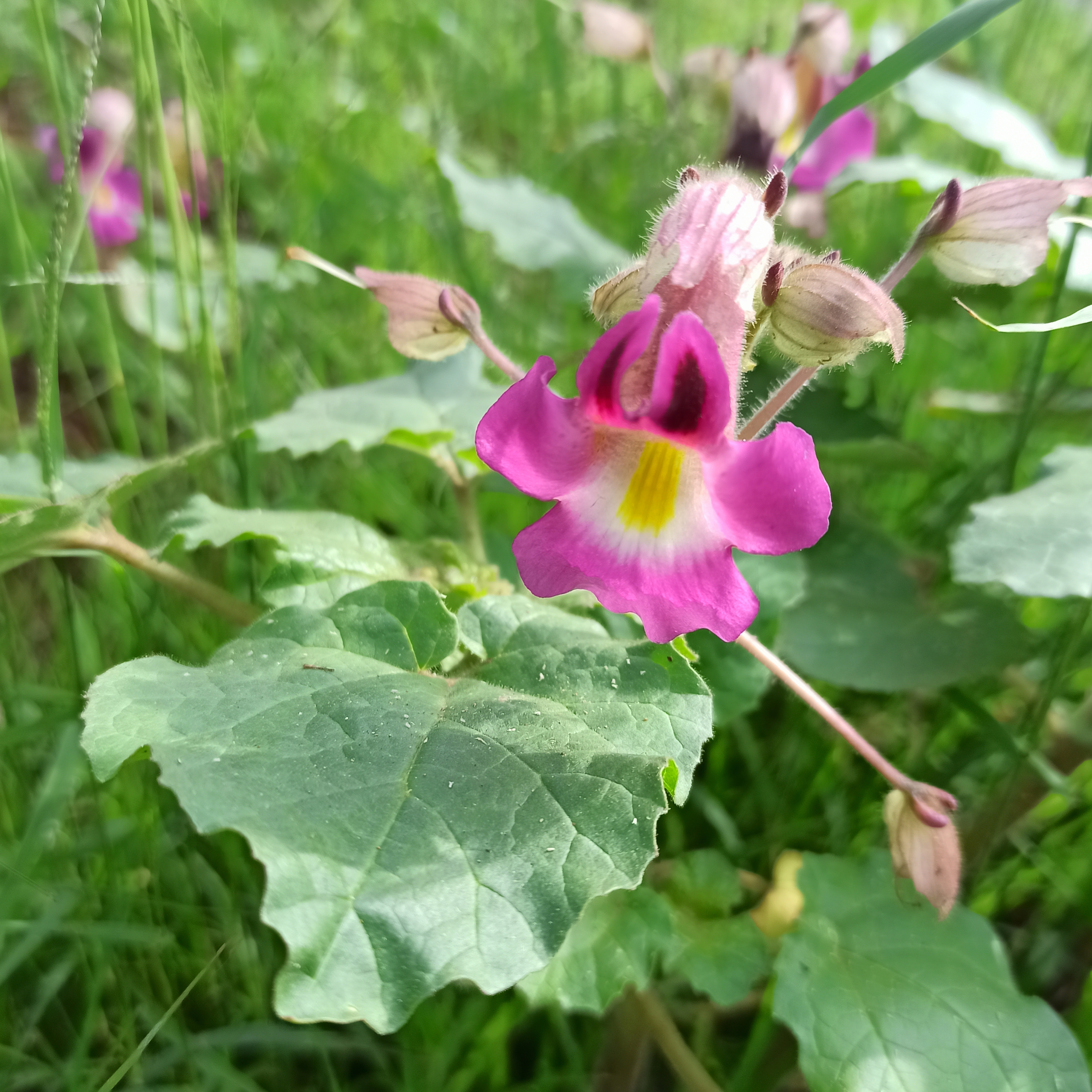
P. louisianica ssp. fragans

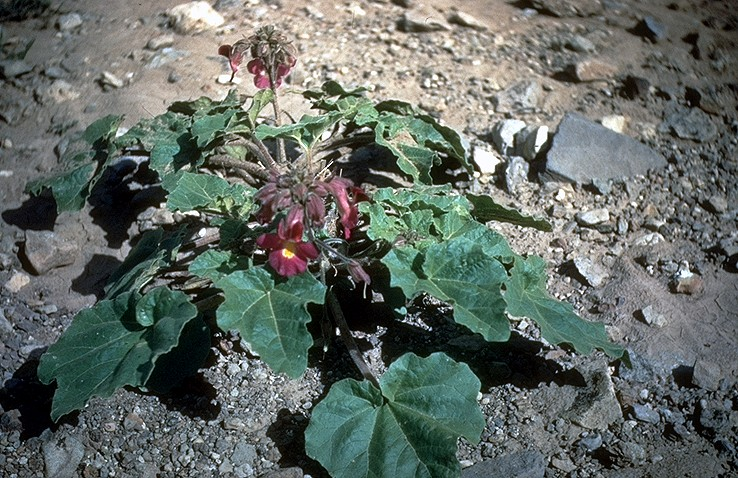
P. parviflora

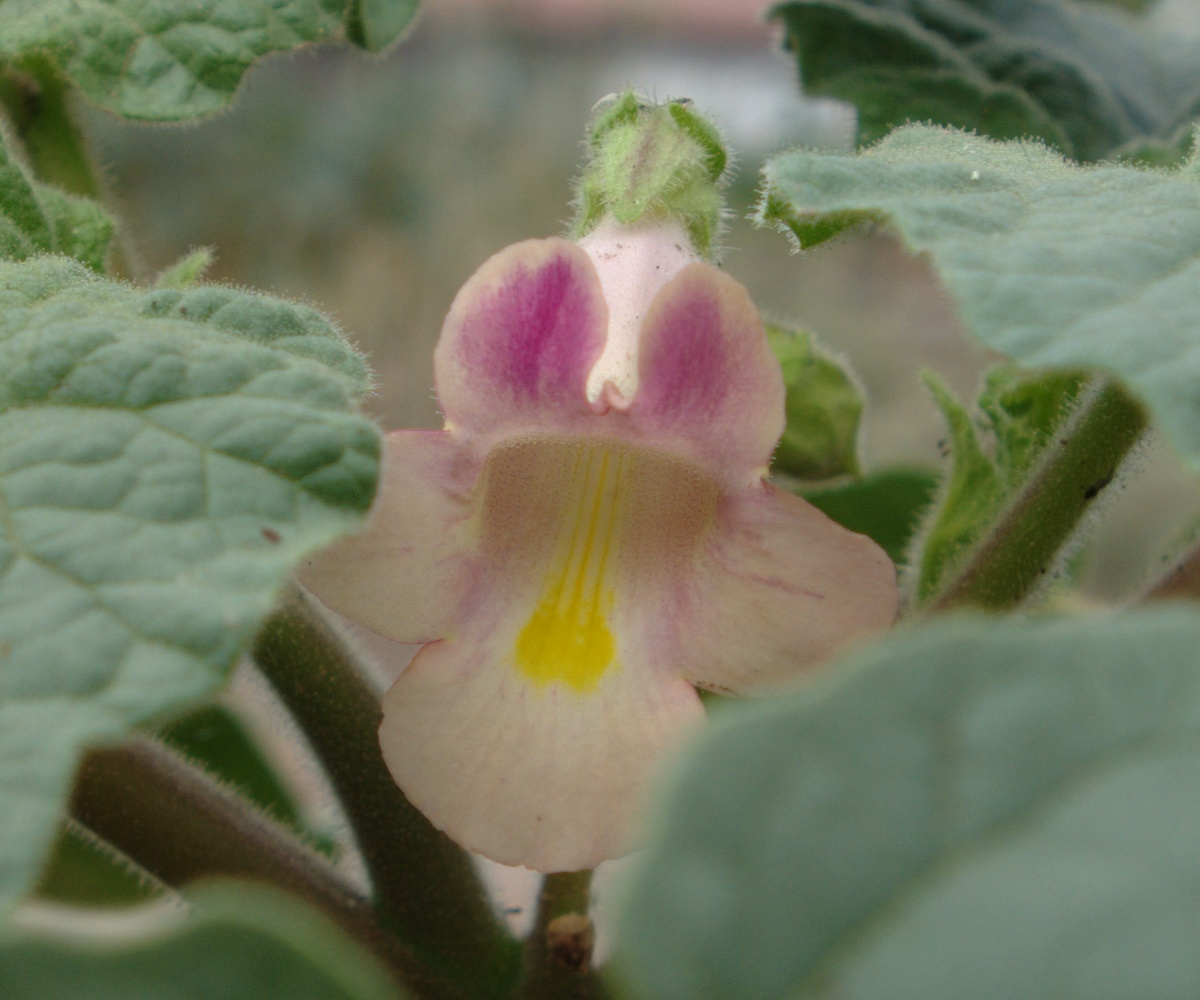
Flower of P. parviflora ssp. parviflora var. hohokamiana

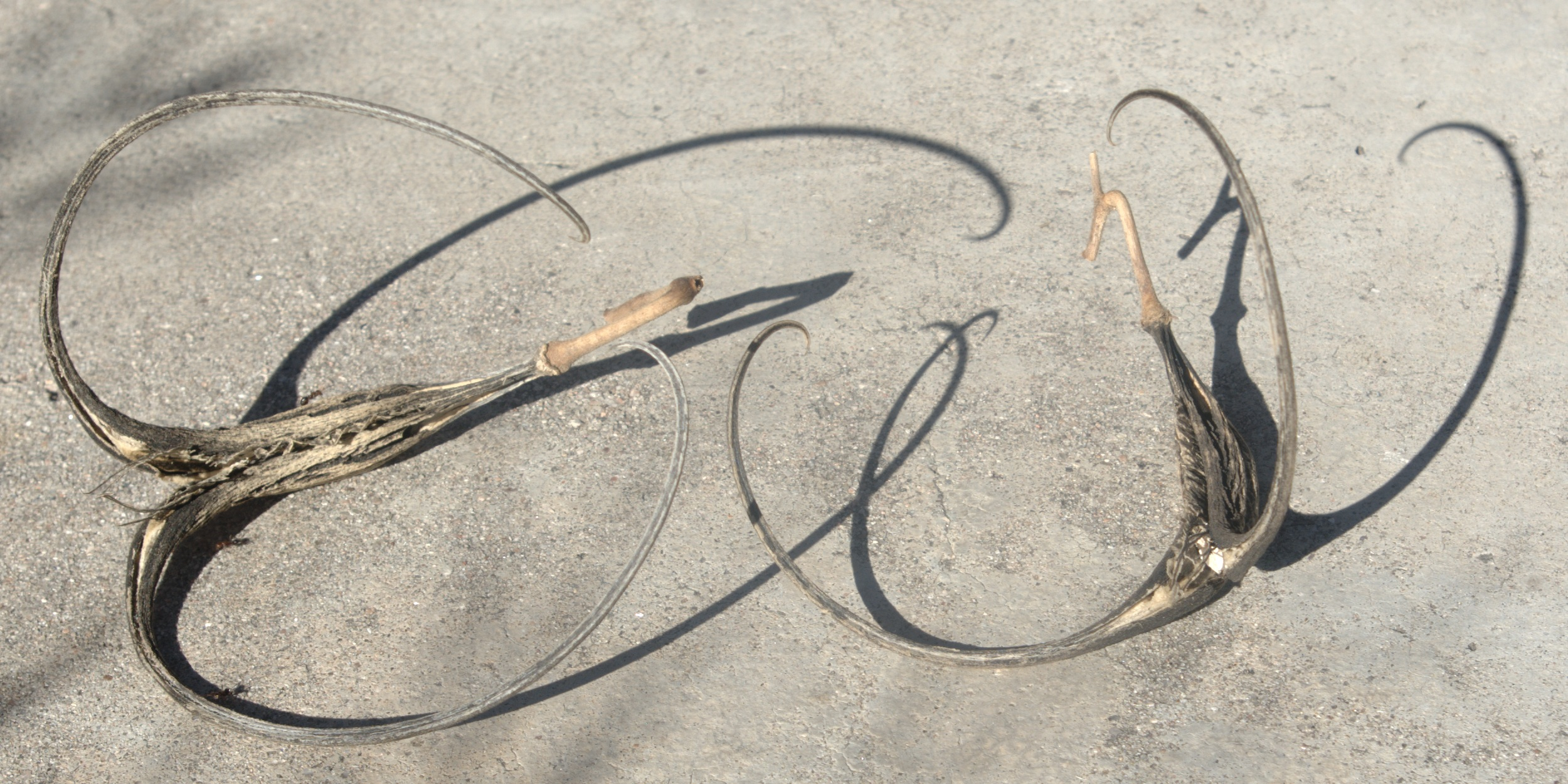
"Devil's claw" fruits of P. parviflora var. hohokamiana

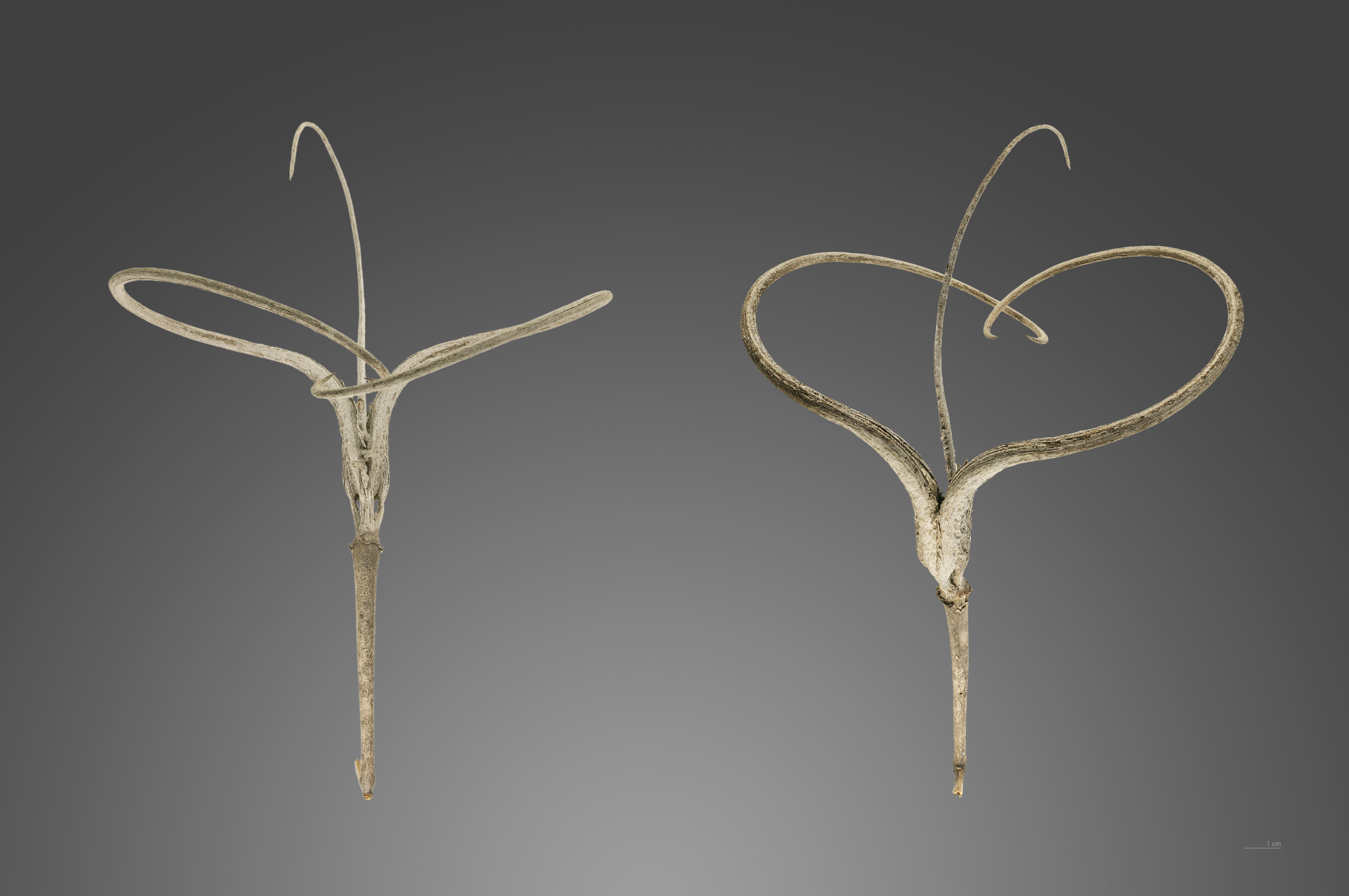
"Devil's claw" capsule of Proboscidea althaeifolia

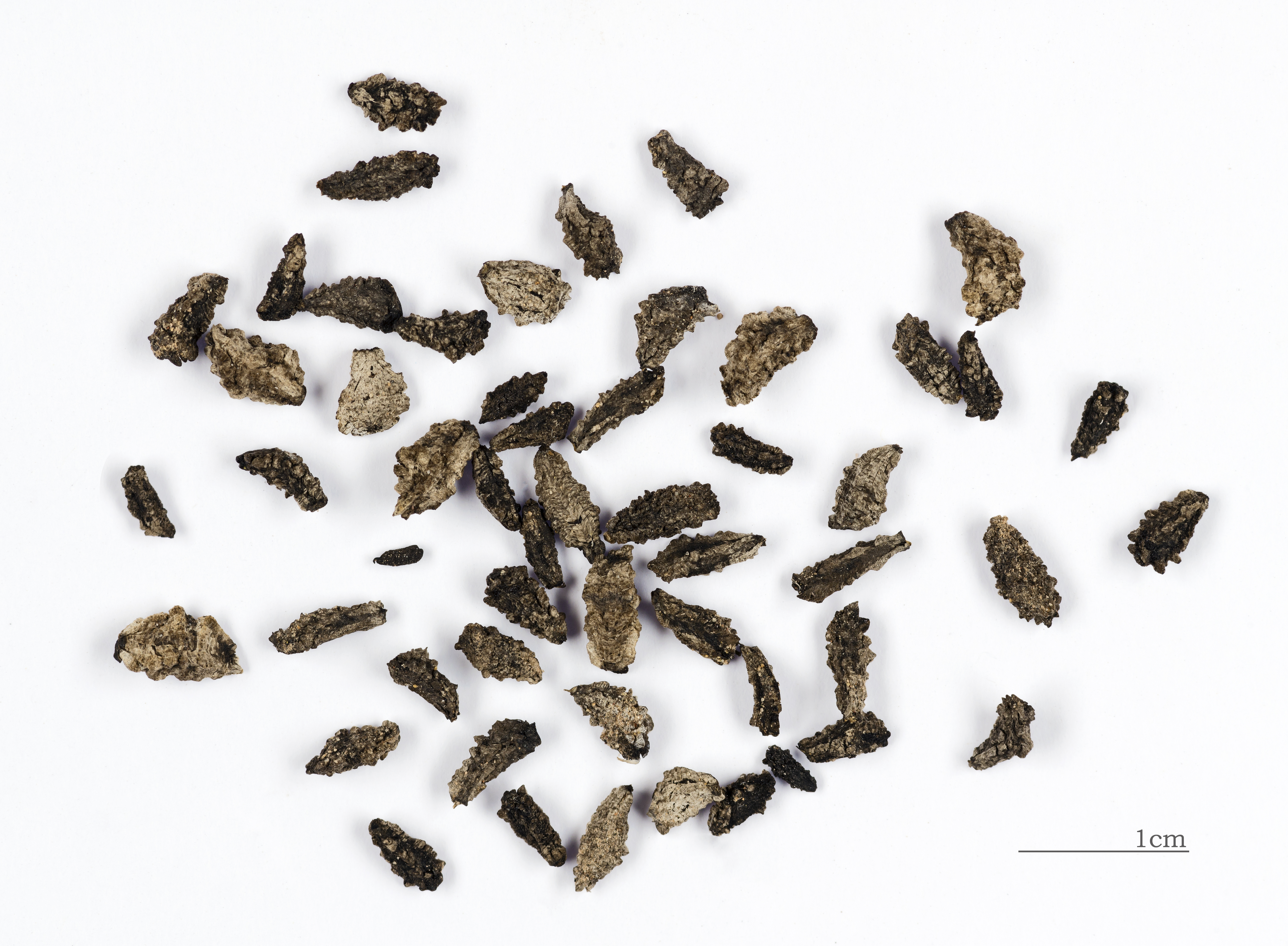
"Devil's claw" seeds of Proboscidea althaeifolia

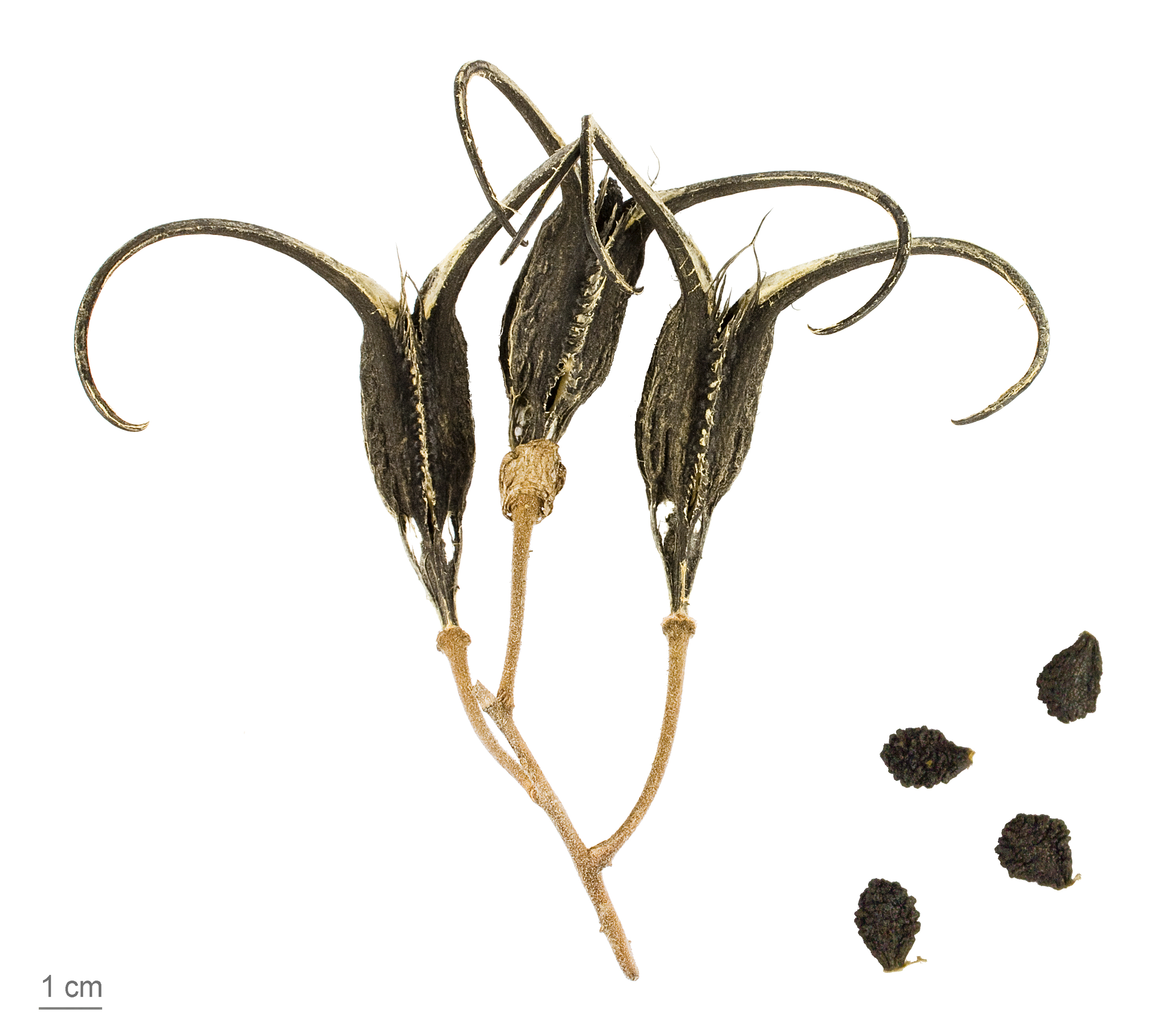
Proboscidea parviflora - capsule and seeds - MHNT

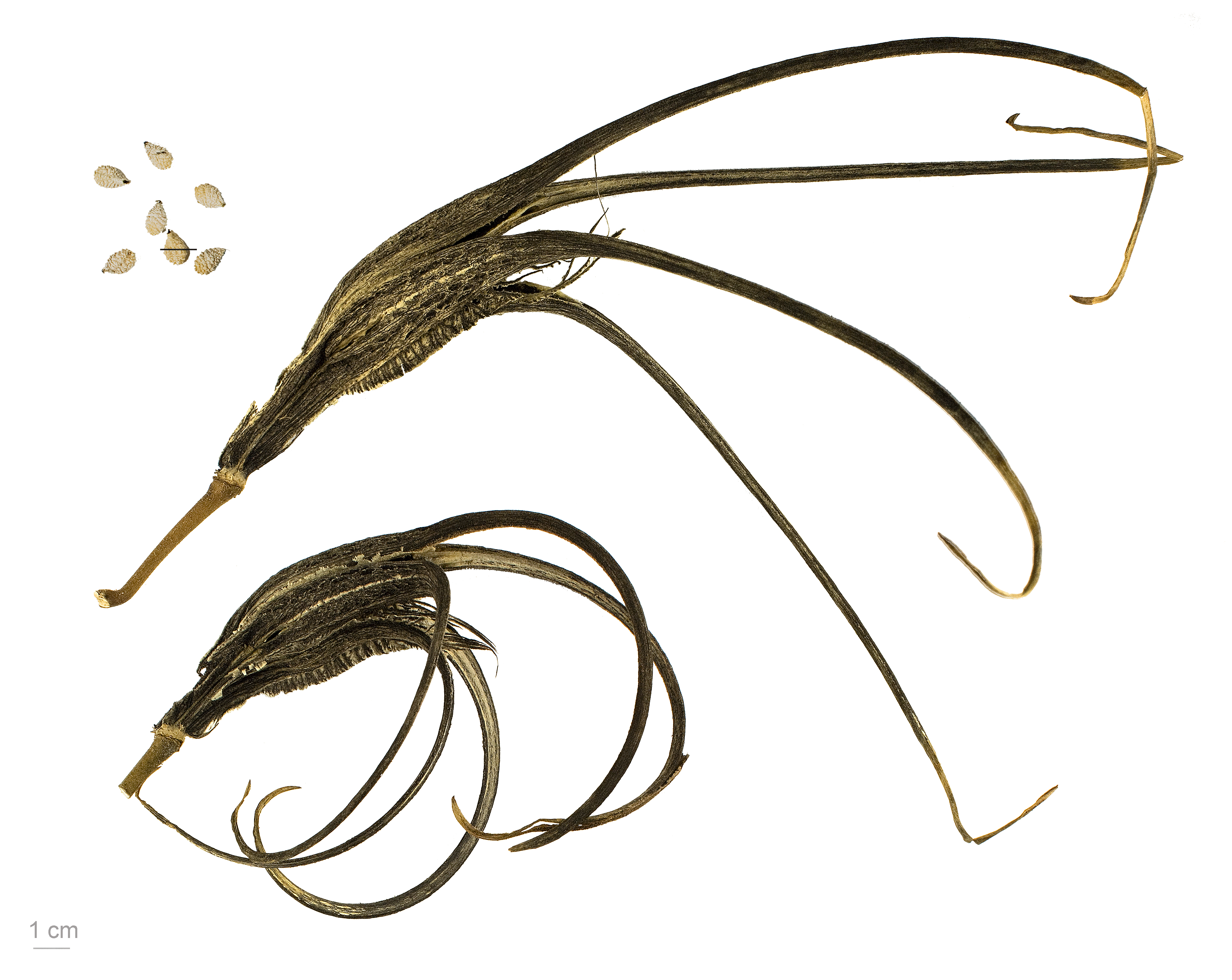
Proboscidea parviflora var. hohokamiana - capsule and seeds - MHNT
