= Holoregmia =

Scientific classification
- Kingdom: Plantae
- Clade: Tracheophytes
- Clade: Angiosperms
- Clade: Eudicots
- Clade: Asterids
- Order: Lamiales
- Family: Martyniaceae
- Genus: Holoregmia; Nees
- Species: H. viscida

Binomial name
- Holoregmia viscida Nees

Genus of plants

Holoregmia is a monotypic genus of flowering plants belonging to the family Martyniaceae. The only species is Holoregmia viscida.

Its native range is Northeastern Brazil.
