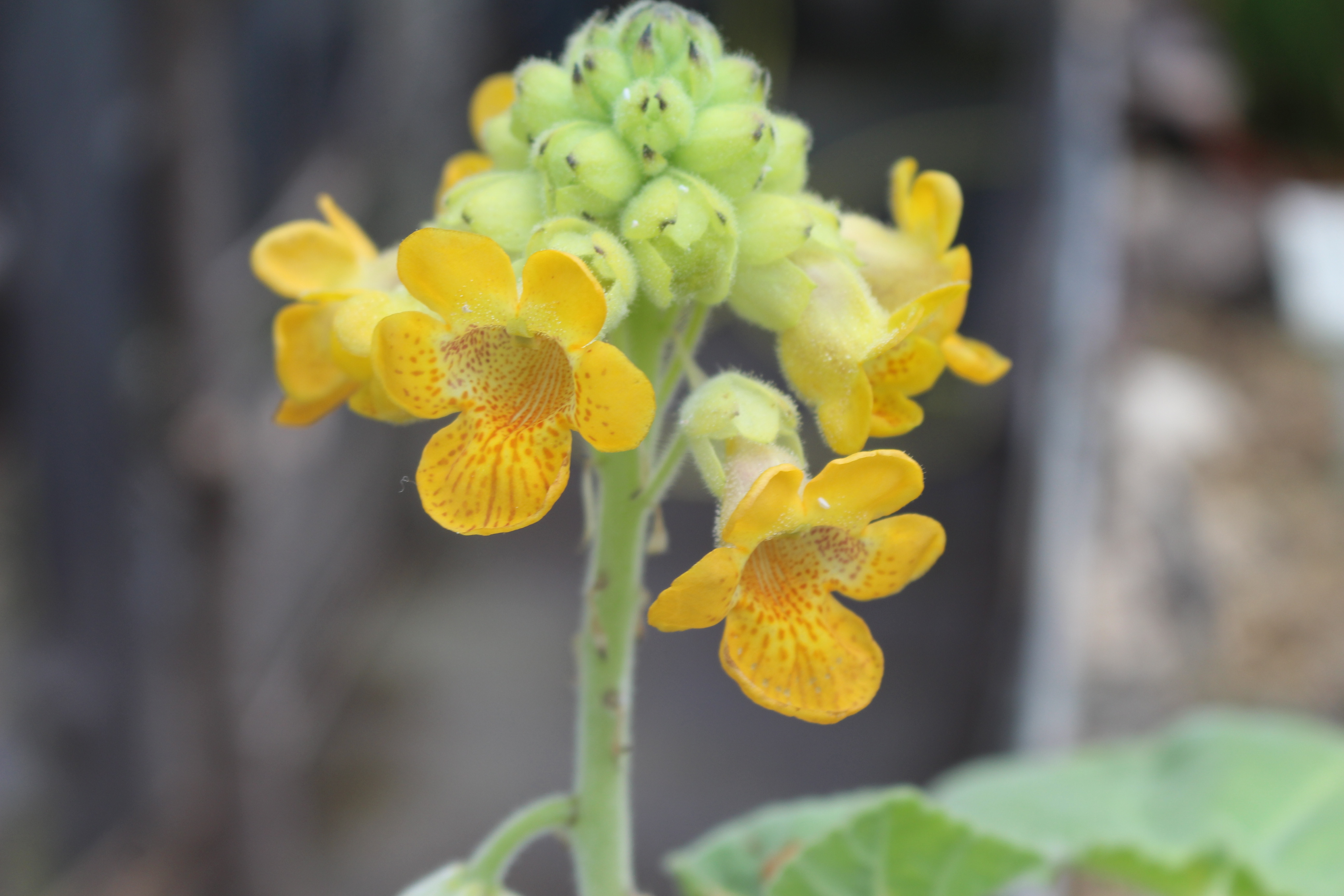
- Flowers

Scientific classification
- Kingdom: Plantae
- Clade: Tracheophytes
- Clade: Angiosperms
- Clade: Eudicots
- Clade: Asterids
- Order: Lamiales
- Family: Martyniaceae
- Genus: Ibicella
- Species: I. lutea

Binomial name
- Ibicella lutea (Lindl.) Van Eselt.
- Ibicella lutea distribution

Synonyms
- Martynia lutea; Proboscidea lutea; Ibicella nelsoniana (Barb. Rodr.) Van Eselt.

= Ibicella lutea =

Species of carnivorous plant

Botanical drawing of Ibicella lutea.

Ibicella lutea (/aɪbɪˈsɛlə ˈljuːtiə/; syn. Martynia lutea, Proboscidea lutea) is a species of flowering plant known by the common name yellow unicorn-plant. It grows in dry conditions, such as those in desert regions. It is native to South America, but has become established as a non-native species in various semi-arid regions around the world, including Southern Africa and the Central Valley of California. The plant is aromatic, with an unpleasant scent. It produces short, glandular hairs over most of its aerial surfaces and is coated in sticky resin. Insects often become stuck in the slimy exudate and die, but the plant does not have digestive enzymes and does not absorb nutrients from the insects. The plant can be considered protocarnivorous, but it is not carnivorous.

== Gallery ==
Mature hook-shaped fruit on a Ibicella lutea plant.

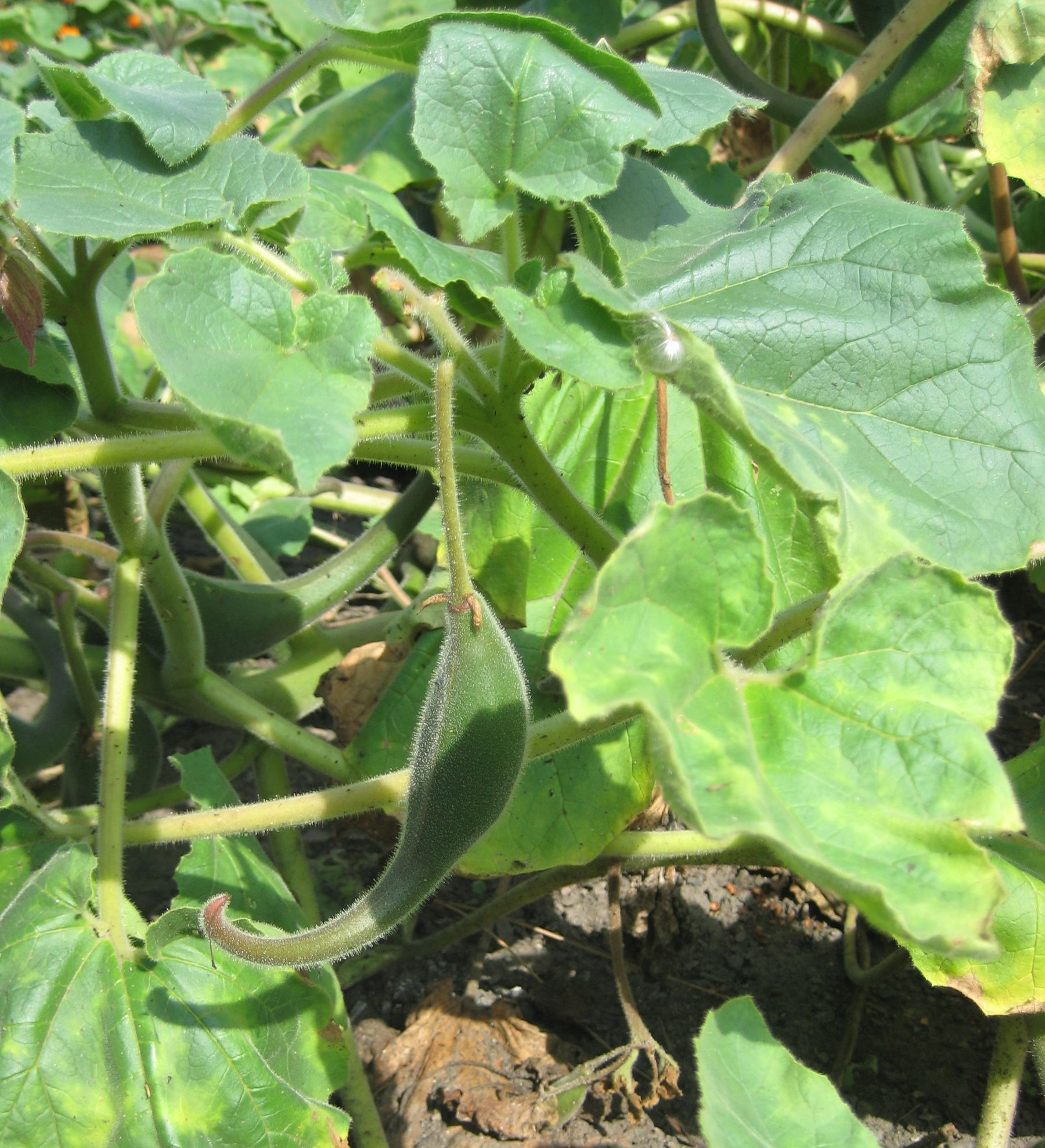
Ibicella lutea plant with green immature fruit.
