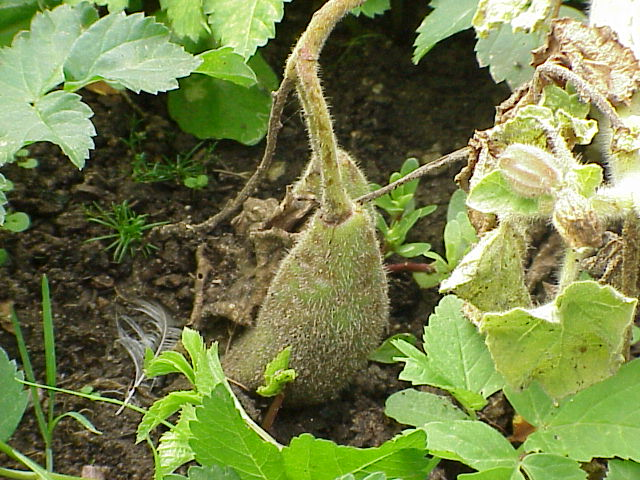
- Proboscidea louisianica

Scientific classification
- Kingdom: Plantae
- Clade: Tracheophytes
- Clade: Angiosperms
- Clade: Eudicots
- Clade: Asterids
- Order: Lamiales
- Family: Martyniaceae; Horaninow

Genera
- See text

= Martyniaceae =

Family of flowering plants

Martyniaceae is a family of flowering plants in the Lamiales order that are restricted to the Americas. The family was included in Pedaliaceae in the Cronquist system (under order Scrophulariales) but is recognized as a separate family by the Angiosperm Phylogeny Group on the basis of phylogenetic studies that show that the two families are not closely related. Both families are characterized by having mucilaginous hairs — which give the stems and leaves a slimy or clammy feel — and fruits with hooks or horns. Some members of the genus Proboscidea are known as "unicorn plant" or "devil's claw" because of their horned seed capsules.

== General ==
- Craniolaria
- Holoregmia
- Ibicella
- Martynia
- Proboscidea
