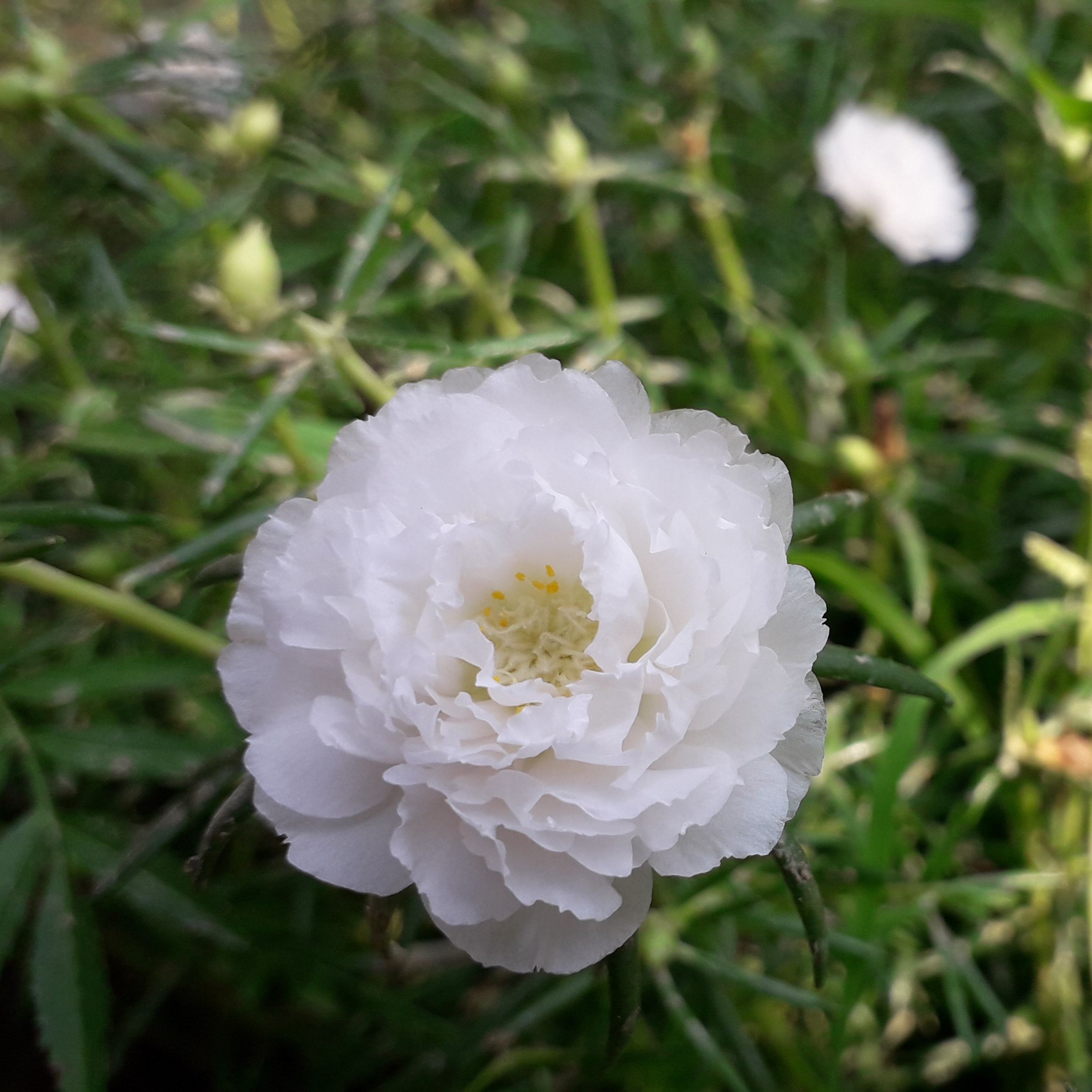

Scientific classification
- Kingdom: Plantae
- Clade: Tracheophytes
- Clade: Angiosperms
- Clade: Eudicots
- Order: Caryophyllales
- Family: Portulacaceae
- Genus: Portulaca
- Species: P. grandiflora

Binomial name
- Portulaca grandiflora Hook.

Synonyms
- Portulaca hilaireana G. Don; Portulaca immersostellulata Poelln.; Portulaca mendocinensis Gillies ex Hook.; Portulaca multistaminata Poelln.

= Portulaca grandiflora =

Rose-like flowering plant

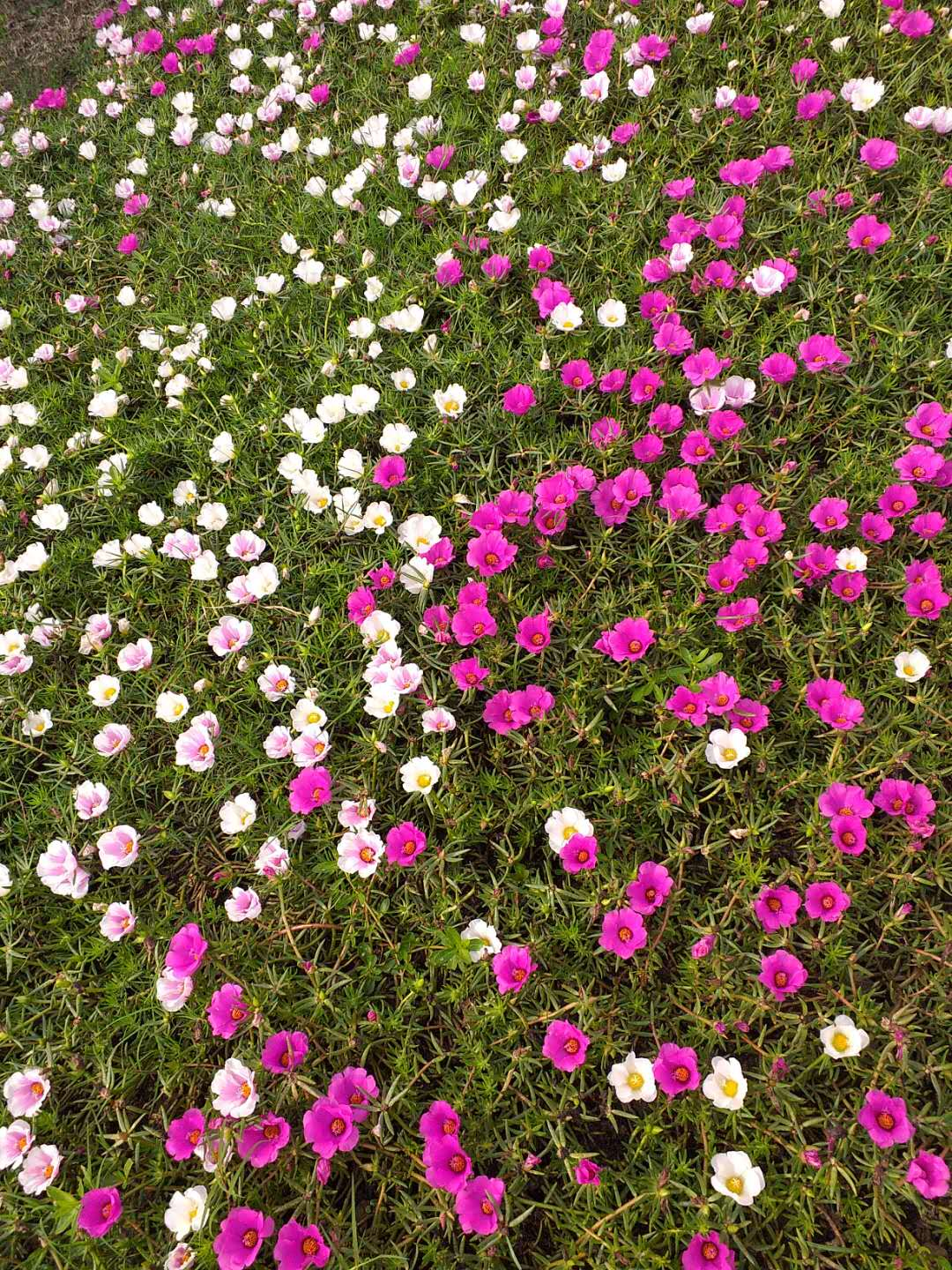
Portulaca Grandiflora

Portulaca grandiflora is a succulent flowering plant in the purslane family Portulacaceae, native to southern Brazil, Argentina, and Uruguay and often cultivated in gardens. It has many common names, including rose moss, eleven o'clock, Mexican rose, moss rose, sun rose, rose Jepun, table rose, rock rose, and moss-rose purslane. Despite these names and the superficial resemblance of some cultivars' flowers to roses, it is not a true rose, nor even a part of the rose family or rosid group; rather, it is much more closely related to carnations and cacti.

It is also seen in South Asia and widely spread in most of the cities with old 18th- and 19th-century architecture in the Balkans.

== Description ==
It is a small, but fast-growing annual plant growing to 30 cm tall, though usually less. However, if it is cultivated properly, it can easily reach this height. The leaves are thick and fleshy, up to 2.5 cm long, arranged alternately or in small clusters. The flowers are 2.5–3 cm diameter with five petals, variably red, orange, pink, white, and yellow. Their upright, or ascending, long shoots branch usually near the base. The spreading 20-to-25-millimeters-long and 2-to-3-millimeters-wide leaves are almost or completely stalk-shaped, and taper towards the tip.

The axillary leaves have few to numerous whitish, woolly hairs which are usually shorter than the sheets. The compressed inflorescences are surrounded by eight to ten leaves. The large flowers reach a diameter of up to 4 centimetres. The five bright magenta-coloured petals are obovate and 15 to 26 millimeters long. Around the ovary with four to nine whitish scars are about 50 stamens. Capsules and seeds are not visible.

P. grandiflora is one of the few plants that is a C_{4}/CAM intermediate, utilizing both C_{4} carbon fixation and Crassulacean acid metabolism pathways in different cells for photosynthesis.

== Cultivation and uses ==
Numerous cultivars have been selected for double flowers with additional petals, and for variation in flower colour, plain or variegated. It is widely grown in temperate climates as an ornamental plant for annual bedding or as a container plant. It requires ample sunlight and well-drained soils. It requires almost no attention and spreads itself very easily. In places with old architecture it can grow between the stones of the road or sidewalk. Seeds are often sold as mixtures, such as Double Flowering Mixture (see illustrations). It grows on sandy soils. In countries with a frost-free climate, it is wild.

Unlike P. oleracea and P. umbraticola, it is not edible because of its bitter taste. There are hybrids of P. grandiflora with P. oleracea, umbraticola and villosa.

It is visited by honeybees for its pollen and nectar.

== Gallery ==
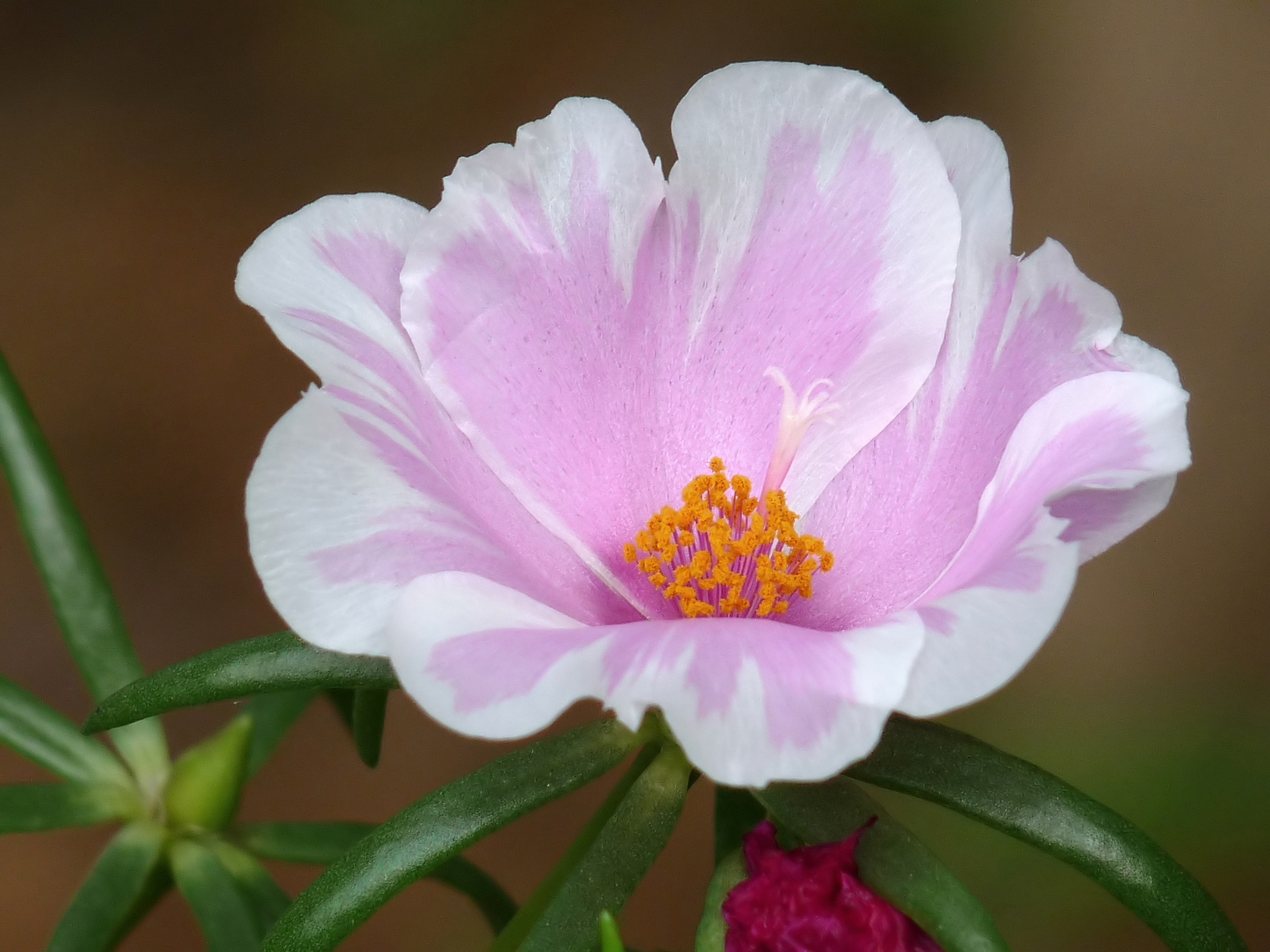
Bicoloured

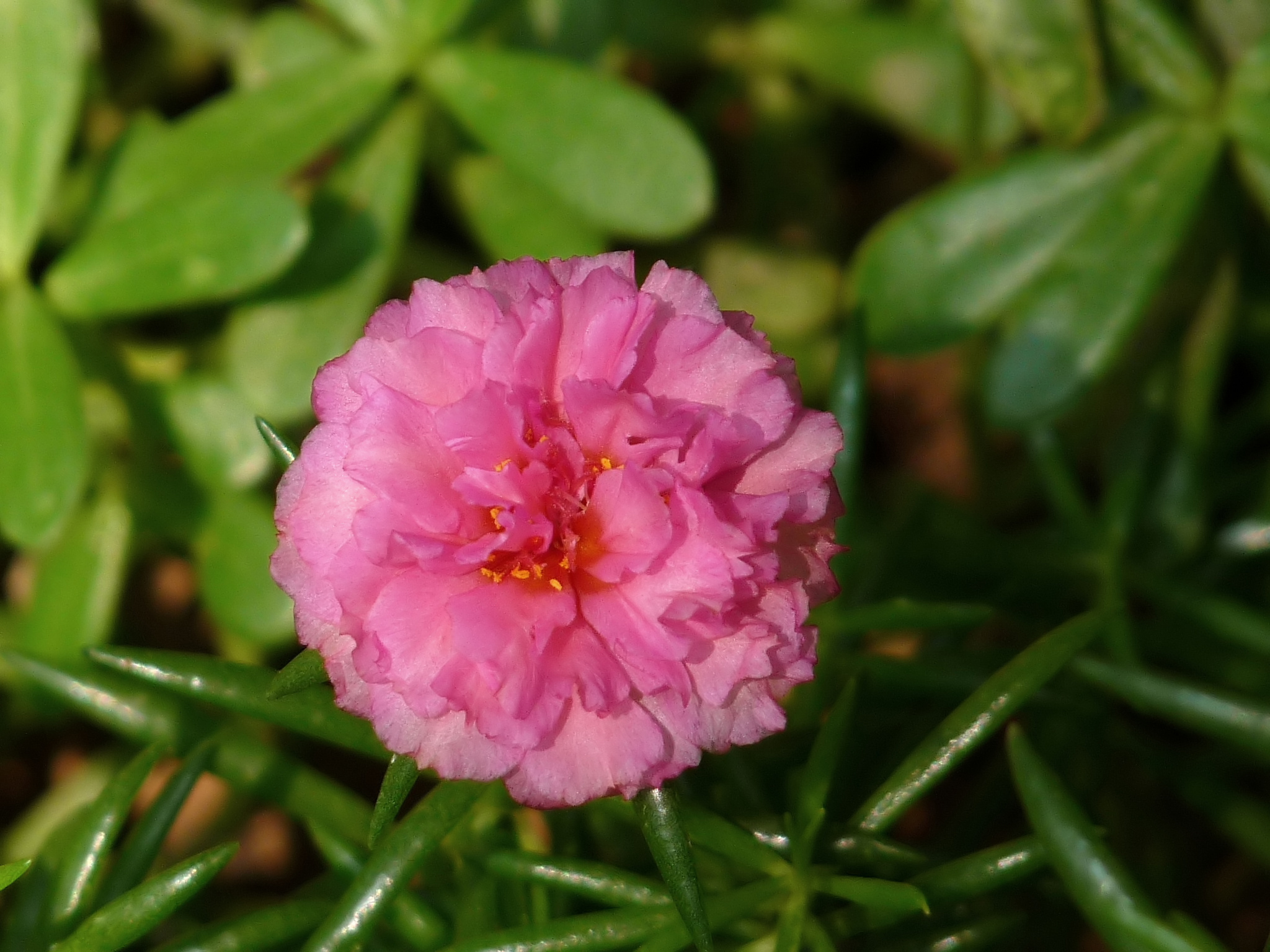
In India

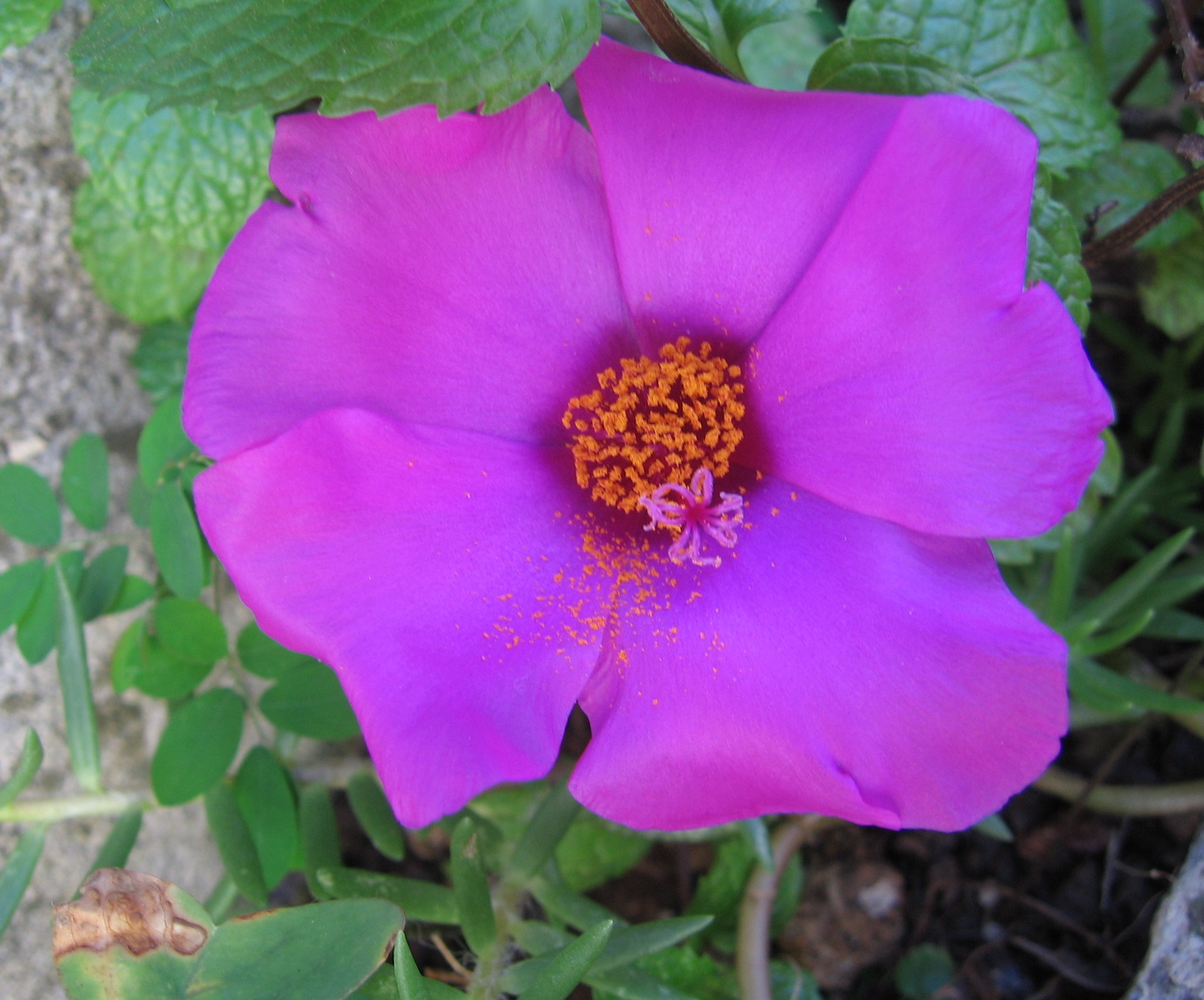
Traditional Brazilian flower

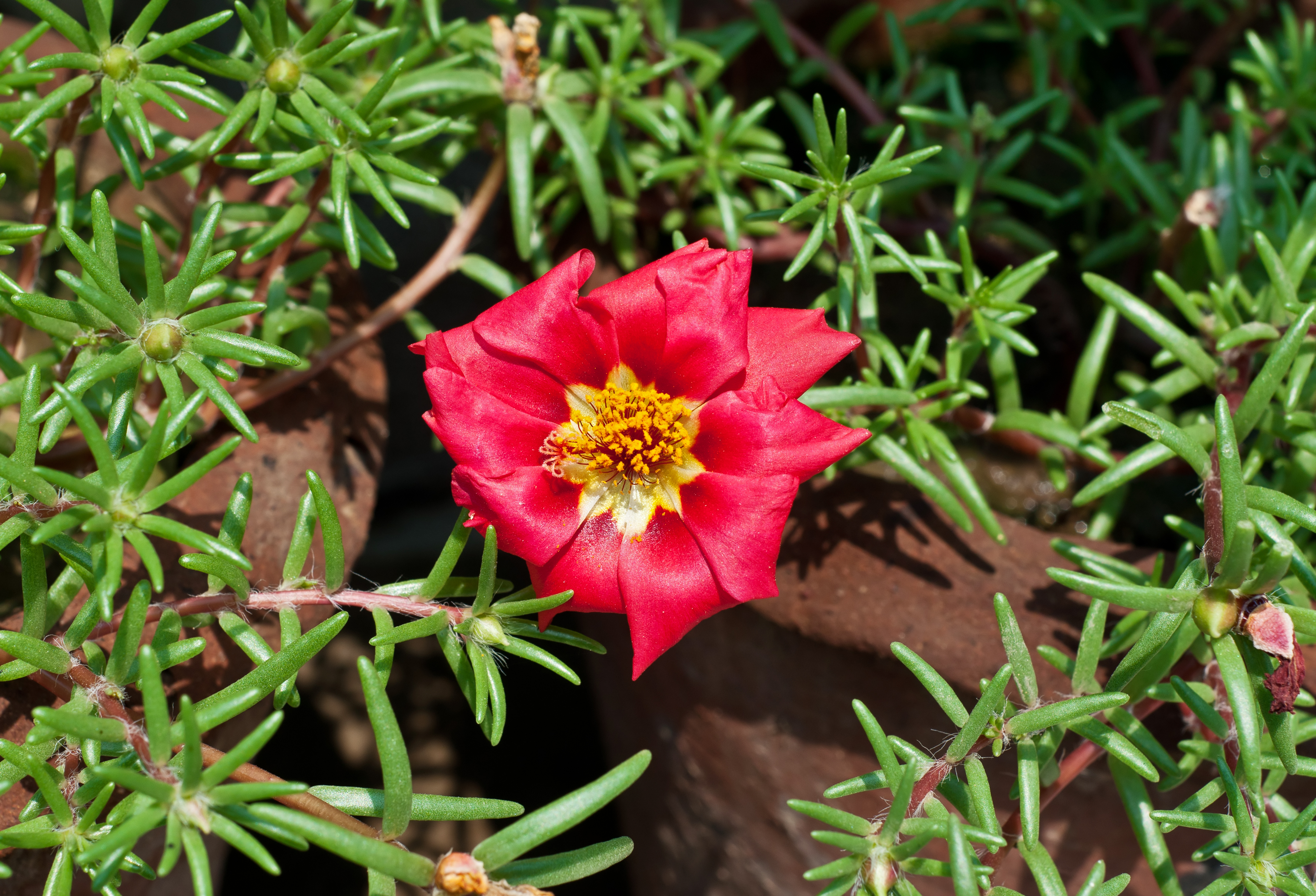
Single leaves

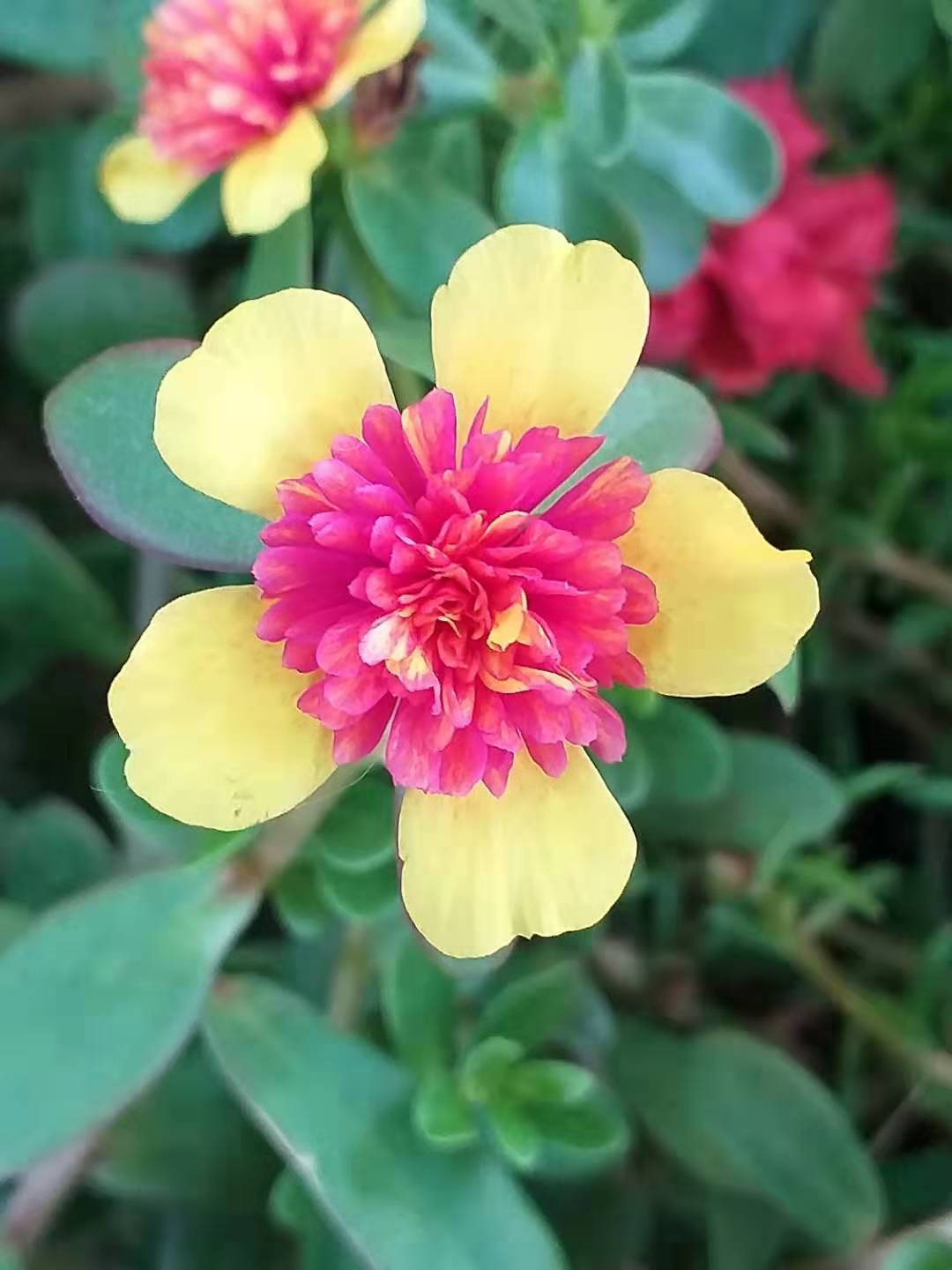
Cultivar with double flowers
