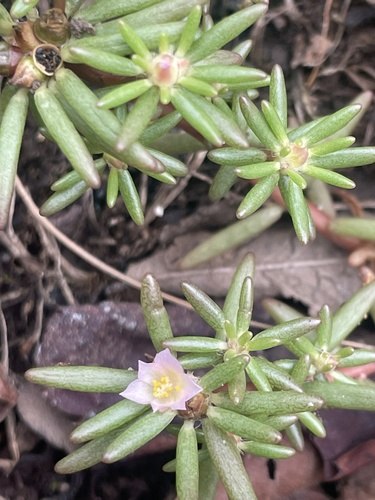
- Flowering P. smallii found in North Carolina

Scientific classification
- Kingdom: Plantae
- Clade: Tracheophytes
- Clade: Angiosperms
- Clade: Eudicots
- Order: Caryophyllales
- Family: Portulacaceae
- Genus: Portulaca
- Species: P. smallii

Binomial name
- Portulaca smallii P.Wilson

= Portulaca smallii =

Species of plant

Portulaca smallii, or Small's purslane, is an annual flowering plant found in the southeast of the United States. It belongs to the Portulacaceae family.

== Description ==
Portulaca smallii flowers are cosexual and the plant is a dicot with 4-5 petals and 8-12 stamens per flower. The stigmas are four-lobed and the fruits are sub-globose capsules. The flowers range from white to medium pink, but color does not vary within a plant. The leaves demonstrate an alternating pattern. There are axillary trichomes by the leaves and flowers. The leaves are fleshy and elongate and the margins are entire. The plant is 2-15 cm tall, with the leaves being 4-15mm long, 0.5-3 mm wide, and linear-lanceolate in shape. The leaf apex is subobtuse to subacute in shape. Seeds are gray or black, and stellate-tuberculate in shape. They can be as large as .85mm.

== Taxonomy ==
Portulaca smallii belongs to the Portulacaceae family, and likely originated from P. pilosa. The two species are very similar. P. smallii can be distinguished by its lower stamen count, lower hair amount, and larger seed size.

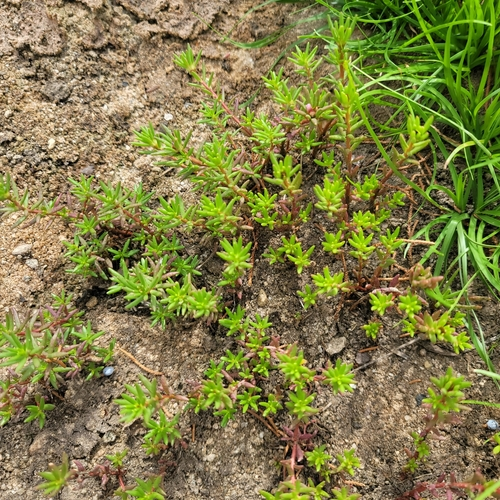
Portulaca smallii found in Columbus, Georgia

== Distribution and habitat ==
Portulaca smallii can be found in the southeastern piedmont, in Virginia, North Carolina, South Carolina, and Georgia, usually at an elevation of 200-300m. It grows in sandy soil on granite rocks, in the ecotone between dense vegetation and rock where the soil is shallow and few other plants can be found. It grows best when in full sun conditions. Erosion, high temperatures, droughts, and wind limit the ability for other plants to survive in these areas. This results in low competition for P. smallii.

There is evidence of P. smallii thriving in disturbed environments. By Dundas Granite Flatrock, it was found growing not on the granite rock, but instead in an old logging bed, a grazed woodland, and a mowed golf green. However, it does not spread rapidly and does not have an adaptation for large scale seed dispersal.

== Phenology and physiology ==
Portulaca smallii flowers from late spring to early fall. It germinates in spring or summer based on light and soil moisture conditions. If temperatures remain warm, seeds can lay dormant and maintain their ability to germinate through winter. Flowers only open once for one day. If conditions are not adequately sunny, the flower may not fully open. In these cases, self-fertilization often occurs. P. smallii cannot survive temperatures below freezing, but it can survive high temperatures of up to 55 degrees Celsius by folding its leaves up against the stem.

Portulaca smallii uses the C4 carbon fixation pathway. This pathway allows plants to concentrate CO_{2} to feed into RuBisCo, thus limiting RuBisCo oxygen fixation which creates a toxic product resulting in photorespiration being required to remove said product.

== Species interactions ==
Portulaca smallii has been observed experiencing predation from larval leaf beetles, red spider mites, and spring-tails. Hymenoptera species pollinate P. smallii. When grown with ryegrass, P. smallii experienced greater initial growth, but lesser total growth. These plants grew high with fewer branches and leaves than plants grown in the absence of ryegrass. The control P. smallii also ended up reaching a greater height than the plants grown with ryegrass.

== Conservation ==
As of November 2025, NatureServe listed Portulaca smallii as Vulnerable (G3). The status was last reviewed on 22 May 2006. In individual states, it is listed as Critically Imperiled (S1), in Virginia; Imperiled (S2) in North Carolina, Critically Imperiled (S1) in South Carolina; and Vulnerable (S3) in Georgia.
