= Purslane =

Purslane is a common name for several mostly unrelated plants with edible leaves and may refer to:

- Portulacaceae, a family of succulent flowering plants, and especially:
  - Portulaca oleracea, a species of Portulaca eaten as a leaf vegetable, known as summer purslane
  - Portulaca grandiflora, moss rose, or moss-rose purslane
- Claytonia perfoliata, miner's lettuce or winter purslane
- Claytonia sibirica, pink purslane
- Halimione portulacoides, sea purslane
- Ludwigia palustris, Hampshire purslane
- Lythrum portula, water purslane
- Sesuvium portulacastrum, shoreline purslane
- Honckenya peploides, also called sea purslane
- Portulacaria afra, purslane tree
