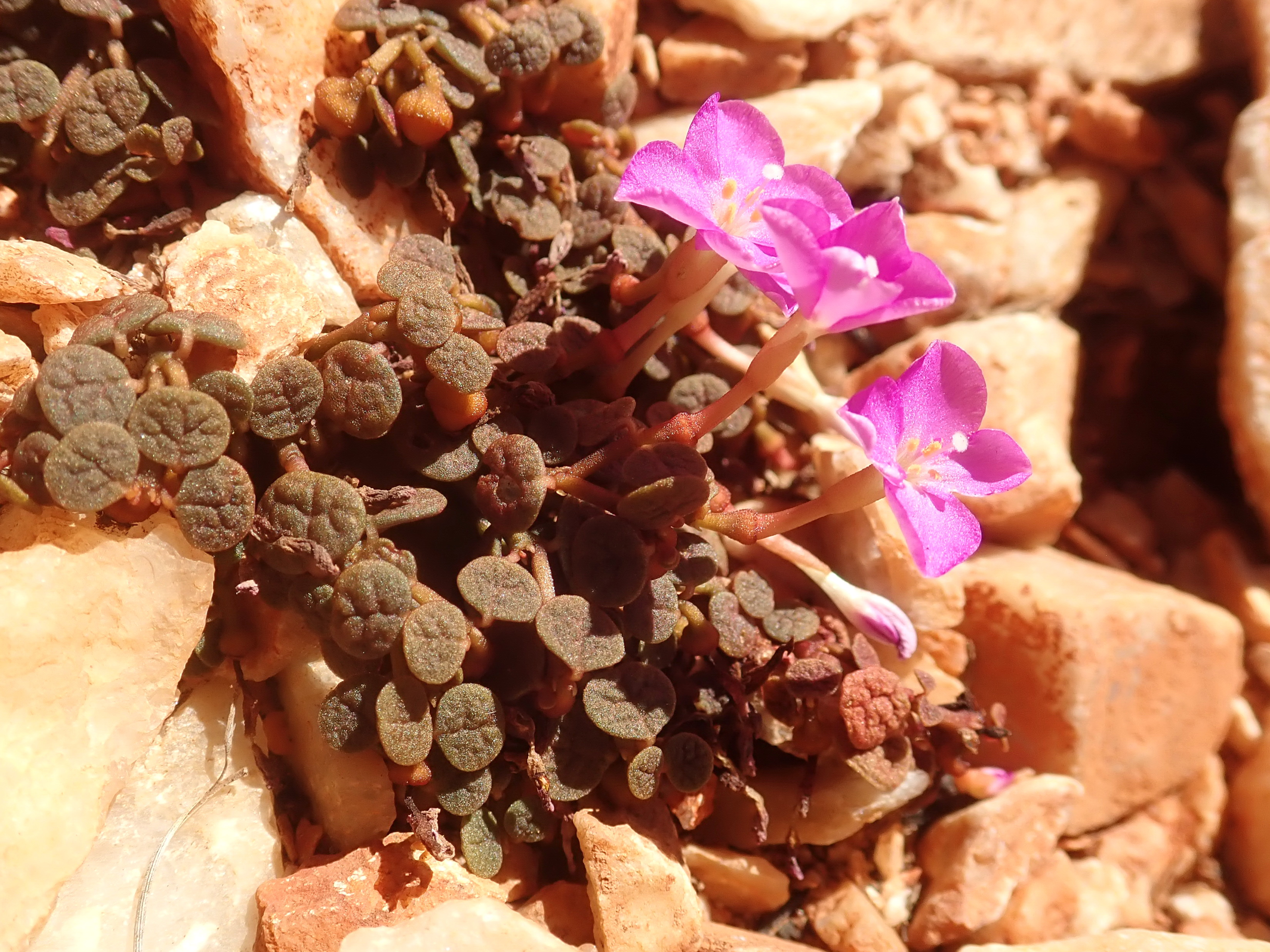
- near summit of Brinkley Bluff in West MacDonnell National Park

Conservation status
- Near Threatened (TPWCA)

Scientific classification
- Kingdom: Plantae
- Clade: Tracheophytes
- Clade: Angiosperms
- Clade: Eudicots
- Order: Caryophyllales
- Family: Portulacaceae
- Genus: Portulaca
- Species: P. filsonii

Binomial name
- Portulaca filsonii J.H.Willis

Synonyms
- Sedopsis filsonii (J.H.Willis) J.H.Willis

= Portulaca filsonii =

Species of plant

Portulaca filsonii (common names - Sedopsis, Pink Rock-wort) is a plant in the Portulacaceae family, endemic to central Australia in the Northern Territory.

It was first described by James Hamlyn Willis in 1975 from a specimen collected in Kings Canyon. The holotype, MEL 501441 and isotype, MEL 501455, were both collected by Willis in 1966. The name accepted by the Council of Heads of Australasian Herbaria is the later name of Sedopsis filsonii, created as a new combination by Willis in 1977.

The species epithet, filsonii, honours Rex Bertram Filson.

Portulaca filsonii is listed as "Near Threatened" under the TPWCA Act.

== Description ==
Portulaca filsonii is a prostrate, succulent perennial plant. It has a swollen root, and its leaves are opposite. The flowers have a tubular corolla with four pink spreading lobes. There are two partially fused sepals.
