= Portulaca kuriensis =

Conservation status
- Vulnerable (IUCN 3.1)

Scientific classification
- Kingdom: Plantae
- Clade: Tracheophytes
- Clade: Angiosperms
- Clade: Eudicots
- Order: Caryophyllales
- Family: Portulacaceae
- Genus: Portulaca
- Species: P. kuriensis

Binomial name
- Portulaca kuriensis A.G.Mill.

Species of flowering plant

Portulaca kuriensis is a species of flowering plant in the purslane family, Portulacaceae, that is endemic to Socotra island in Yemen. Its natural habitats are subtropical or tropical dry shrubland and rocky areas.
