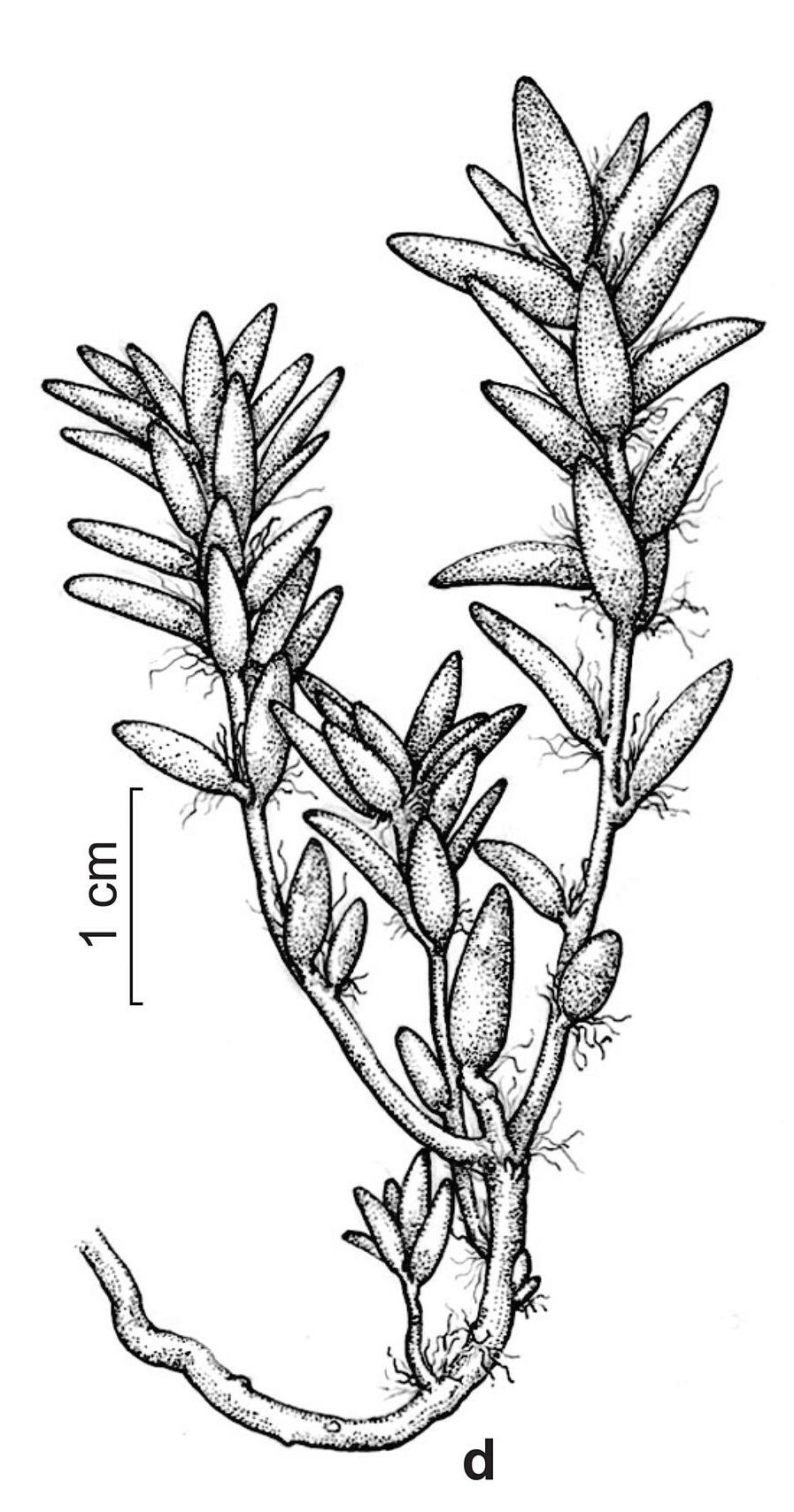

Scientific classification
- Kingdom: Plantae
- Clade: Tracheophytes
- Clade: Angiosperms
- Clade: Eudicots
- Order: Caryophyllales
- Family: Portulacaceae
- Genus: Portulaca
- Species: P. sedifolia

Binomial name
- Portulaca sedifolia N.E.Br.

= Portulaca sedifolia =

Species of flowering plant

Portulaca sedifolia is a species of flowering plant in the purslane family, Portulacaceae. It is native to northern South America, including Venezuela, the Venezuelan Antilles, Guyana, Suriname, and French Guiana.
