= Portulaca rubricaulis =

- Portulaca rubricaulis flower and "splash cup"

Scientific classification
- Kingdom: Plantae
- Clade: Tracheophytes
- Clade: Angiosperms
- Clade: Eudicots
- Order: Caryophyllales
- Family: Portulacaceae
- Genus: Portulaca
- Species: P. rubricaulis

Binomial name
- Portulaca rubricaulis Kunth

Synonyms
- Portulaca brevioperculata Poelln.; Portulaca phaeosperma Urb.

Species of succulent plant

Stamens surrounding 7 stigmas

Leafy stems and flower

Long trichomes at leaf bases and subopposite leaves

Wilted, drought-stressed plant with splash cups and flower

Portulaca rubricaulis, the redstem purslane, is a species of succulent plant native mostly to tropical America. It belongs to the family Portulacaceae.

== Description ==
Among the approximately 154 accepted species of the genus Portulaca, Redstem purslane can be distinguished by the following key features:

- It is a perennial or annual plant with fleshy roots and stems up to 35 cm (14 in) long standing erect or leaning somewhat. Conspicuous tufts of hairlike trichomes appear where leaves attach to the stems.
- Fleshy, narrow leaves which grow more or less opposite (subopposite) one another on the stems are round to half-round in cross-section, and are up to 15 mm (9/16 in) long and 5 mm (3/16 in) wide, with sharply pointed tips.
- Flowers are up to 15 mm (9/16 in) in diameter, with calyces consisting of 2 unfused sepals, and 5 yellow petals, which are not fused with one another at their bases; petal tips are rounded. From 12 to 30 stamens cluster around the inferior ovary with its 5-7 stigmas.
- Capsular fruits are nearly spherical and up to 5.5 mm (3/16 in) in diameter. As with all Portulaca species, the capsule, instead of splitting lengthwise like most capsular fruits, splits across its middle so that the top comes off, forming a bowl-like structure holding the seeds. Sometimes these bowls are called "pixie cups," or "splash cups." The tiny, numerous seeds are brownish red to dark brown or blackish, and flattened.

== The splash cups ==
Redstem purslane's splash cups deserve special mention because this species has some good ones. Below the splash cups, leaves, looking like involucral bracts, radiate outward like petals, appearing to form a "false flower" with the cup of seeds forming an "eye." When heavy raindrops splash into the cups, the tiny seeds can be splashed out for a meter (3.3 ft) or more. Splash cups, then, are seed dispersal structures. Splash cups have evolved in several plant families and even among the fungi, so they clearly serve their purpose, and afford a striking example of parallel evolution.

== Distribution ==
In the US, Portulaca rubricaulis occurs only in southwestern Florida. In Mexico it is limited to the southern states of Campeche, Chiapas, Quintana Roo and Yucatán. It is broadly distributed throughout the islands of the Caribbean, is missing in Central America, but in northern South America it is native to Venezuela, Colombia and Ecuador.

== Habitat ==
In Florida in the US, Portulaca rubricaulis inhabits coastal beaches and shell mounds. In Mexico's tropical, lowland Yucatan Peninsula with its limestone bedrock, the species frequents disturbed and rocky soils. In the Bahamas, it grows on exposed flat rock and sand in coastal areas and dunes.

== Taxonomy ==
Portulaca rubricaulis is one of many taxa first scientifically collected by Aimé Bonpland and Alexander von Humboldt on their exploratory American Expedition of 1799-1804, plant collections from which were made available for taxonomic treatment to the German botanist Carl Sigismund Kunth. In 1823, when Kunth formally described and named the species he noted that his type specimen had red stems and that the species grew on the shores of the Sinus cariacensis, or Gulf of Cariaco which is off the north central coast of Venezuela; it was flowering in September.

Older literature treated Portulaca rubricaulis as Portulaca phaeosperma, but the latter name now is regarded as a synonym of the former.

=== Phylogenetics ===
Molecular phylogenetic analysis suggests that the genus Portulaca is divided into two major clades: The OL clade comprising opposite-leaved species distributed in Africa, Asia and Australia, and the AL clade with alternate to somewhat opposite (subopposite) leaves, based in the New World. The subopposite leaves and distribution area reflect the position of Portulaca rubricaulis in the New World AL clade. The species further has a chromosome count of 2n=16 (haploid x=8) with an estimated divergence of around 5.82 million years ago. This is about average within the genus, though the 2n count is a little unusual.

=== Etymology ===
The genus name Portulaca is based on the Latin portula, meaning "little door." This refers to the lid of the capsular fruit which comes off when the fruit is ripe, opening the capsule.

The species name rubricaulis is based on the Latin ruber, meaning "red," and the Greek caulis, meaning "stem of a plant"; thus, "red-stemmed." When Carl Sigismund Kunth named the new species in 1823, he noted that his type specimen had red stems.
