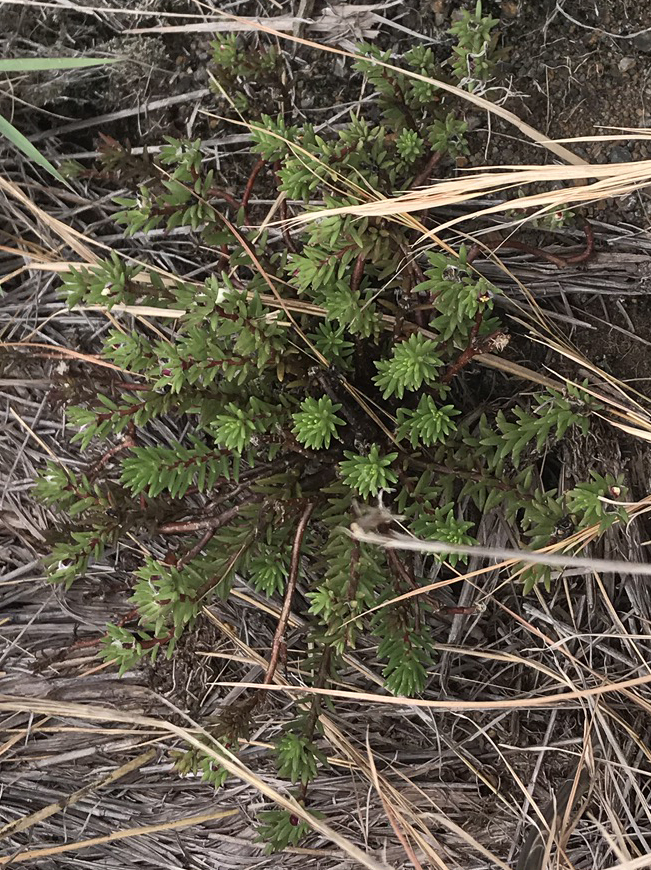

Conservation status
- Imperiled (NatureServe)

Scientific classification
- Kingdom: Plantae
- Clade: Tracheophytes
- Clade: Angiosperms
- Clade: Eudicots
- Order: Caryophyllales
- Family: Portulacaceae
- Genus: Portulaca
- Species: P. sclerocarpa

Binomial name
- Portulaca sclerocarpa A.Gray

= Portulaca sclerocarpa =

Species of flowering plant

Portulaca sclerocarpa is a rare species of flowering plant in the purslane family known by the common names 'ihi makole and po`e. It is endemic to the Hawaiian islands, where it is known only from the island of Hawaii and an islet off of Lanai. Ten occurrences exist for a total of over 1000 individuals. It is a federally listed endangered species of the United States.

This is a perennial herb with short, woody branches growing up to about 20 centimeters long. It produces white, pink, or bicolored flowers. The plant grows on cinders and lava substrates.

Threats to this rare species include introduced ungulates and plants, fires, and volcanic activity.
