= Portulaca nicaraguensis =

Scientific classification
- Kingdom: Plantae
- Clade: Embryophytes
- Clade: Tracheophytes
- Clade: Spermatophytes
- Clade: Angiosperms
- Clade: Eudicots
- Order: Caryophyllales
- Family: Portulacaceae
- Genus: Portulaca
- Species: P. nicaraguensis

Binomial name
- Portulaca nicaraguensis (Danin & H.G.Baker) Danin

Synonyms
- Portulaca oleracea subsp. nicaraguensis Danin & H.G.Baker

Species of flowering plant

Portulaca nicaraguensis, commonly known as neotropical purslane is a semisucculent plant in the family Portulacaceae. Portulaca nicaraguensis is usually considered to be native to the central and southeastern United States, Central America, the West Indies, and Macaronesia.

== Description ==
Portulaca nicaraguensis was initially described as a subspecies of Portulaca oleracea, but has since been reclassified as a distinct species due to morphological differences and a difference in ploidy (P. nicaraguensis being diploid, while P. oleracea being hexaploid). Portulaca nicaraguensis is easiest distinguished from Portulaca oleracea by its seeds which are covered in a bluish wax.
