= Portulaca monanthoides =

Conservation status
- Endangered (IUCN 3.1)

Scientific classification
- Kingdom: Plantae
- Clade: Tracheophytes
- Clade: Angiosperms
- Clade: Eudicots
- Order: Caryophyllales
- Family: Portulacaceae
- Genus: Portulaca
- Species: P. monanthoides

Binomial name
- Portulaca monanthoides Lodé (2014)

Synonyms
- Portulaca sedifolia A.G.Mill. (2004), nom. illeg.

Species of flowering plant

Portulaca monanthoides is a species of flowering plant in the family Portulacaceae. It is a succulent subshrub endemic to western Socotra island in Yemen. It occurs in small depressions on limestone slabs on an exposed ridge above Jebel Shu'ub.
