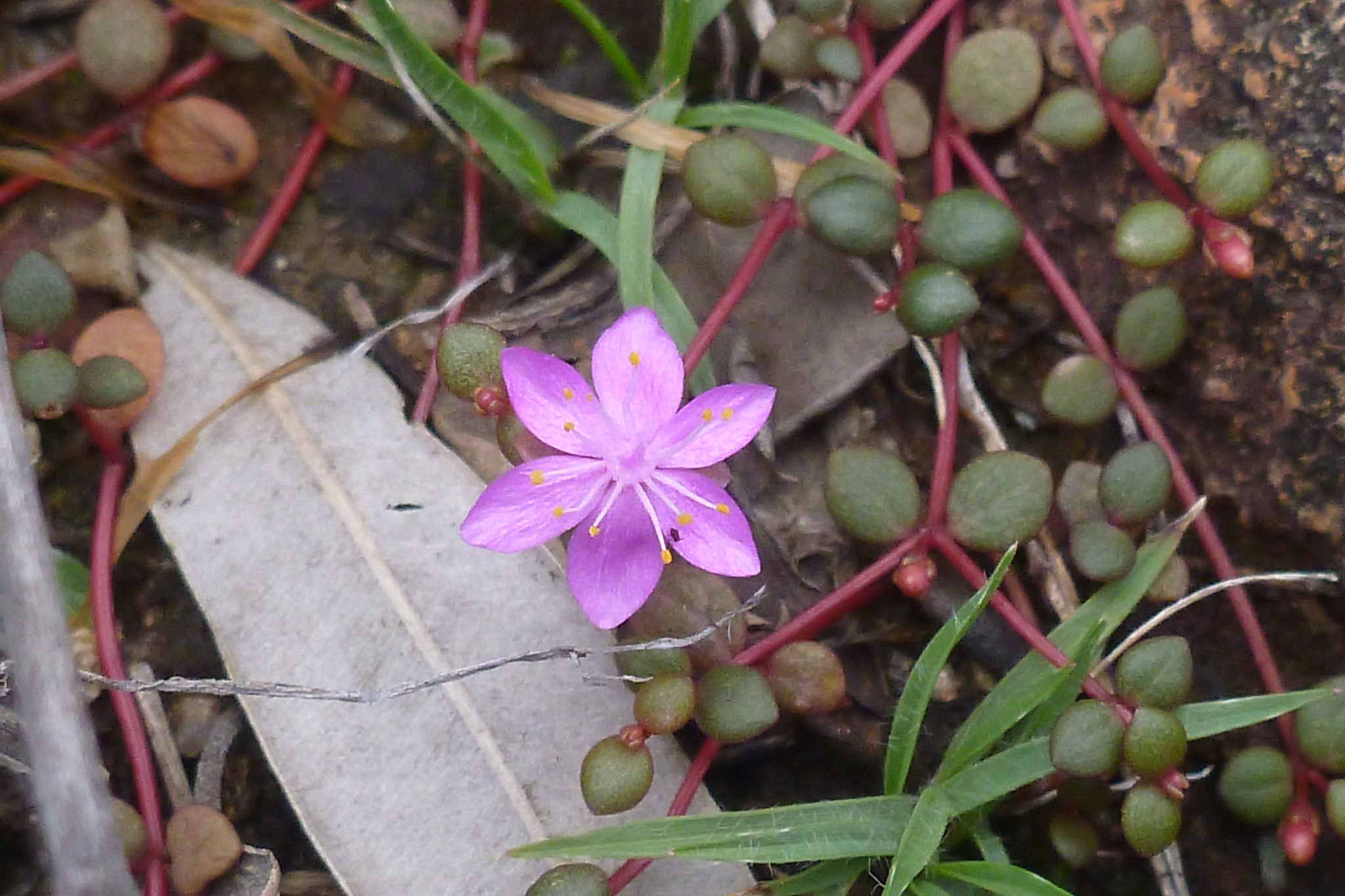

Scientific classification
- Kingdom: Plantae
- Clade: Embryophytes
- Clade: Tracheophytes
- Clade: Angiosperms
- Clade: Eudicots
- Order: Caryophyllales
- Family: Portulacaceae
- Genus: Portulaca
- Species: P. bicolor

Binomial name
- Portulaca bicolor F.Muell.

= Portulaca bicolor =

Species of flowering plant

Portulaca bicolor is a succulent species of the family Portulacaceae with cylindrical leaves and red stems. Flowering all year, the plant is common to coastal regions of Australia.
