= Portulaca samhaensis =

Conservation status
- Endangered (IUCN 3.1)

Scientific classification
- Kingdom: Plantae
- Clade: Tracheophytes
- Clade: Angiosperms
- Clade: Eudicots
- Order: Caryophyllales
- Family: Portulacaceae
- Genus: Portulaca
- Species: P. samhaensis

Binomial name
- Portulaca samhaensis A.G.Mill.

Species of flowering plant

Portulaca samhaensis is a species of flowering plant in the purslane family, Portulacaceae. It is endemic to Socotra, part of Yemen. Its natural habitat is subtropical or tropical dry shrubland. It is threatened by habitat loss.
