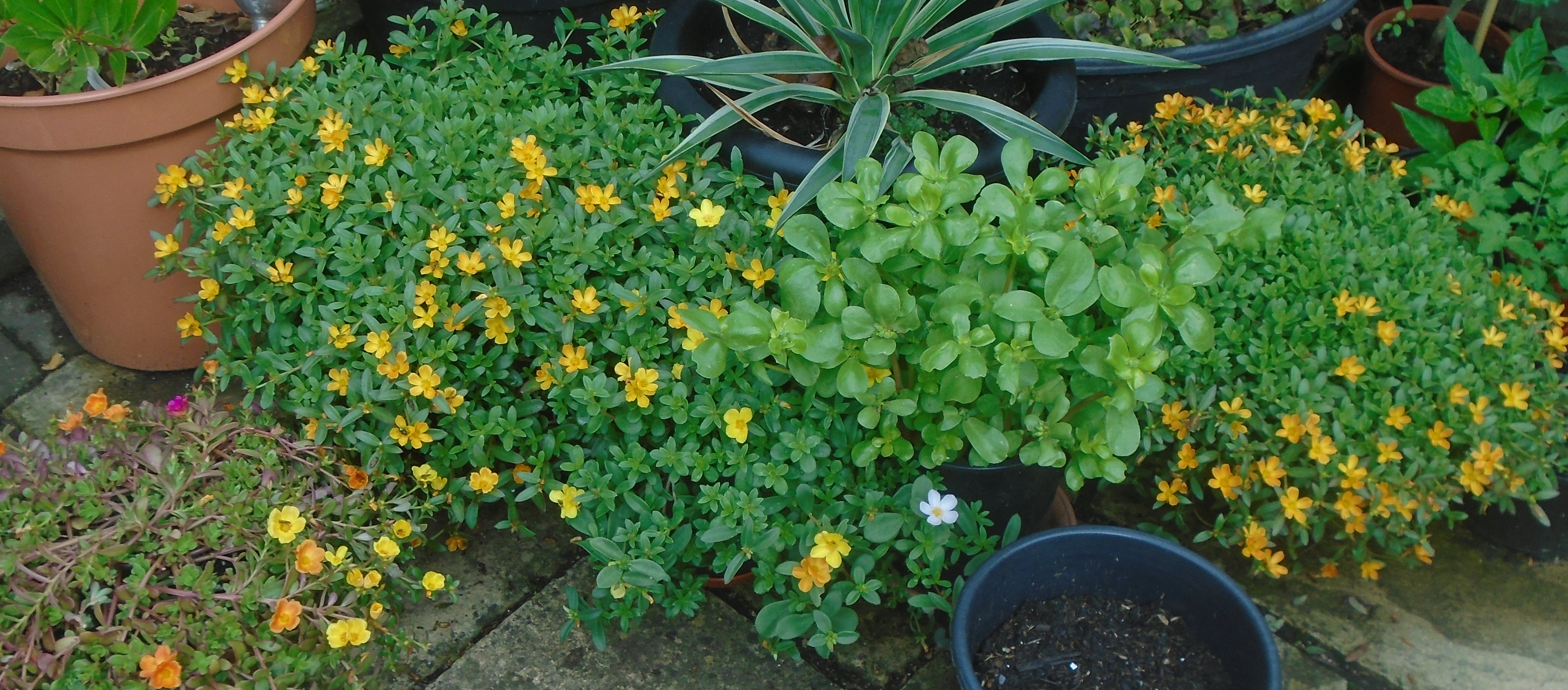
- A large array of Portulaca umbraticola and Portulaca oleracea (middle right)

Scientific classification
- Kingdom: Plantae
- Clade: Embryophytes
- Clade: Tracheophytes
- Clade: Angiosperms
- Clade: Eudicots
- Order: Caryophyllales
- Suborder: Portulacineae
- Family: Portulacaceae; Juss.

Genera
- Portulaca

= Portulacaceae =

Family of flowering plants

The Portulacaceae are a family of flowering plants, comprising 115 species in a single genus Portulaca. Formerly some 20 genera with about 500 species, were placed there, but it is now restricted to encompass only one genus. It is also known as the purslane family. It has a cosmopolitan distribution, with the highest diversity in semiarid regions of the Southern Hemisphere in Africa, Australia, and South America, but with a few species also extending north into Arctic regions. The family is very similar to the Caryophyllaceae, differing in the calyx, which has only two sepals.

The APG II system (2003; unchanged from the APG system of 1998) assigns it to the order Caryophyllales in the clade core eudicots. In the APG III system, several genera were moved to the Montiaceae, Didiereaceae, Anacampserotaceae and Talinaceae, thus making the family monotypic and only containing the genus Portulaca.

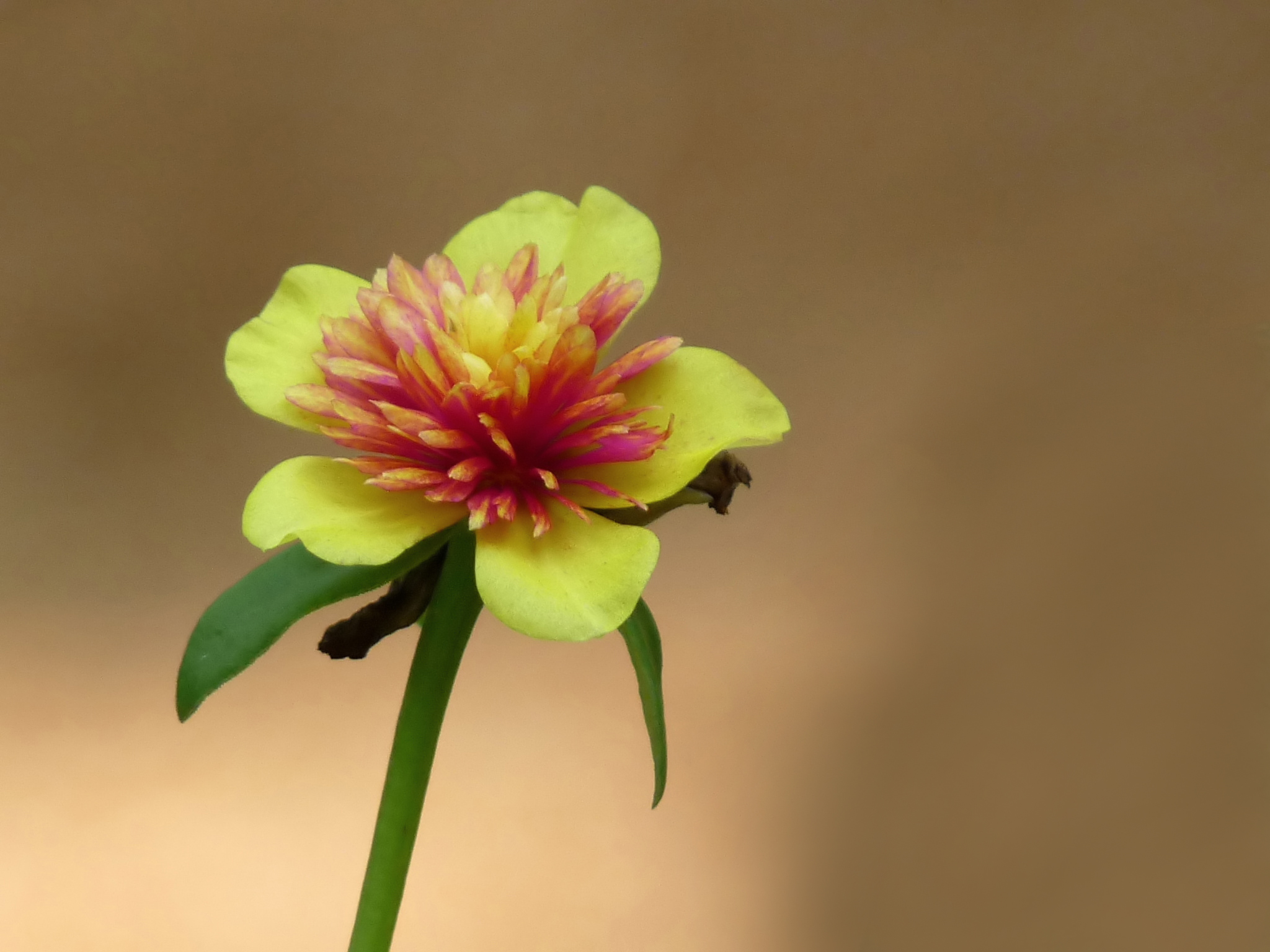
Portulaca 'All Aglow'

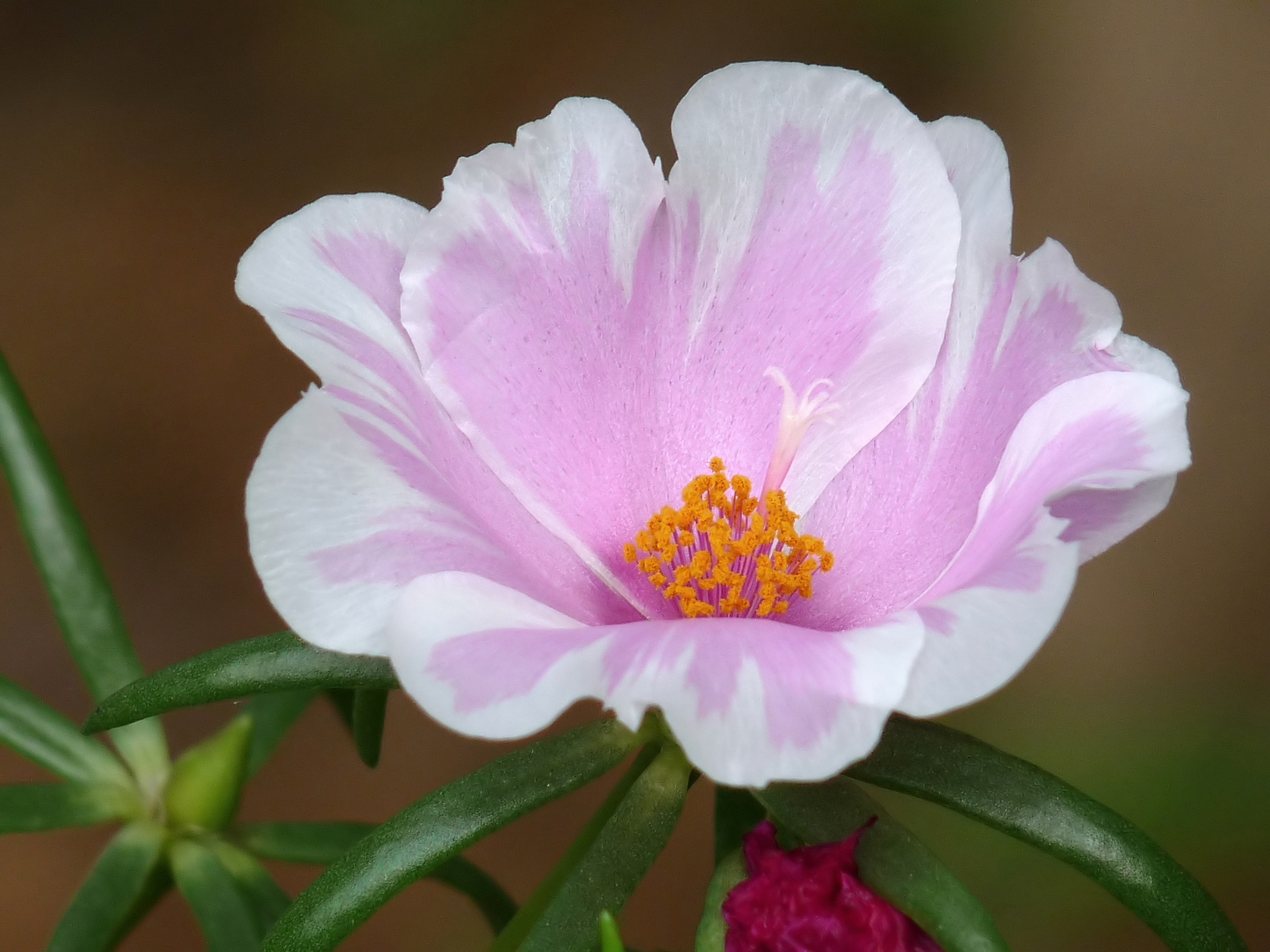
Portulaca grandiflora 'Bicolor'

== Species ==
The following species are accepted:

- Portulaca africana (Danin & H.G.Baker) Danin
- Portulaca almeviae Ocampo
- Portulaca amilis Speg. – Paraguayan purslane
- Portulaca anceps A.Rich.
- Portulaca argentinensis Speg.
- Portulaca aurantiaca Proctor
- Portulaca australis Endl.
- Portulaca badamica S.R.Yadav & Dalavi
- Portulaca bicolor F.Muell. – Australian pigweed
- Portulaca biloba Urb. – Cuban purslane
- Portulaca brevifolia Urb.
- Portulaca bulbifera M.G.Gilbert
- Portulaca californica D.Legrand
- Portulaca canariensis Danin & Reyes-Bet.
- Portulaca cardenasiana D.Legrand – Puerto Rican purslane
- Portulaca caulerpoides Britton & P.Wilson
- Portulaca centrali-africana R.E.Fr.
- Portulaca chacoana D.Legrand
- Portulaca ciferrii Chiov.
- Portulaca clavigera R.Geesink
- Portulaca colombiana D.Legrand
- Portulaca commutata M.G.Gilbert
- Portulaca confertifolia Hauman
- Portulaca conoidea S.M.Phillips
- Portulaca constricta M.G.Gilbert
- Portulaca conzattii P.Wilson
- Portulaca coralloides S.M.Phillips
- Portulaca cryptopetala Speg.
- Portulaca cubensis Britton & P.Wilson
- Portulaca cyclophylla F.Muell.
- Portulaca cypria Danin
- Portulaca daninii Galasso, Banfi & Soldano
- Portulaca decipiens Poelln.
- Portulaca decorticans M.G.Gilbert
- Portulaca dhofarica M.G.Gilbert
- Portulaca diegoi Mattos
- Portulaca digyna F.Muell.
- Portulaca dodomaensis M.G.Gilbert
- Portulaca echinosperma Hauman
- Portulaca edulis Danin & Bagella
- Portulaca elatior Mart. ex Rohrb.
- Portulaca elongata Rusby
- Portulaca eruca Hauman
- Portulaca erythraeae Schweinf.
- Portulaca fascicularis Peter
- Portulaca filifolia F.Muell.
- Portulaca filsonii J.H.Willis
- Portulaca fischeri Pax
- Portulaca fluvialis D.Legrand
- Portulaca foliosa Ker Gawl.
- Portulaca fragilis Poelln.
- Portulaca frieseana Poelln.
- Portulaca fulgens Griseb.
- Portulaca gilliesii Hook.
- Portulaca giuliettiae T.Vieira & A.A.Coelho
- Portulaca goiasensis T.Vieira & A.A.Coelho
- Portulaca gracilis Poelln.
- Portulaca grandiflora Hook. – moss-rose purslane
- Portulaca grandis Peter
- Portulaca granulatostellulata (Poelln.) Ricceri & Arrigoni
- Portulaca greenwayi M.G.Gilbert
- Portulaca guanajuatensis Ocampo
- Portulaca halimoides L. – silkcotton purslane
- Portulaca hatschbachii D.Legrand
- Portulaca hereroensis Schinz
- Portulaca heterophylla Peter
- Portulaca hirsutissima Cambess.
- Portulaca hoehnei D.Legrand
- Portulaca howellii (D.Legrand) Eliasson
- Portulaca humilis Peter
- Portulaca impolita (Danin & H.G.Baker) Danin
- Portulaca insignis Steyerm.
- Portulaca intraterranea J.M.Black
- Portulaca johnstonii Henrickson
- Portulaca juliomartinezii Ocampo
- Portulaca kermesina N.E.Br.
- Portulaca kuriensis M.G.Gilbert
- Portulaca lakshminarasimhaniana S.R.Yadav & Dalavi
- Portulaca lutea Sol. ex G.Forst. – yellow purslane
- Portulaca macbridei D.Legrand
- Portulaca macrantha Ricceri & Arrigoni
- Portulaca macrorhiza R.Geesink
- Portulaca macrosperma D.Legrand
- Portulaca masonii D.Legrand
- Portulaca massaica S.M.Phillips
- Portulaca matthewsii Ocampo
- Portulaca mauritiensis Poelln.
- Portulaca mexicana P.Wilson
- Portulaca meyeri D.Legrand
- Portulaca minensis D.Legrand
- Portulaca minuta Correll
- Portulaca molokiniensis Hobdy – ʻIhi
- Portulaca monanthoides Lodé
- Portulaca mucronata Link
- Portulaca mucronulata D.Legrand
- Portulaca nicaraguensis (Danin & H.G.Baker) Danin
- Portulaca nitida (Danin & H.G.Baker) Ricceri & Arrigoni
- Portulaca nivea Poelln.
- Portulaca nogalensis Chiov.
- Portulaca oblonga Peter
- Portulaca obtusa Poelln.
- Portulaca obtusifolia D.Legrand
- Portulaca okinawensis E.Walker & Tawada
- Portulaca oleracea L. – common purslane, pigweed
- Portulaca oligosperma F.Muell.
- Portulaca olosirwa S.M.Phillips
- Portulaca papillatostellulata (Danin & H.G.Baker) Danin
- Portulaca papulifera D.Legrand
- Portulaca papulosa Schltdl.
- Portulaca paucistaminata Poelln.
- Portulaca perennis R.E.Fr.
- Portulaca peteri Poelln.
- Portulaca philippii I.M.Johnst.
- Portulaca pilosa L. – shaggy purslane
- Portulaca psammotropha Hance
- Portulaca pusilla Kunth
- Portulaca pygmaea Steyerm.
- Portulaca quadrifida L. – chickenweed purslane
- Portulaca ragonesei D.Legrand
- Portulaca ramosa Peter
- Portulaca rausii Danin
- Portulaca rhodesiana R.A.Dyer & E.A.Bruce
- Portulaca rotundifolia R.E.Fr.
- Portulaca rubricaulis Kunth – redstem purslane
- Portulaca rzedowskiana Ocampo
- Portulaca samhaensis A.G.Mill.
- Portulaca samoensis Poelln.
- Portulaca sanctae-martae Poelln.
- Portulaca sardoa Danin, Bagella & Marrosu
- Portulaca saxifragoides Welw. ex Oliv.
- Portulaca sclerocarpa A.Gray – ʻIhi makole
- Portulaca sedifolia N.E.Br.
- Portulaca sedoides Welw. ex Oliv.
- Portulaca sicula Danin, Domina & Raimondo
- Portulaca smallii P.Wilson – Small's purslane
- Portulaca socotrana Domina & Raimondo
- Portulaca somalica N.E.Br.
- Portulaca stellulatotuberculata Poelln.
- Portulaca stuhlmannii Poelln.
- Portulaca suffrutescens Engelm. – shrubby purslane
- Portulaca suffruticosa Wight
- Portulaca sundaensis Poelln.
- Portulaca thellusonii Lindl.
- Portulaca tingoensis J.F.Macbr.
- Portulaca trianthemoides Bremek.
- Portulaca trituberculata Danin, Domina & Raimondo
- Portulaca tuberculata León
- Portulaca tuberosa Roxb.
- Portulaca umbraticola Kunth – wingpod purslane
- Portulaca werdermannii Poelln.
- Portulaca wightiana Wall. ex Wight & Arn.
- Portulaca yecorensis Henrickson & T.Van Devender
- Portulaca zaffranii Danin

=== Formerly placed here ===
- Anacampseros arachnoides (Haw.) Sims (as P. arachnoides Haw.)
- Anacampseros filamentosa subsp. filamentosa (as P. filamentosa Haw.)
- Anacampseros lanceolata subsp. lanceolata (as P. lanceolata Haw.)
- Anacampseros rufescens (Haw.) Sweet (as P. rufescens Haw.)
- Anacampseros telephiastrum DC. (as P. anacampseros L.)
- Montia howellii S. Watson
- Sesuvium portulacastrum (L.) L. (as P. portulacastrum L.)
- Talinum fruticosum (L.) Juss. (as P. fruticosa L. or P. triangularis Jacq.)
- Talinum paniculatum (Jacq.) Gaertn. (as P. paniculata Jacq. or P. patens L.)

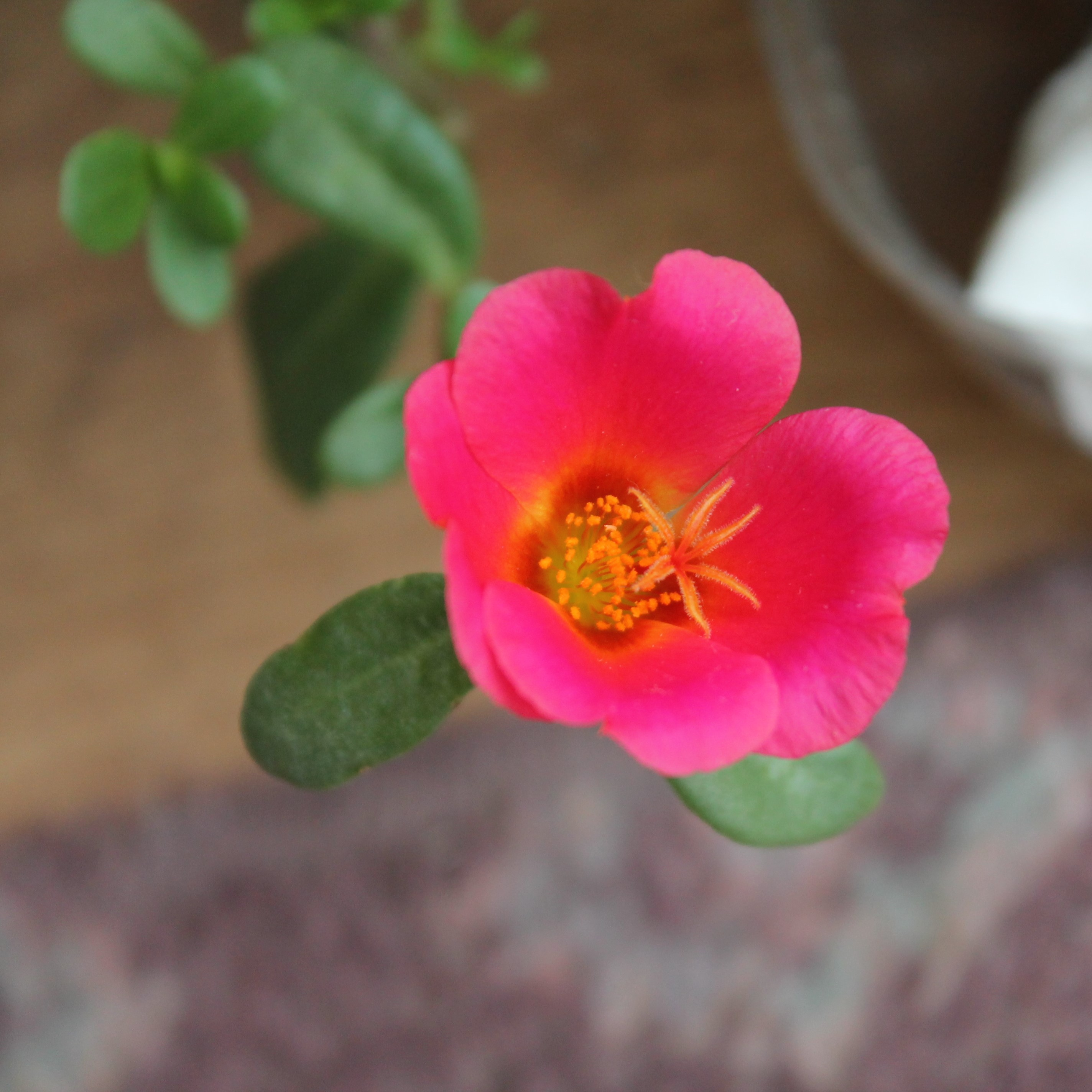
Pink Portulaca flower from volunteer plant growing in a pot indoors

== Uses ==
Common purslane (Portulaca oleracea) is widely consumed as an edible plant, and in some areas it is invasive. Portulaca grandiflora is a well-known ornamental garden plant. Purslanes are relished by chickens. Some Portulaca species are used as food plants by the larvae of some Lepidoptera species including the nutmeg moth (Hadula trifolii).

== Gallery ==
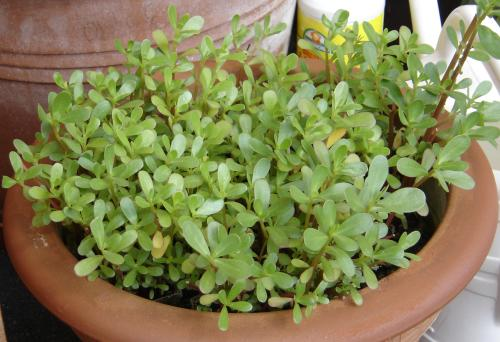
Purslane cultivar

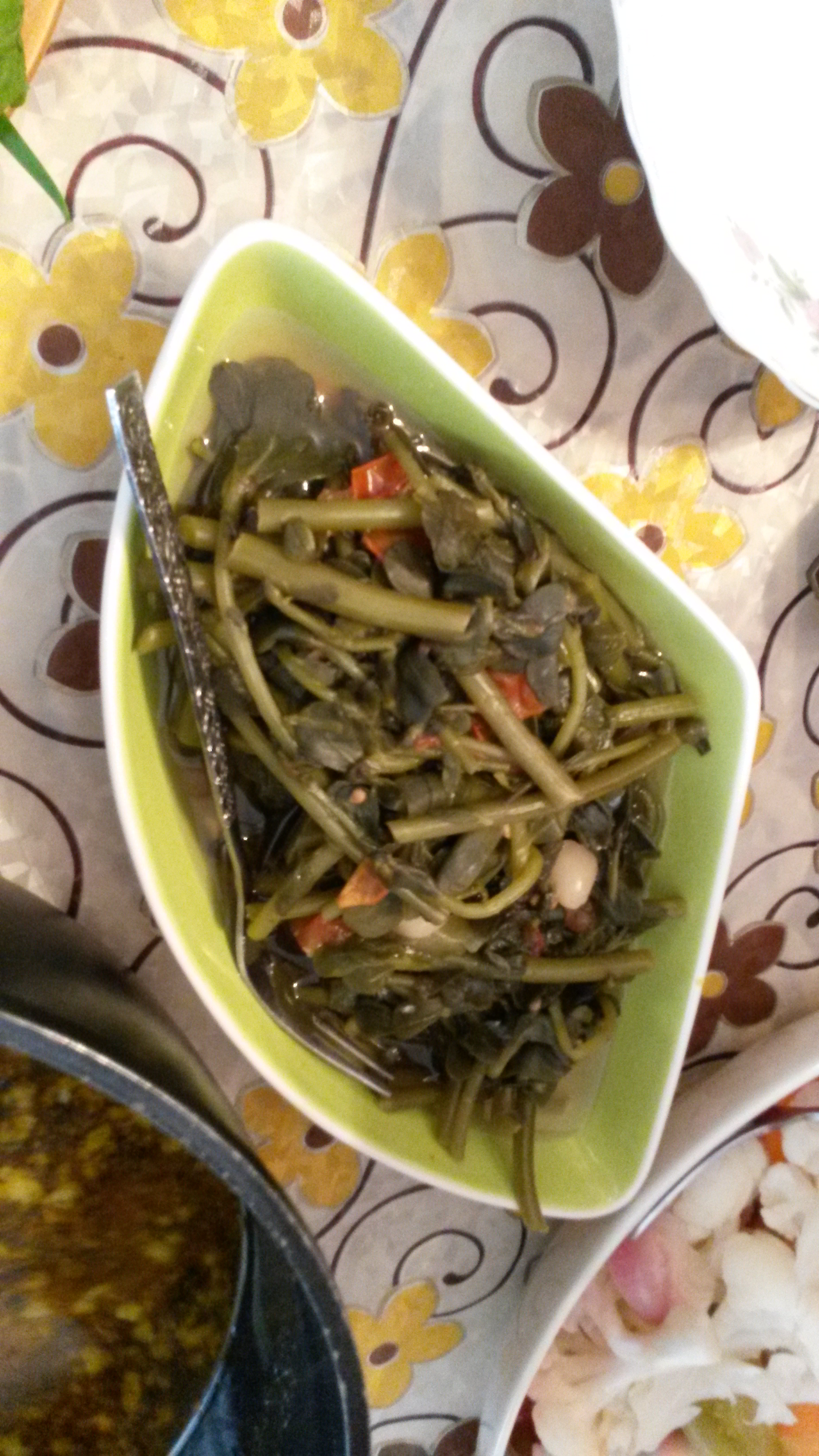
Pickled purslane stems consumed in Armenia

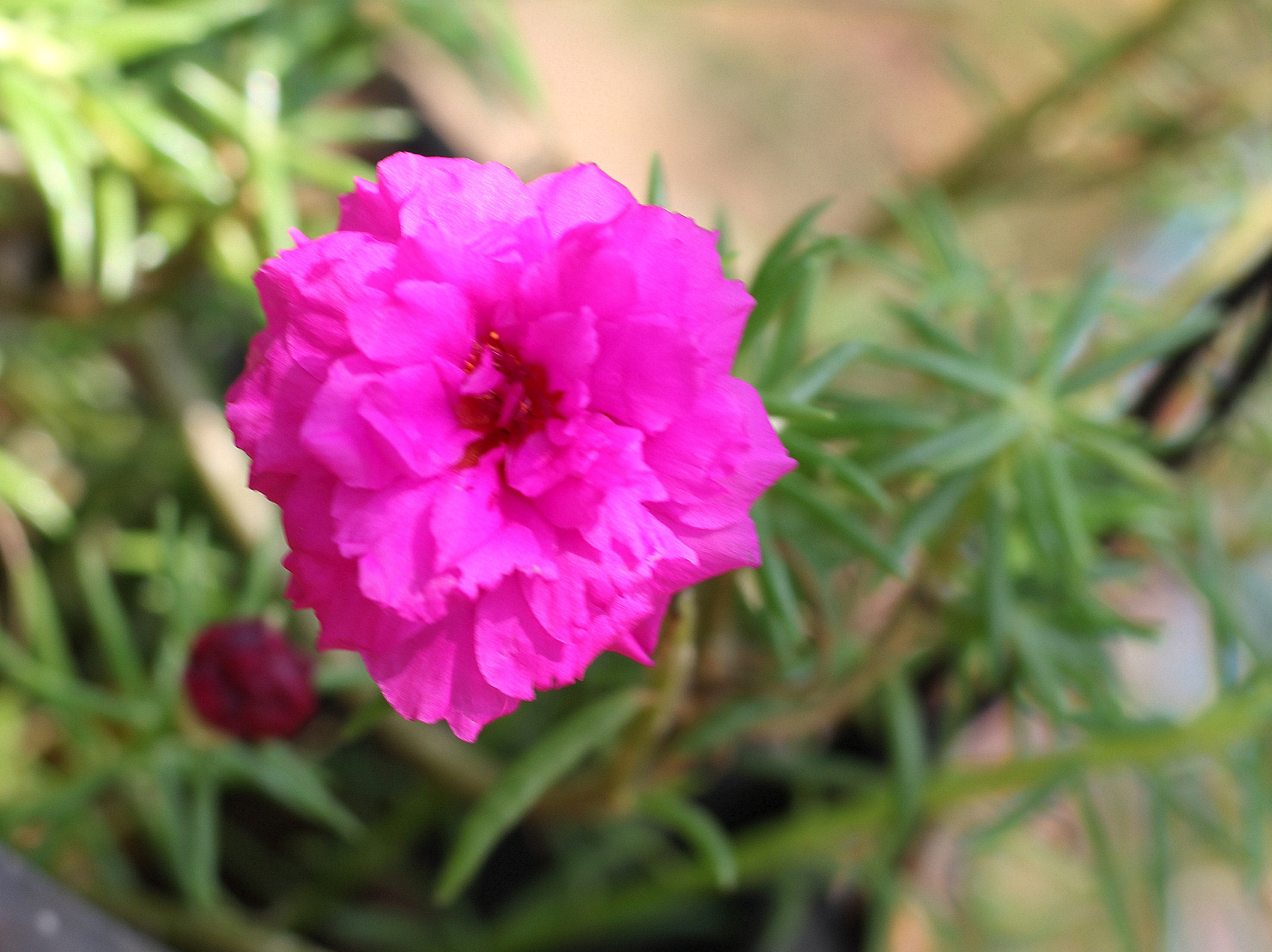
Portulaca flowers

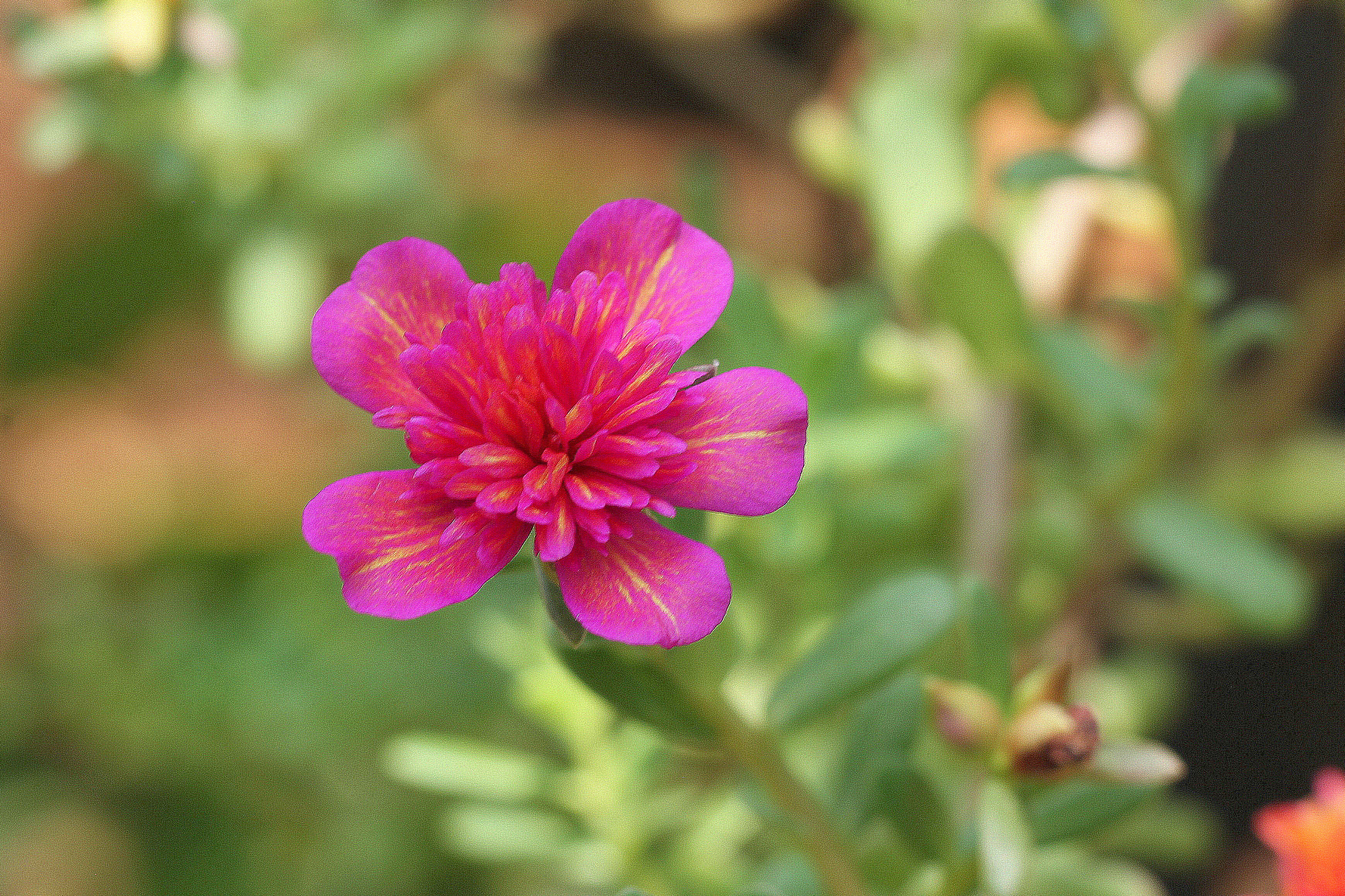
Portulaca flowers

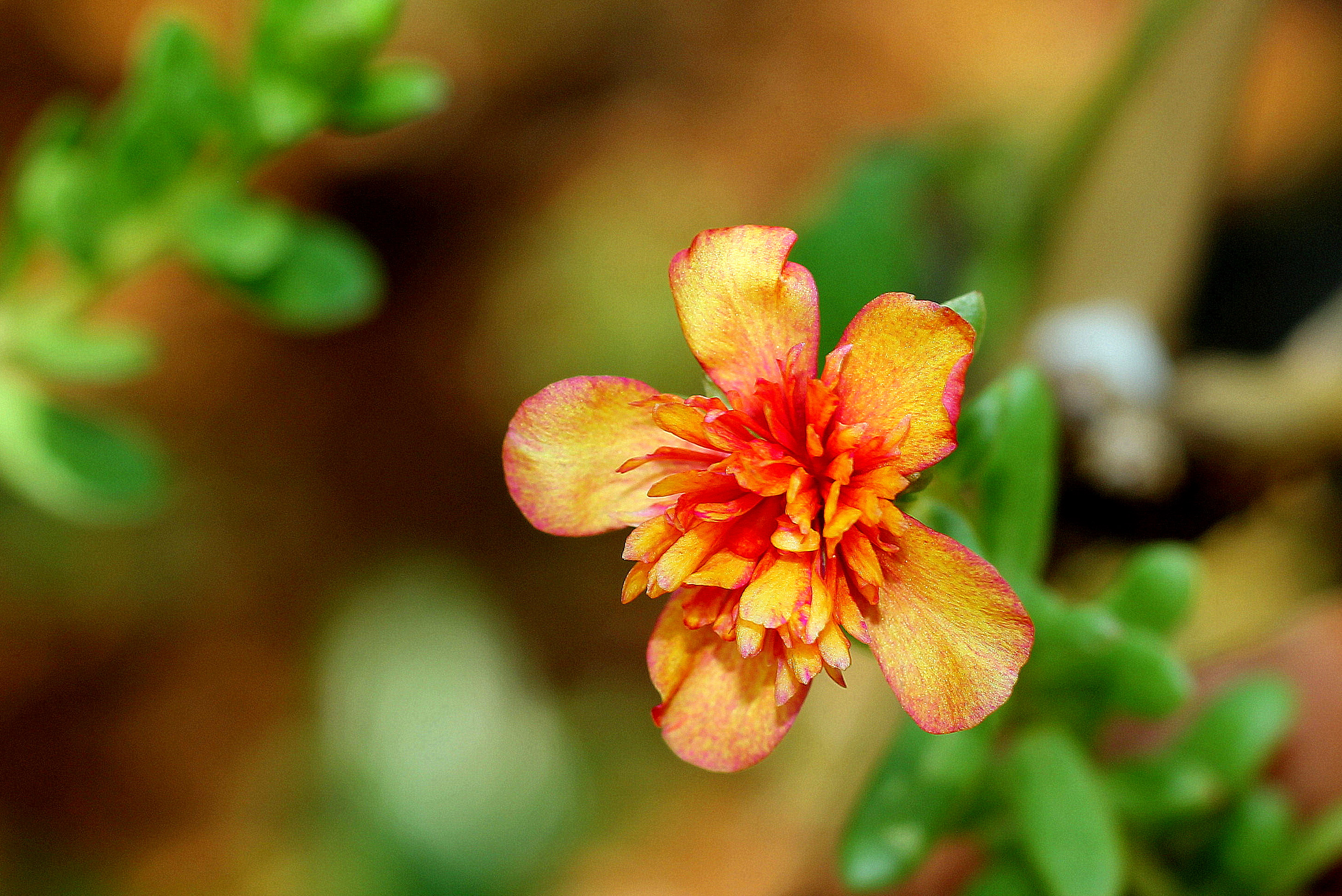
Portulaca flowers

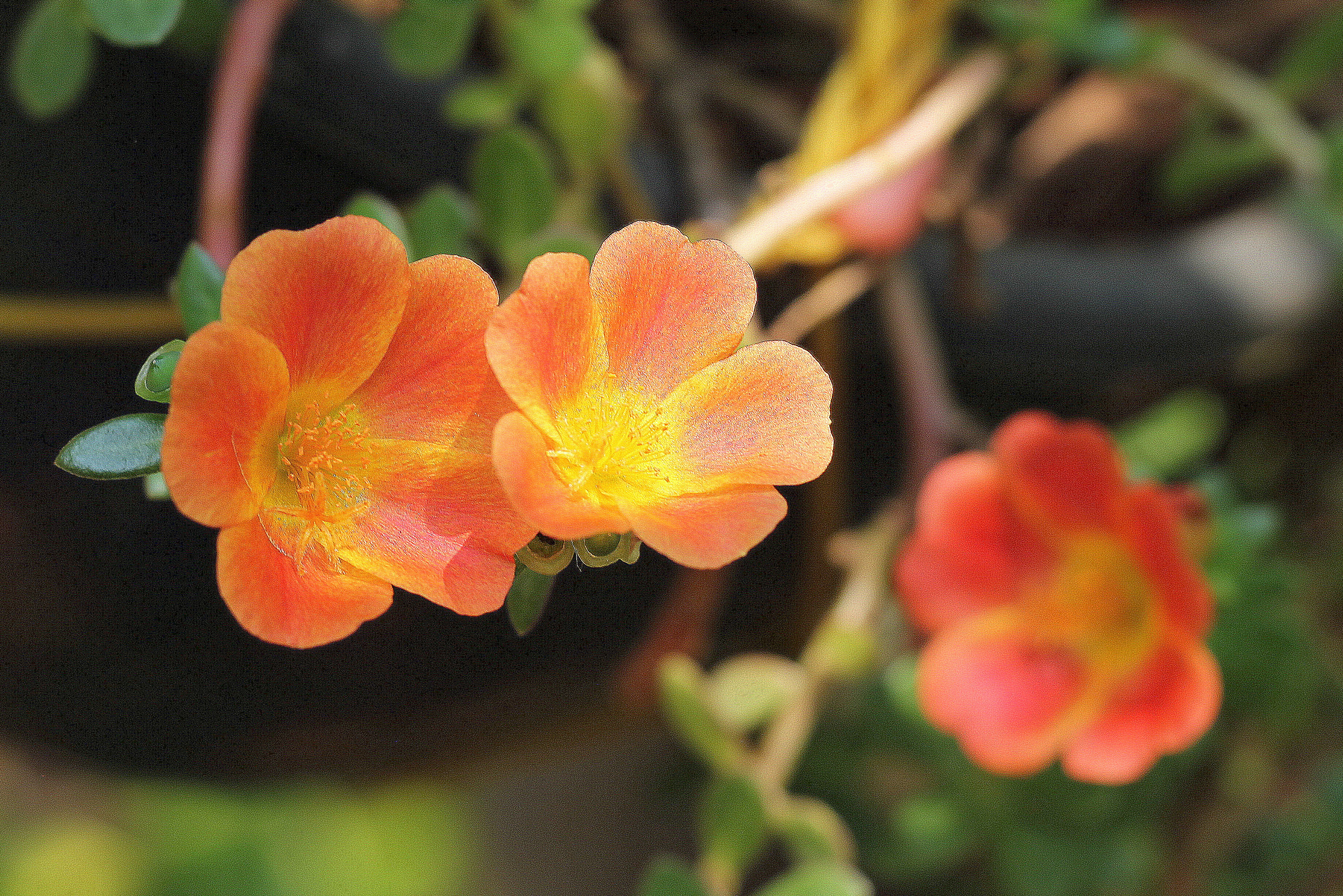
Portulaca flowers

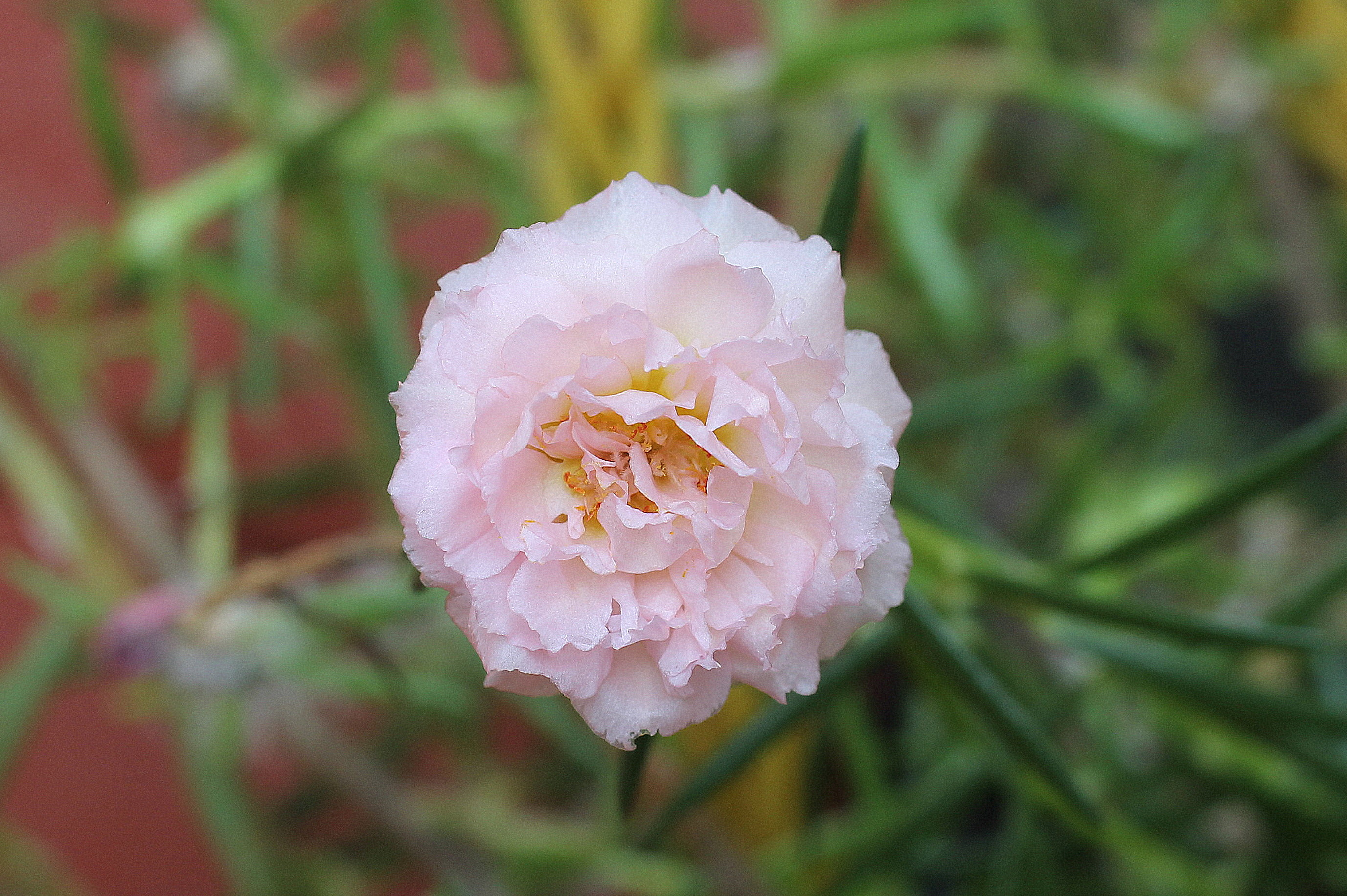
Portulaca flowers

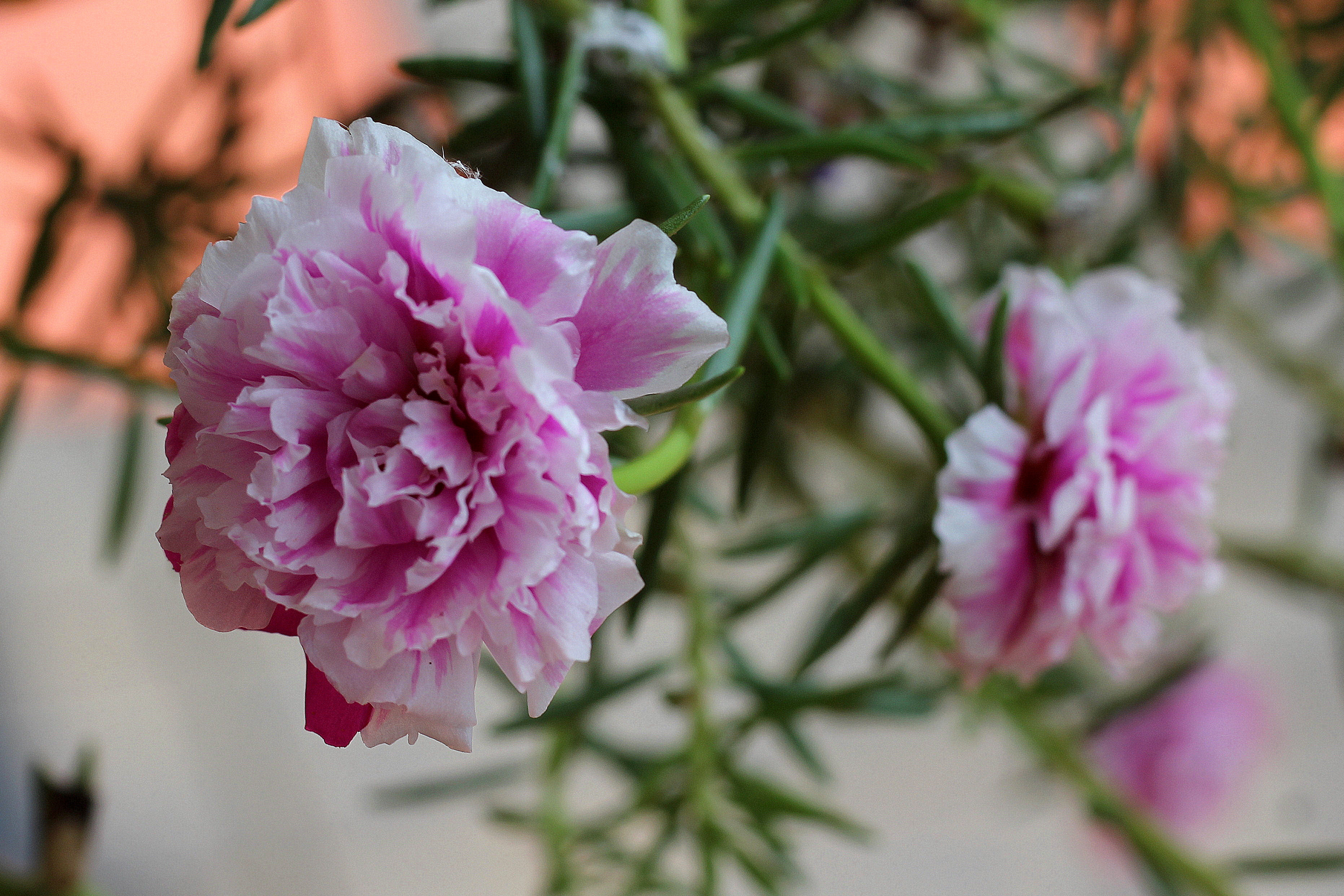
Portulaca flowers

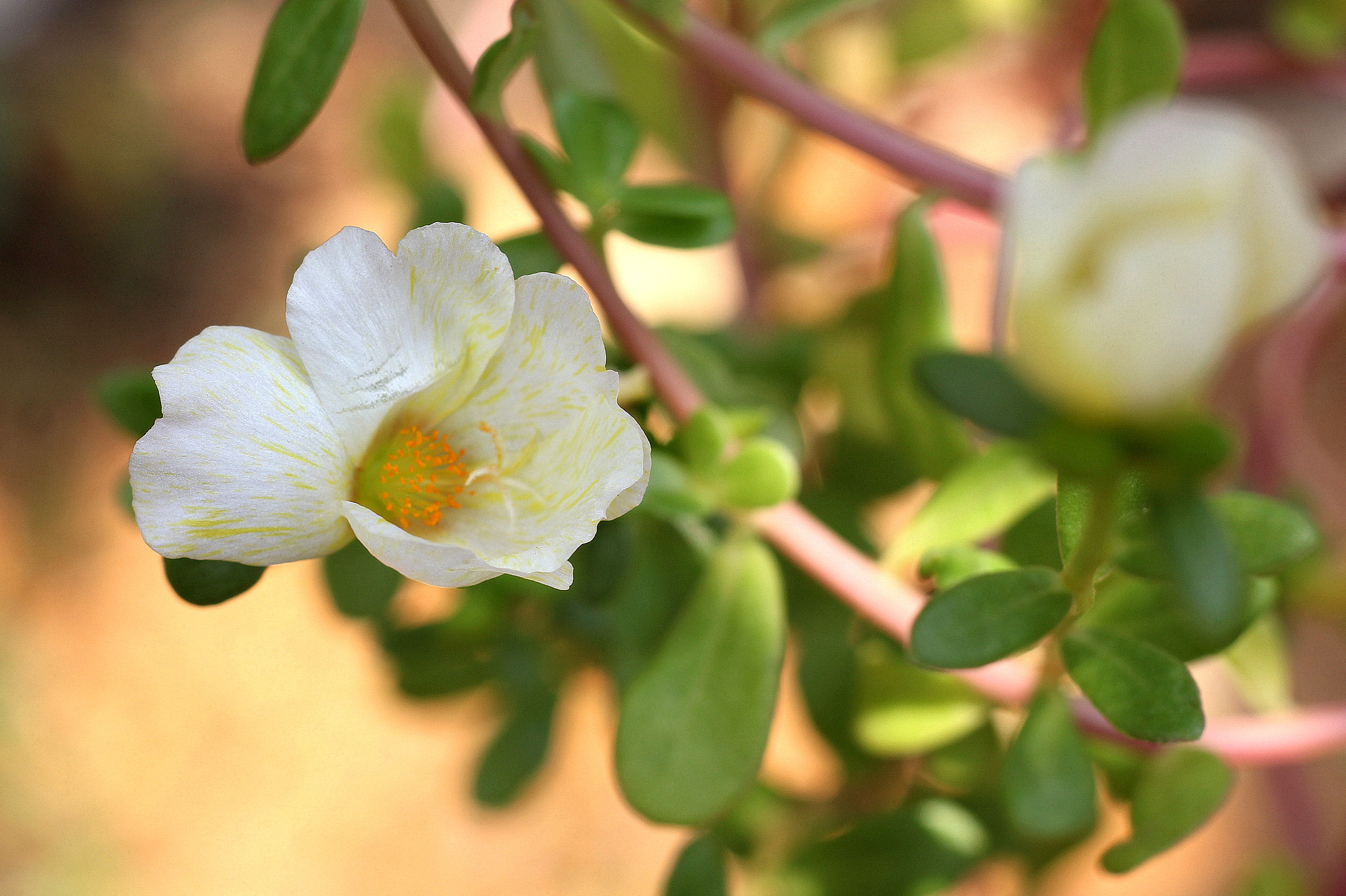
Portulaca flowers

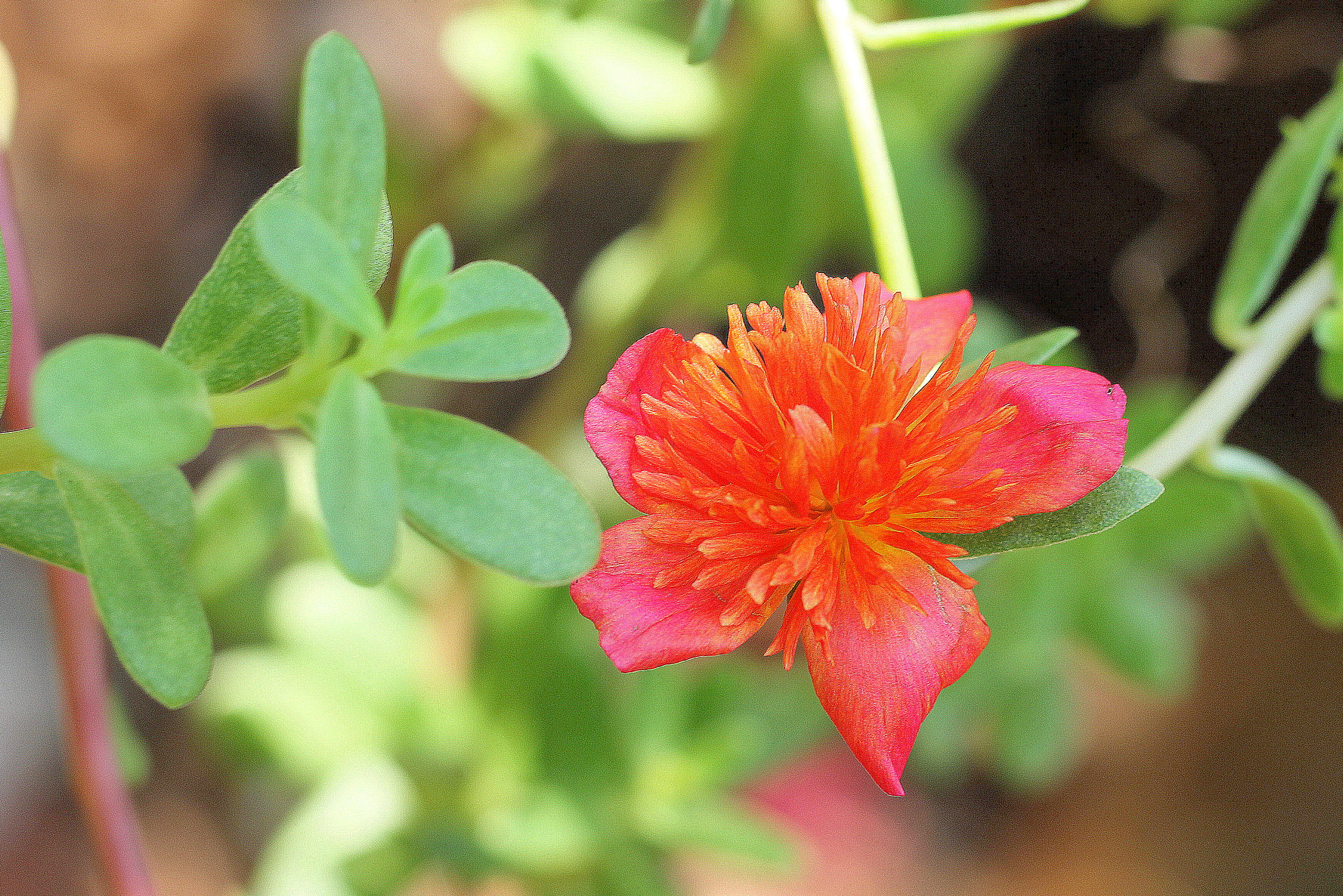
Portulaca flowers

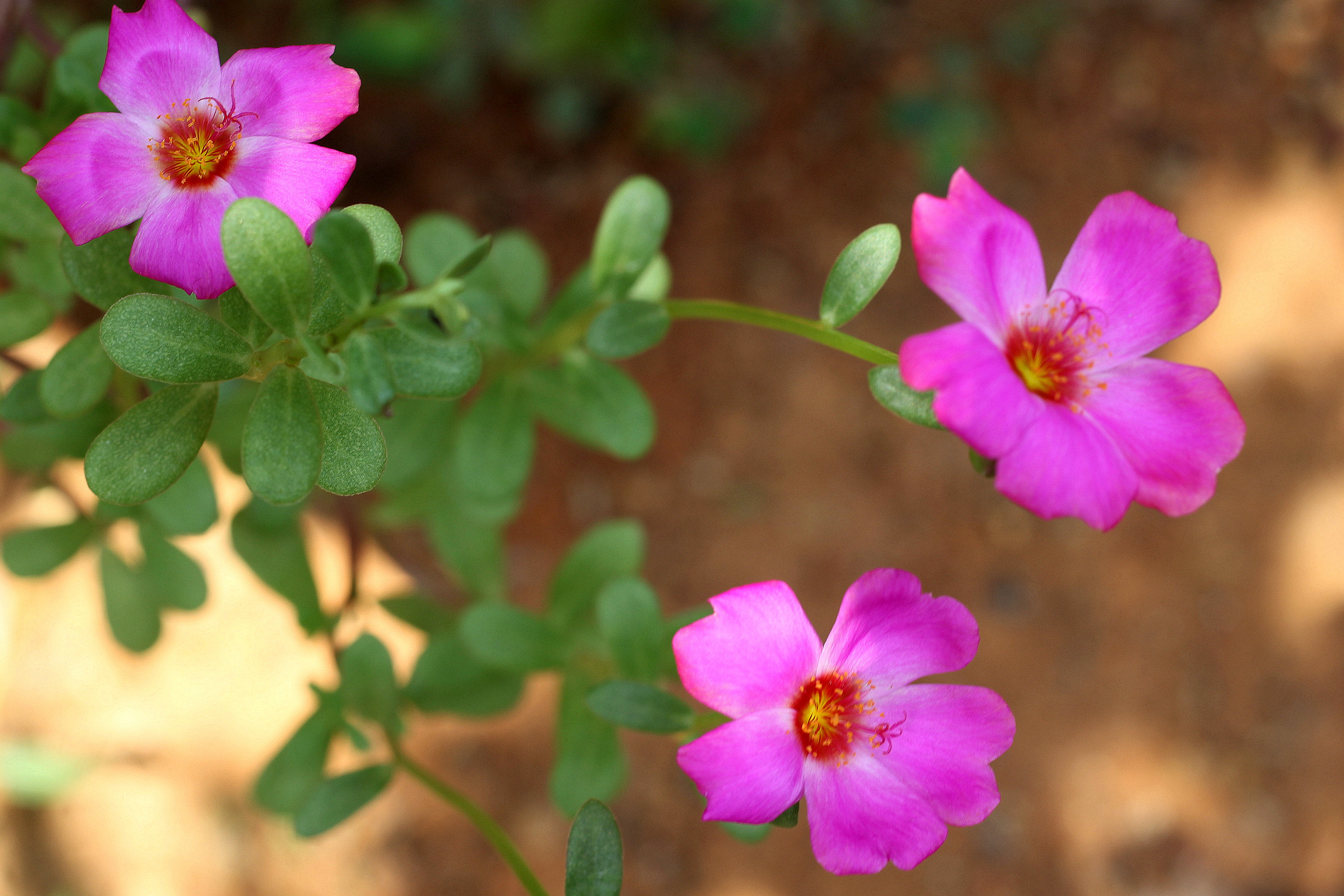
Portulaca flowers

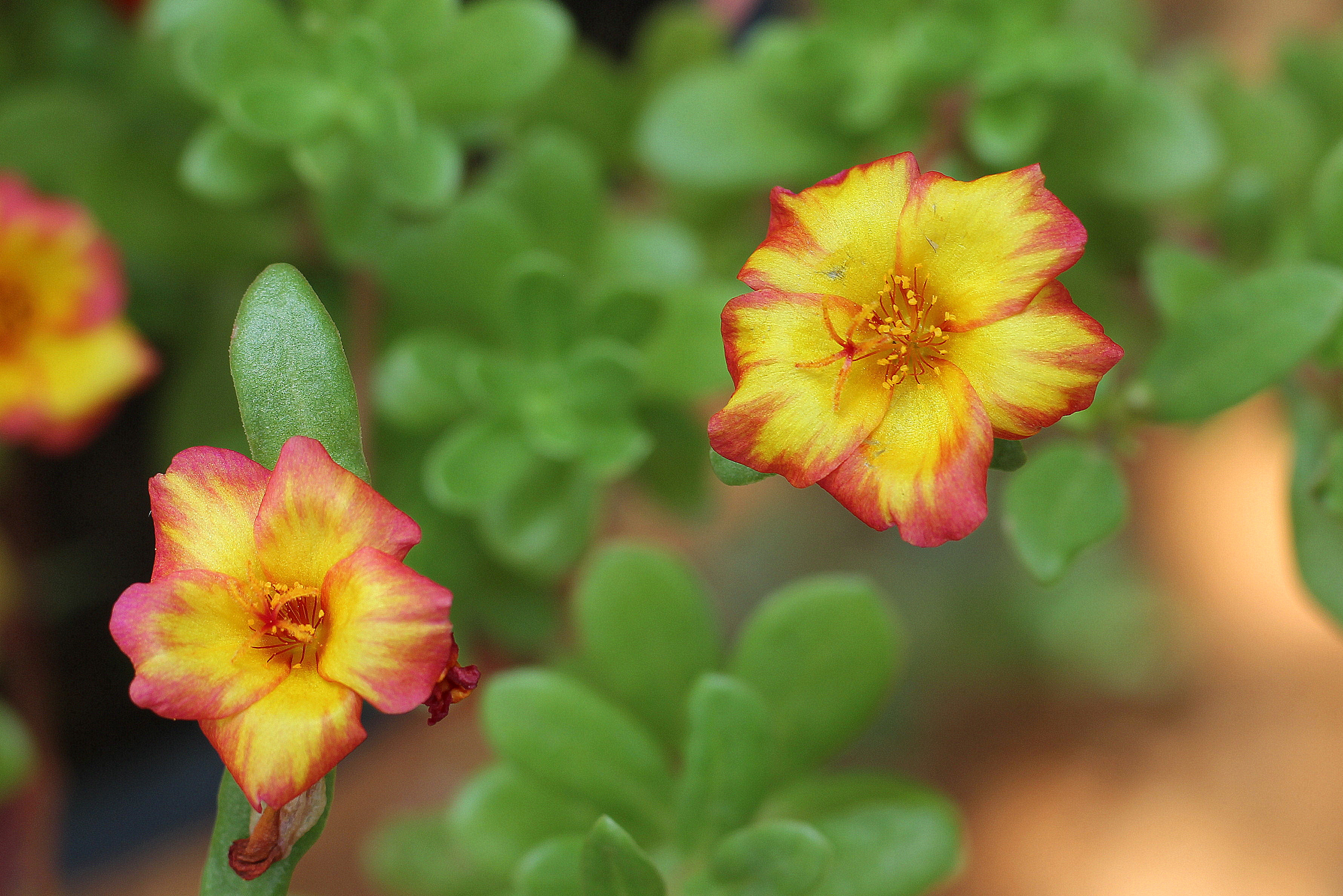
Portulaca flowers

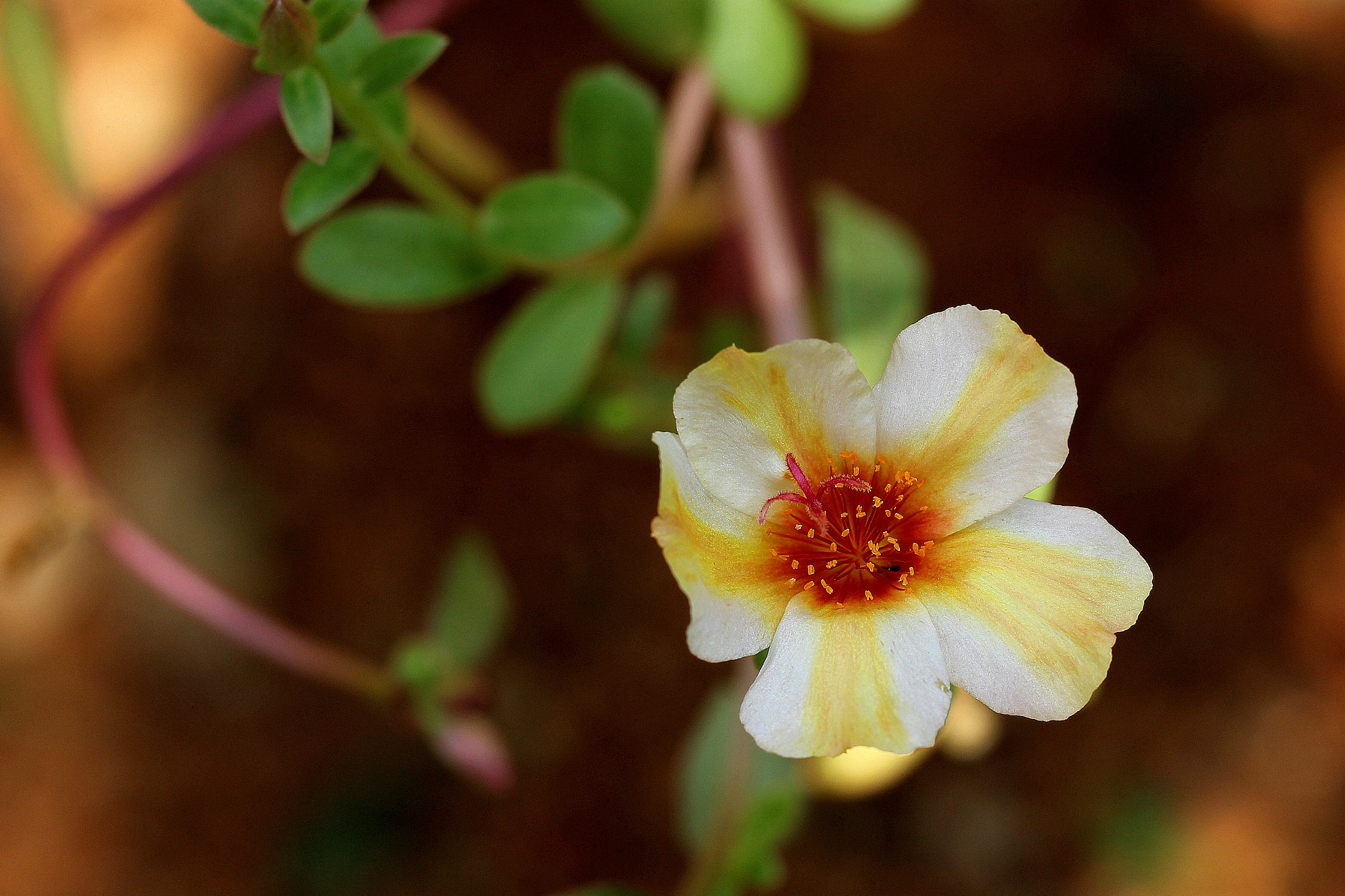
Portulaca flowers

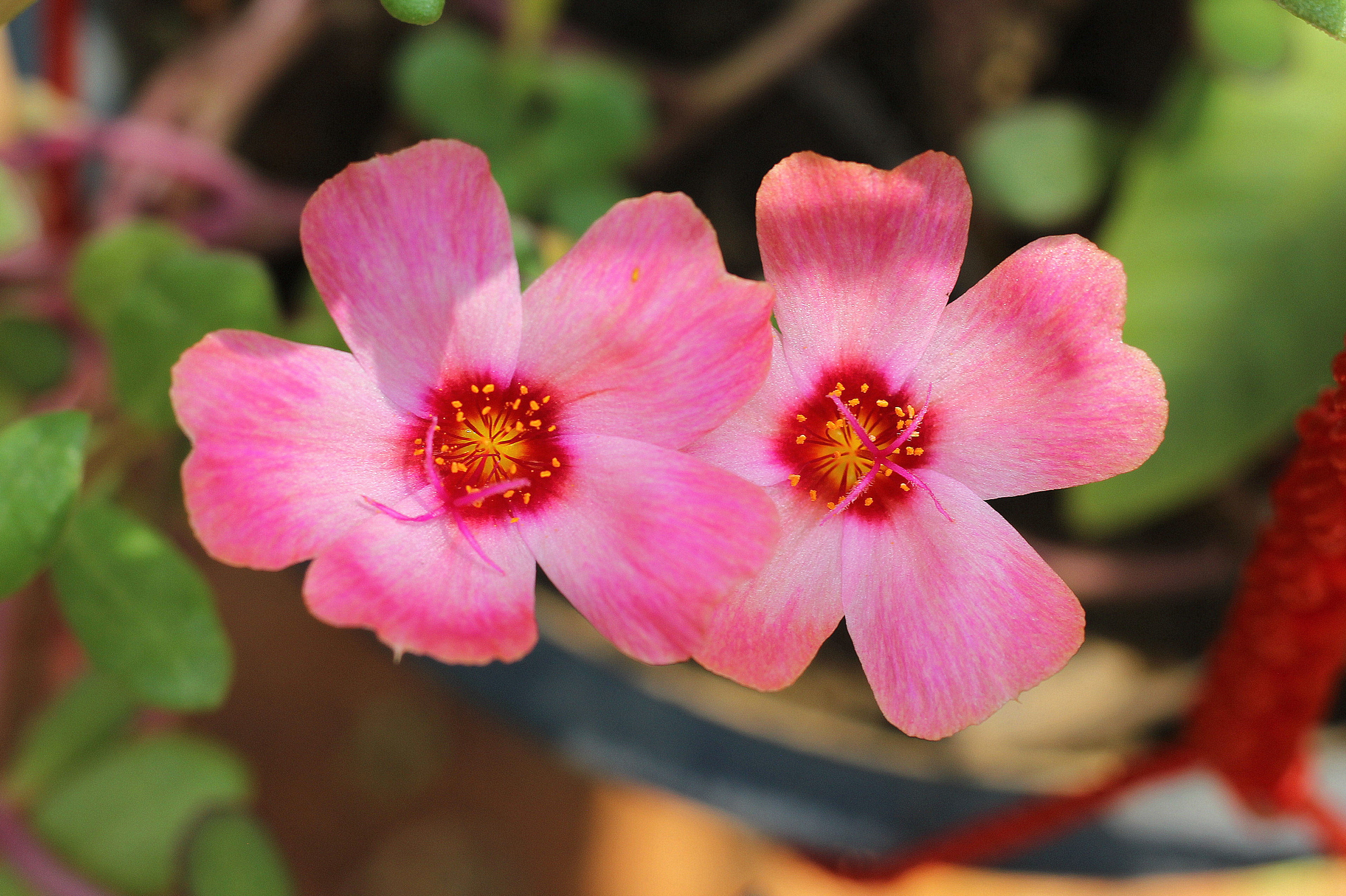
Portulaca flowers

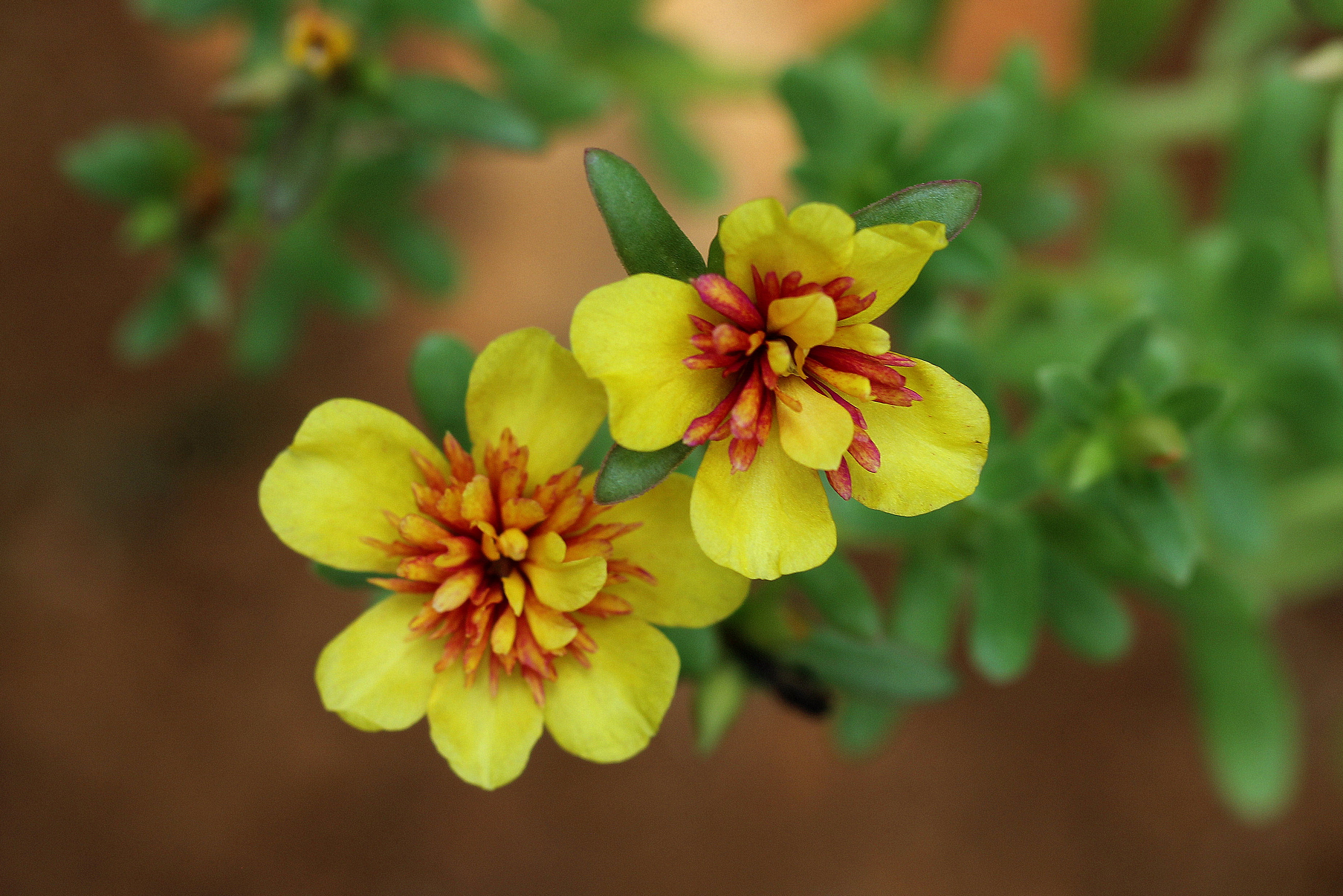
Portulaca flowers

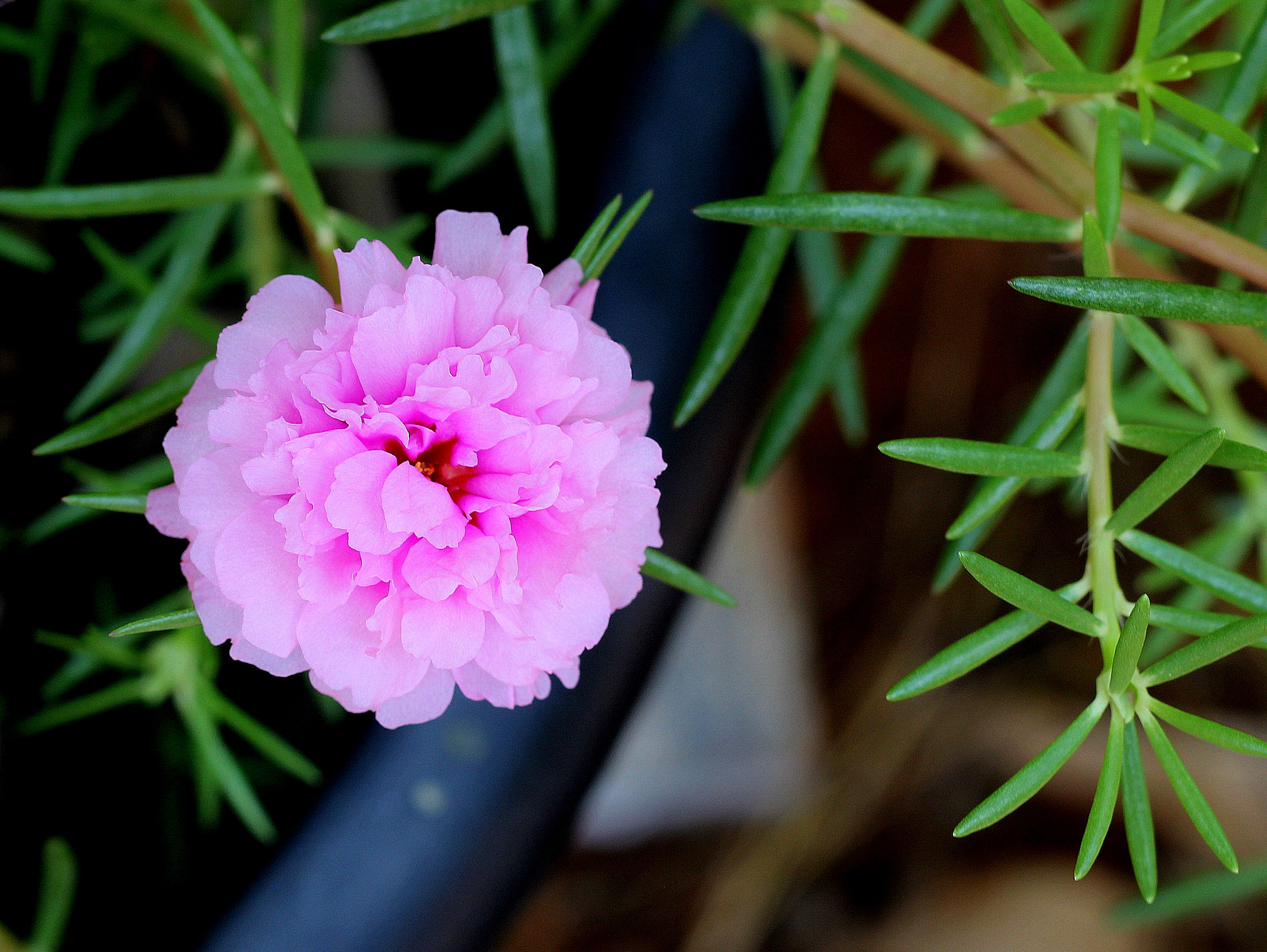
Portulaca flowers
