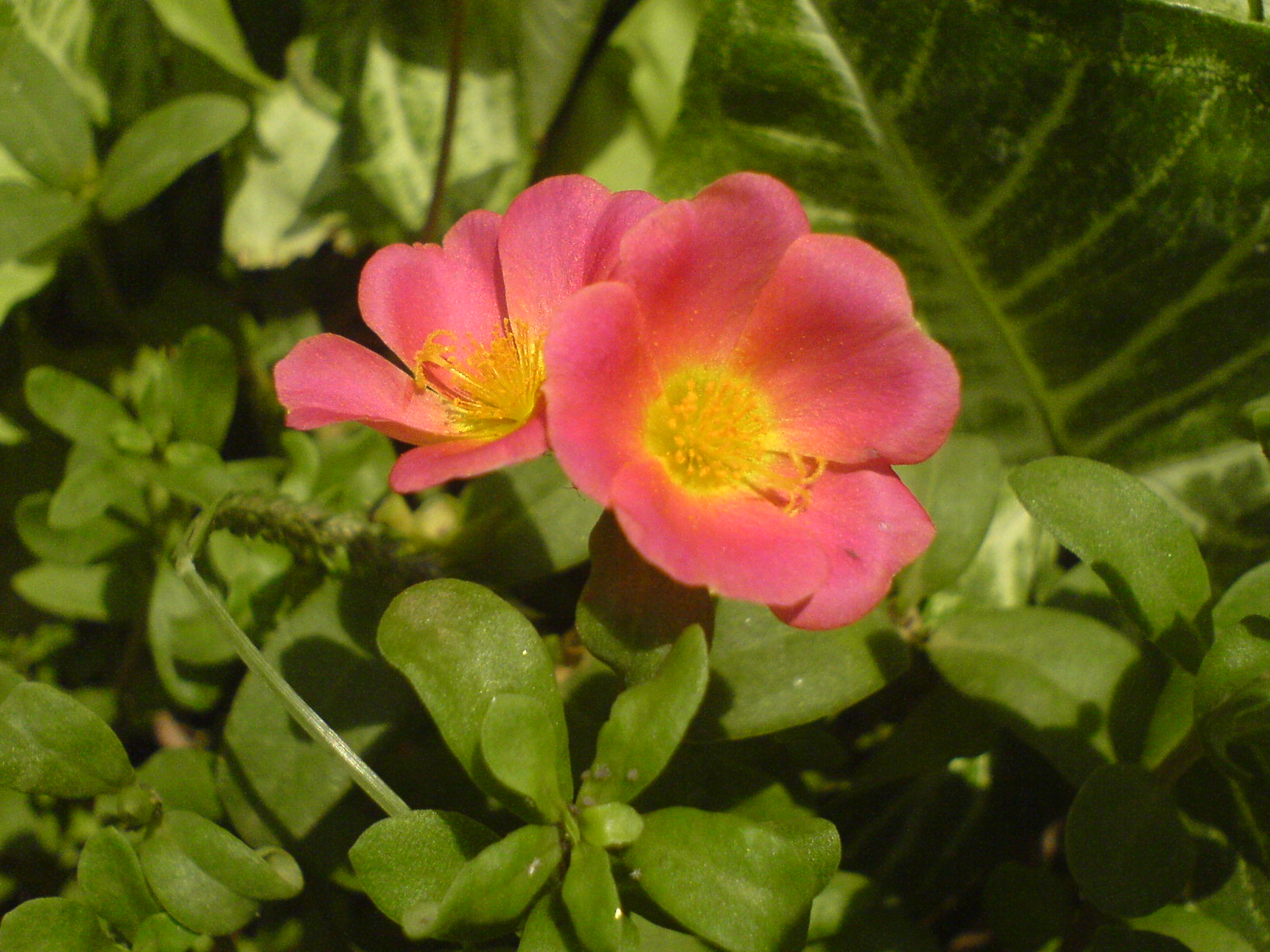

Scientific classification
- Kingdom: Plantae
- Clade: Tracheophytes
- Clade: Angiosperms
- Clade: Eudicots
- Order: Caryophyllales
- Family: Portulacaceae
- Genus: Portulaca
- Species: P. umbraticola

Binomial name
- Portulaca umbraticola Kunth

= Portulaca umbraticola =

Species of plant

Portulaca umbraticola – ornamental purslane

Portulaca umbraticola, also known as the wingpod purslane, is an annual or short-lived perennial succulent in the genus of flowering plants Portulaca. Native to the New World, it is now found as a garden plant in the Old World due to its ornamental nature.

== Description ==
Although this species can be easily mistaken for P. oleracea, its foliage tends to be much smaller and wider than that of other species. Flower colours range from yellow, pink, and orange. The entire plant including the stems, leaves, flowers and roots are all edible. Plants grow up to 25 cm tall.

== Subspecies ==
Three subspecies are recognized: P. u. coronata, P. u. lanceolata, and the nominate P. u. umbraticola.
