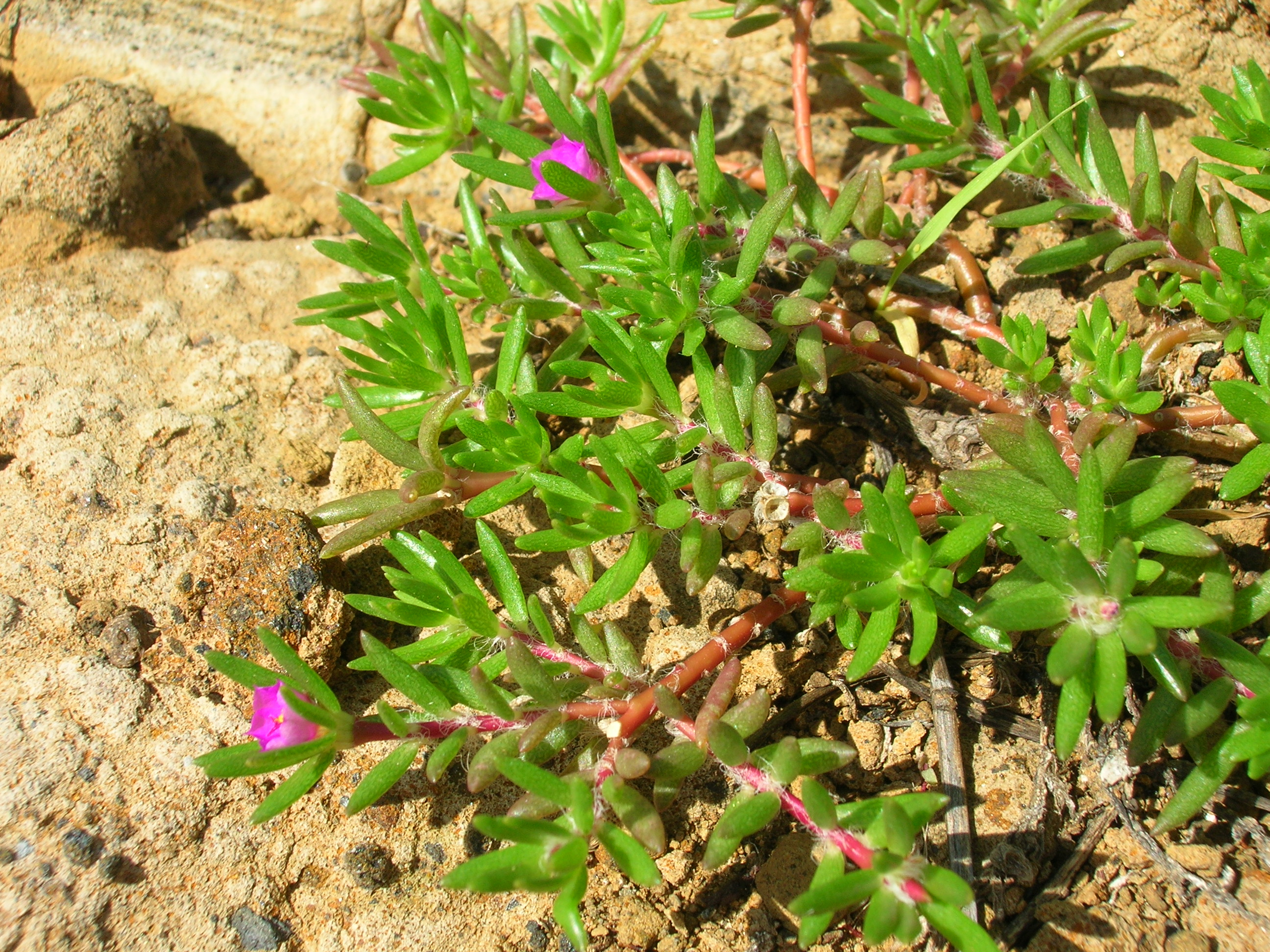

Scientific classification
- Kingdom: Plantae
- Clade: Embryophytes
- Clade: Tracheophytes
- Clade: Angiosperms
- Clade: Eudicots
- Order: Caryophyllales
- Family: Portulacaceae
- Genus: Portulaca
- Species: P. pilosa

Binomial name
- Portulaca pilosa L.

Synonyms
- Portulaca decipiens Poelln.; Portulaca ehrenbergii Poelln.; Portulaca gagatosperma Millsp.; Portulaca karwinskii Fisch. & E. Mey.; Portulaca lanata Rich.; Portulaca mundula I.M. Johnst.; Portulaca poliosperma Urb.; Portulaca procumbens Urb. & Ekman

= Portulaca pilosa =

Species of flowering plant

Portulaca pilosa is a species of flowering succulent plant in the purslane family, Portulacaceae, which is native to the Americas. Its common names include pink purslane, kiss-me-quick, and hairy pigweed. Its range extends from the southern United States and the Caribbean to as far south as Brazil. It is a succulent plant with linear leaves and pink flowers.

== Description ==
The name is derived from pilose, which means to be covered with long soft hairs. Portulaca pilosa is a highly variable species. It exhibits morphological variability during its development. The immature plants have wider, longer and flatter leaves than its mature counterparts. Leaves of mature plants are narrower, shorter and more hemispheric in cross section.

Physical differences are observed due to variable habitat types this species can be found in. Plants that grow in an arid environment tend to have the greatest density of hairs. Plants that grow in a moist environment tend to have less hairs. Plants with very dense hair under a certain condition will produce fewer hair growth under a moist condition, showing growth variability. The plant habit is also governed by its habitat. Plants growing in moist, warm environments tend to branch quickly into a spreading habit, with an erect secondary growth. Plants in dry and cool environments are the opposite, they grow erect first and then branch more slowly. This type has a more compact habit.

Specimens from Alabama, Arizona, Florida, Louisiana, Mississippi, Texas, and New Mexico exhibit all morphologic conditions. Those from Arkansas, Kansas, Missouri, and Oklahoma usually tend to occur in shallow, sandy soils, often on rocky outcrops, and are often highly branched, compact, short, and not very pilose (hairy).

== Distribution ==
Portulaca pilosa is a pantropical species which according to some sources is native to the Americas, and according to others to Asia or even to both. In the Americas P. pilosa can be found in Mexico, West Indies, Central America, and as far south in South America as Brazil; and in the United States, they are typically concentrated in the southern parts such as Arkansas, Texas, New Mexico, Florida, Mississippi among other states. P. pilosa is a documented invasive species throughout the Hawaiian Islands, the Galapagos Islands, New Caledonia, and Christmas Island (PIER.org 2012). In Hawaii, P. pilosa is officially documented from the coastline to dry lava flows at over 610 m in elevation yet can be found up to nearly 1,800 m in the Pohakuloa Saddle region.

In Cuba, Portulaca pilosa is commonly called "Diez de la Mañana", i.e. the 10 a.m. flower. In other Latin countries, it is known as "Flor Diez del Día."

== Characteristics ==
The plants are annual, and the flowering can be from late spring to early fall. They grow and flower year-round in south Florida. This plant is somewhat unusual in that it can grow under a range of different environments, including dry soils, beaches, and disturbed habitats. It also grows on roadsides and railroads, on limestone, granitic, and sandstone outcrops.

== Structures ==
The roots are fibrous to semi-fleshy. The trichomes are rather obvious at the nodes and are in inflorescence. The branch size range from 3-25 centimeters. The leaf blades are linear to oblong-lanceolate, which is intermediate of the two. They can also be terete to hemispheric, with a range of size (5–20 x 1–3 mm). The plant has an acute apex with involucre-like bract of about six to nine. Flowers range from .5 to 1.2 centimeters in diameter. The color of the petals can range from darkish pink to purple. The flower shape is obovate with 3–5 x 1.5–3 millimeters in size. The stamens in size of 5–12 millimeters but can reach up to 37 millimeters. The stigmas can be of the size of between 3–6 millimeters. The capsules are oval with a 1.5 to 4.3 millimeters in diameter. The seeds are black or leaden with a nearly circular shape. The size ranges from .4 to .6 millimeters in diameter. The surface cells are loosely arranged. The number of chromosomes is 16, which is 2n = 8.

== Uses ==
It has been said that the species of Portulaca pilosa in Brazil has been used as a traditional remedy to cause diuresis, antipyresis, and analgesia. Studies have shown that its extracts have renal effects. It has also been seen that, in rats, such extracts cause an increase in potassium excretion without a concomitant change in water diuresis or sodium excretion.
