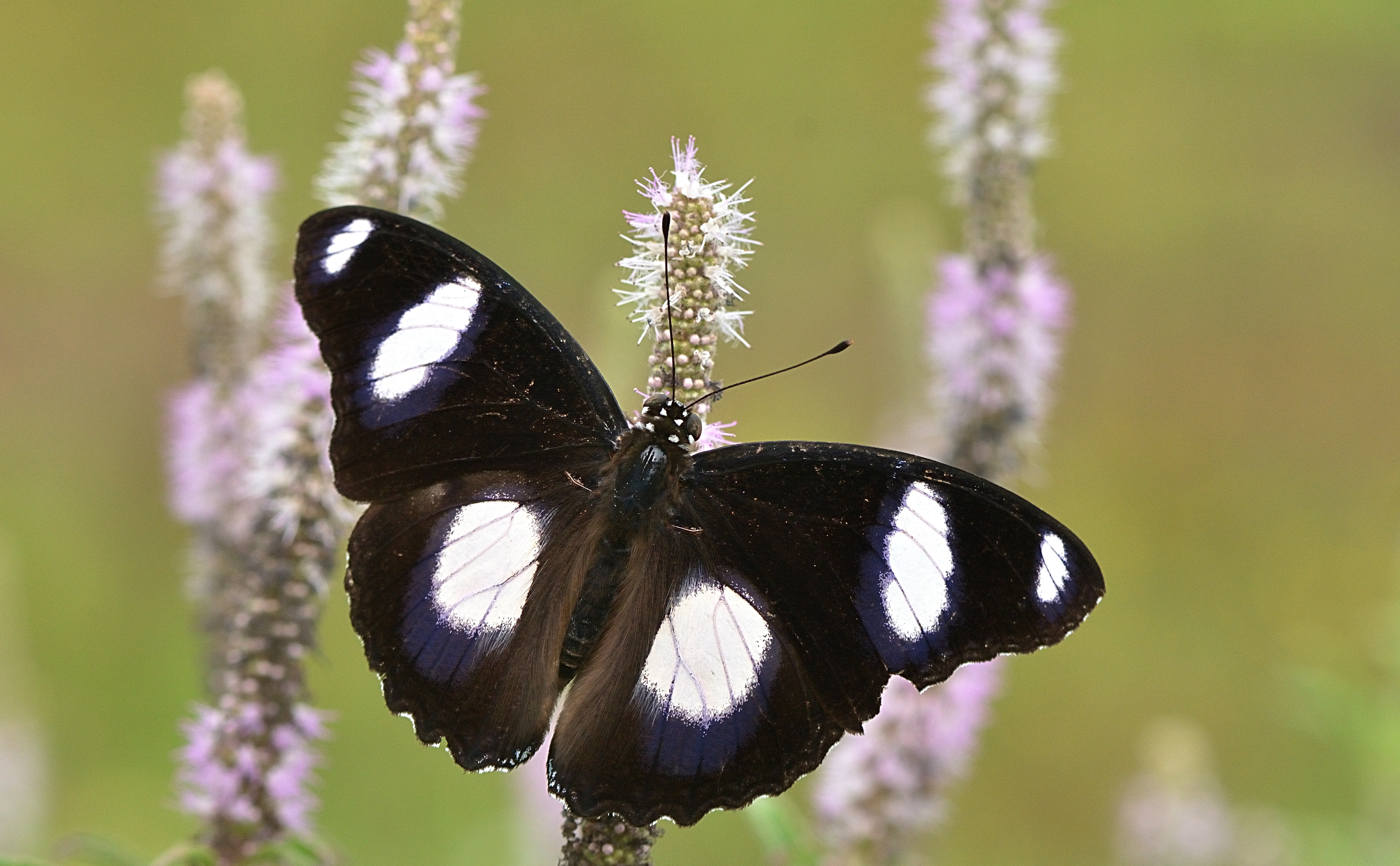
- male, upperside
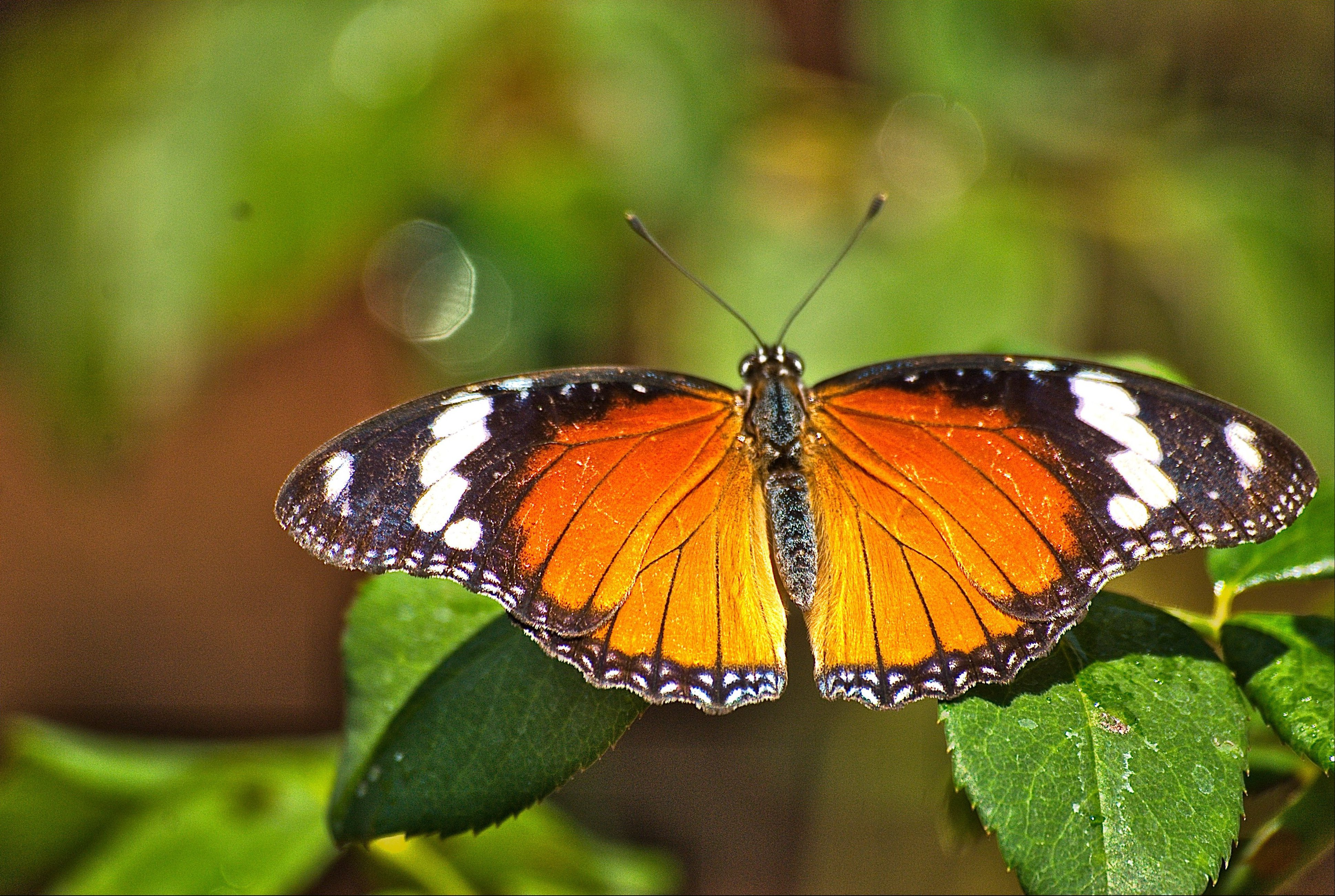
- female, upperside

Conservation status
- Least Concern (IUCN 3.1)

Scientific classification
- Kingdom: Animalia
- Phylum: Arthropoda
- Clade: Pancrustacea
- Class: Insecta
- Order: Lepidoptera
- Family: Nymphalidae
- Genus: Hypolimnas
- Species: H. misippus

Binomial name
- Hypolimnas misippus (Linnaeus, 1764)

Synonyms
- Papilio misippus Linnaeus, 1764; Diadema misippus; Papilio inaria Cramer, 1779; Hypolimnas alcippoides Butler, 1883; Hypolimnas misippus ab. dorippoides Aurivillius, 1899; Hypolimnas misippus f. immima Bernardi, 1959

= Hypolimnas misippus =

Danaid eggfly

Species of butterfly

Hypolimnas misippus, the Danaid eggfly, mimic, or diadem, is a widespread species of nymphalid butterfly. It is well known for polymorphism and mimicry. Males are in a singular form, appearing blackish with distinctive white spots that are fringed in blue. However, females show multiple forms that include male-like forms while others closely resemble the toxic butterflies Danaus chrysippus and Danaus plexippus.

== Distribution ==
They are found across Africa, Asia, and Australia. In the Americas, they are found in the West Indies, with strays in Central and North America.

It is widely distributed across the Indian Ocean islands, including Maldives,Seychelles, and has recorded on multiple islands such as Mahé, Praslin, Aldabra and Cousine.

== Description ==
The adults are on wing during late summer, between March and April. The wing periods are associated with rainfall patterns, as peak abundances occur shortly after rainfall. They are rarely seen during dry weathers. This correlation is due food plants growth rates and suitable conditions for larval growth.

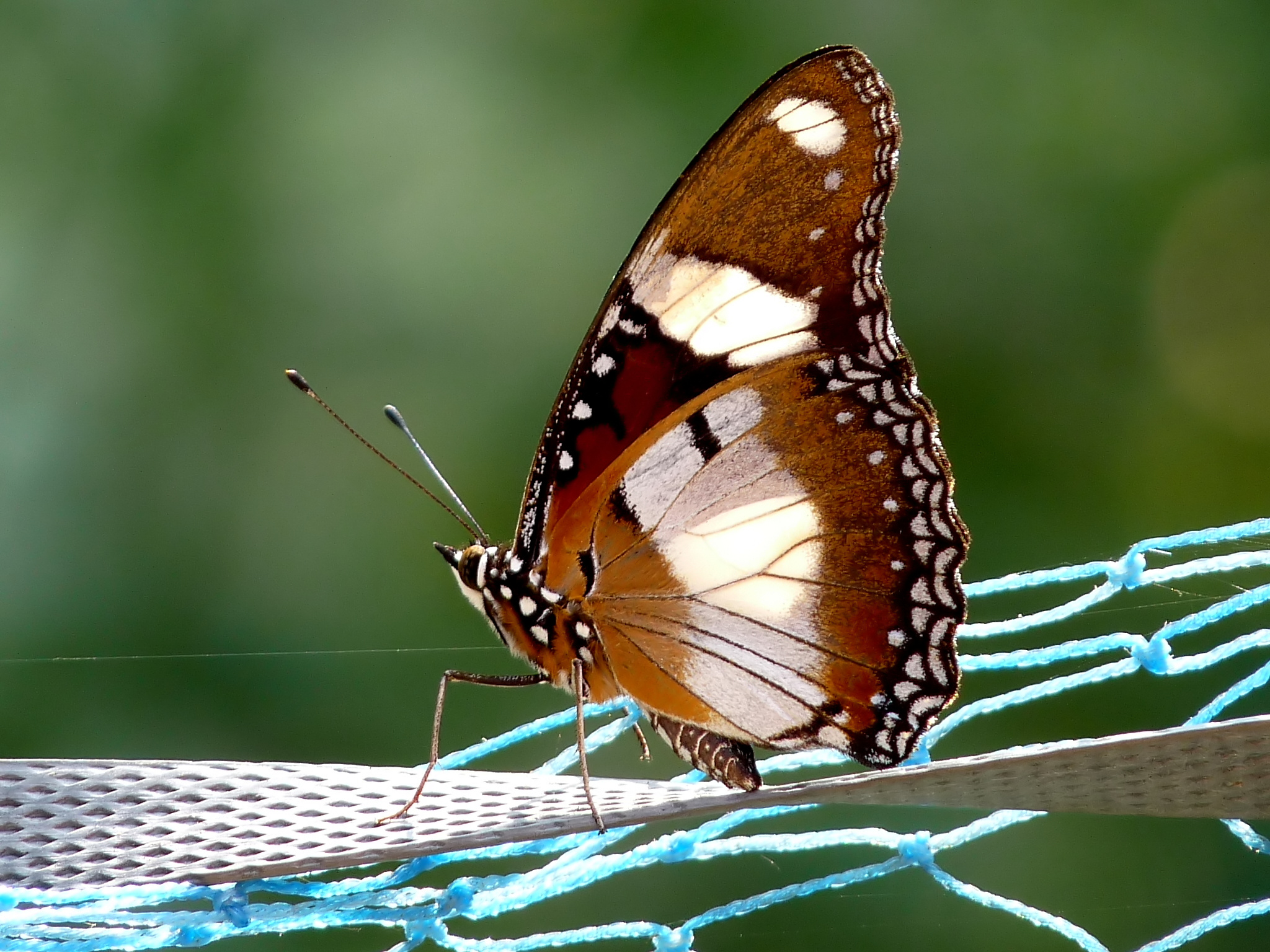
Male underside

=== Male ===
The male is monomorphic, with the upperwings dark velvety brownish black.

Forewing: The forewing has a broad white oval spot between veins 3 and 7. A smaller spot near the apex is also present. These spots are crossed by the black veins and bordered in iridescent blue that is visible only at certain angles. The hindwing has a larger white spot but the veins crossing it are yellowish and not as prominent as on the forewing. There are some white specks along the tornus and the margin is edged with white and black.

The underside of forewing is colored rich light chestnut at the bases of interspaces 1 and 2, and the cell. The discal area, however, shows fuscous brown hue. The apical half is golden brown, with the basal half of costal margin is flecked with white. There are three white spots on th cell, which is black anteriorly. Beyond the apex of the cell, there is a narrow, short, transverse white mark. A broad, oval, white discal patch extends from costa to the middle of interspace 2, edged with a diffused dusky black border. The preapical white spot similar to that on the upperside, lacks the blue outline and continus posteriorly as a transverse series of small postdiscal white spots. Additionally, there is an inner and an outer transverse series of white lunules, separated by a sinuous black line, followed by a terminal black line.

Hindwing: The basal and postdiscal areas are chestnut-red in color. At the base of vein 8, a black spot is present defined by white lines. A very broad medio-discal white band stretches from the costa to the dorsum, intersected at the apex of interspace 1 a by a transverse black mark. Beyond the middle of interspace 7, this band contains a broad black bar, with the interspace itself being bordered inwardly by black. A postdiscal series of small white spots continues from those on the forewing. Additionally, there is an inner subterminal series of paired subtriangular small white spots, followed by an outer subterminal line of slender white lunules. An intervening black sinuous line separates these two series, which builds up into a black terminal line. The cilia present on both of the forewings and hindwings have white, alternated with black coloration. Its antennae, head and thorax, and abdomen are dark brown, while the palpi and thorax are white beneath, and the abdomen is colored chestnut.

The adult males are very active in the late afternoon after rain.

=== Female – polymorphic ===
Phenotypically, multiple distinct type of forms are observed: misippus, alcippoides, dorippoides, immima and inaria, along with an intermediate form between immima and alcippoides, in areas where D. chrysippus is absent. This absence contributes to presence of intermediate forms, due to lack of model species causing variability in mimicry.

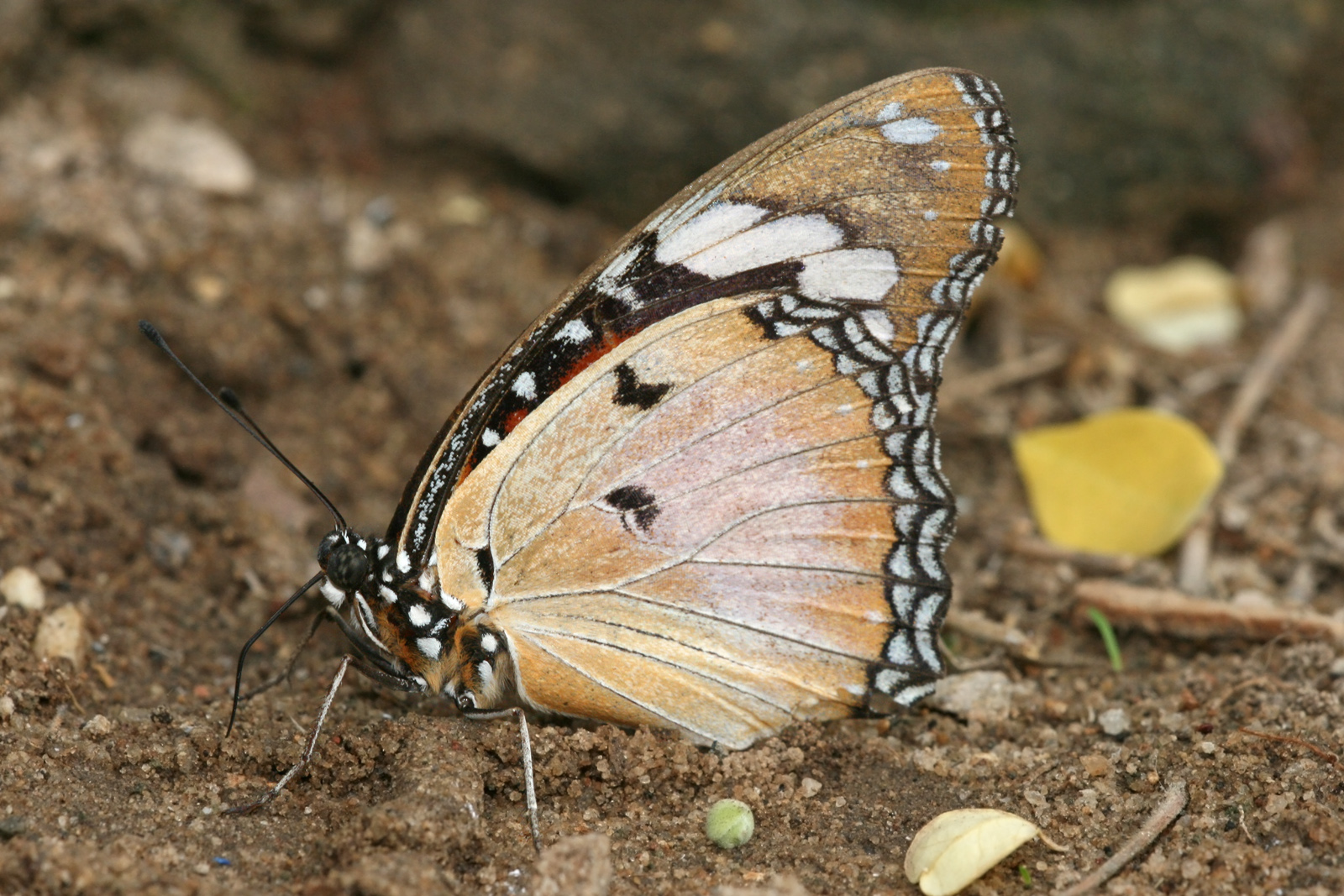
Female, underside

==== First form ====
Forewing: The upperside coloration is rich tawny. The forewing displays black along the costa, the apical half of the wing, and the termen. The inner margin of this black area follows a line crossing the cell obliquely and curving round to near apex of interspace 1a. There is a prominent white spot beyond apex of the cell. The forewing also features an oblique band of more, elongate white spots, accompanied with a more transverse short subapical series of three or four much smaller white spots. An inner and an outer sub-terminal transverse series of very small slender white lunules is also present.

Hindwing: It is characterized by a transverse round spot located in interspace 7, with the terminal margin is notably broadly black. This black margin is traversed by two transverse series of paired small white lunules. The cilia of the forewings and hindwings are white in color, alternated with black. The underside presents a paler tawny-yellow hue, contrasting with deeper tawny coloration of the disc on the forewing. The markings on the underside closely resemble those as on the upperside but differ as follows:

- Forewing: There are three white spots arranged along the anterior margin of cell, while the black area in the apical region, located beyond the oblique band of white spots, is replaced by a prominent golden coloration.
- Hindwing: A black spot is present at the base of vein 8 and another at the base of interspace 5, along with a postdiscal transverse series of small white spots. These markings, in addition to the markings as on the upperside, are distinctive and help in the form identification.

==== Second form ====
The second form of H. misippus is similar to the first, but instead features a white disk on both the upper and underside of the hindwing. This characteristic is specific and indicative of the form referred to as alcippoides (Butler).

==== Third form ====
The third form closely resembles the first, yet it has a variation on the forewing. Specifically, the oblique series of elongate spots appears yellowish, and the central portion of the black apical region consists of a tawny hue.

== Life cycle ==
Larva: According to de la Chaumette (as noted by Moore), the larva of H. misippus has a cylindrical shape and is predominantly black, having an even darker black dorsal line that runs along its back. It is banded transversely with small, pale brown transverse tuberculated spots, contrasting against the dark body. The ventral surface has a dark olive-brown hue, while the legs and head are brick-red in color. The head is equipped with two long, thick branched black spines thats serve as defensive adaptations. The rest of the segments, with the exception of the anal segment, possess a total of ten branched spines that are dirty, transparent white in colour and are disposed in longitudinal rows. The anal segment, notable for its function, also has two similar spines.

Food plant: The larvae primarily feed on the leaves of Portulaca oleracea (common purslane, also known as little hogweed, or pursley), and Asystasia lawiana.

Pupa: The pupa is pendulous in nature, characterized as short and thick, with its overall structure contributing to its camouflage. Its coloration is light brown, lacking any metallic spots, which aids in its concealment among foliage. It is variegated and streaked with bistre, particularly around the head and tail regions, providing further adaptations to the environment. (de la Chaumette.)

== Mimicry ==
The females of H. misippus mimic (in appearance) the similar-sized Danaus chrysippus or the Plain Tiger, a toxic butterfly with the toxic Milkweed as its host plant. The vibrant colours of the Plain Tiger advertise its unpalatable nature to predators around, so the Danaid female sends out the same signal, regardless of it not being toxic. To aid this behaviour, the females also sometimes tend to move with plain tiger butterflies. There are very minute differences in appearance of the two butterflies.

== Larval Host Plants ==
- Amaranthus caudatus
- Asystasia gangetica (Yan Son, 1997)
- Asystasia lawiana
- Barleria cristata
- Blepharis maderaspatensis
- Dyschoriste thunbergiiflora
- Elaeis guineensis
- Justicia betonica
- Ipomoea carnea
- Abelmoschus
- Abutilon
- Hibiscus
- Ruellia cordata
- Ruellia prostrata
- Sida cordifolia
- Vigna radiata
- Plantago asiatica
- Plantago major
- Pseuderanthemum variabile
- Portulaca foliosa
- Portulaca grandiflora
- Portulaca oleracea (Paulian, 1956)
- Portulaca pilosa
- Portulaca quadrifida
- Talinum

== Life Stages ==
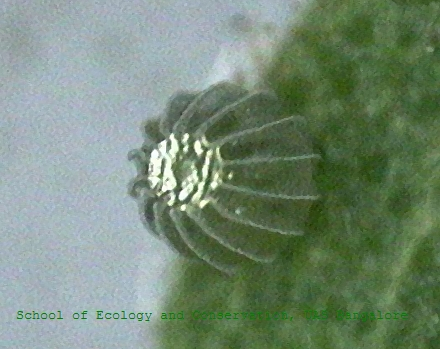
Egg

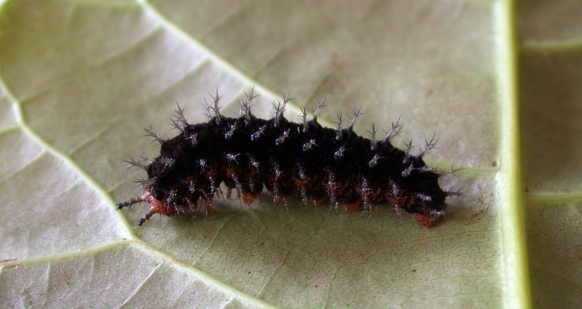
Caterpillar

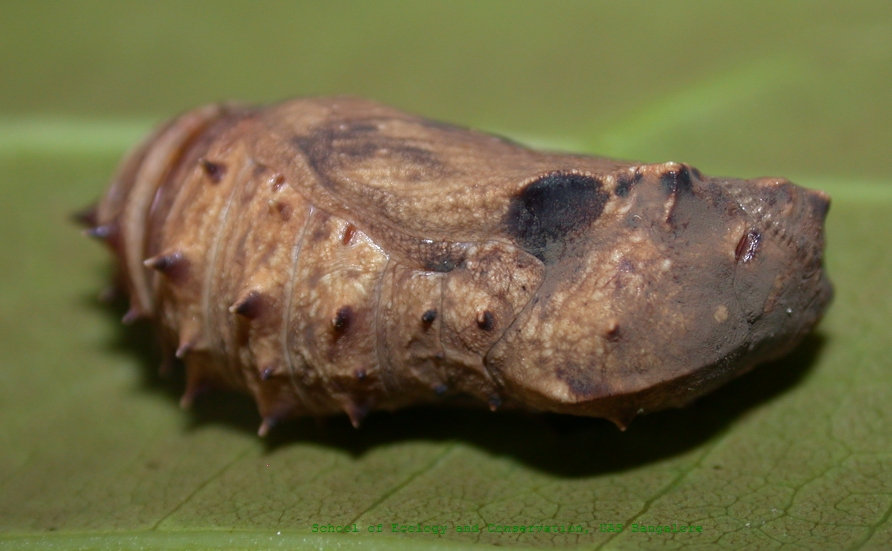
Pupa

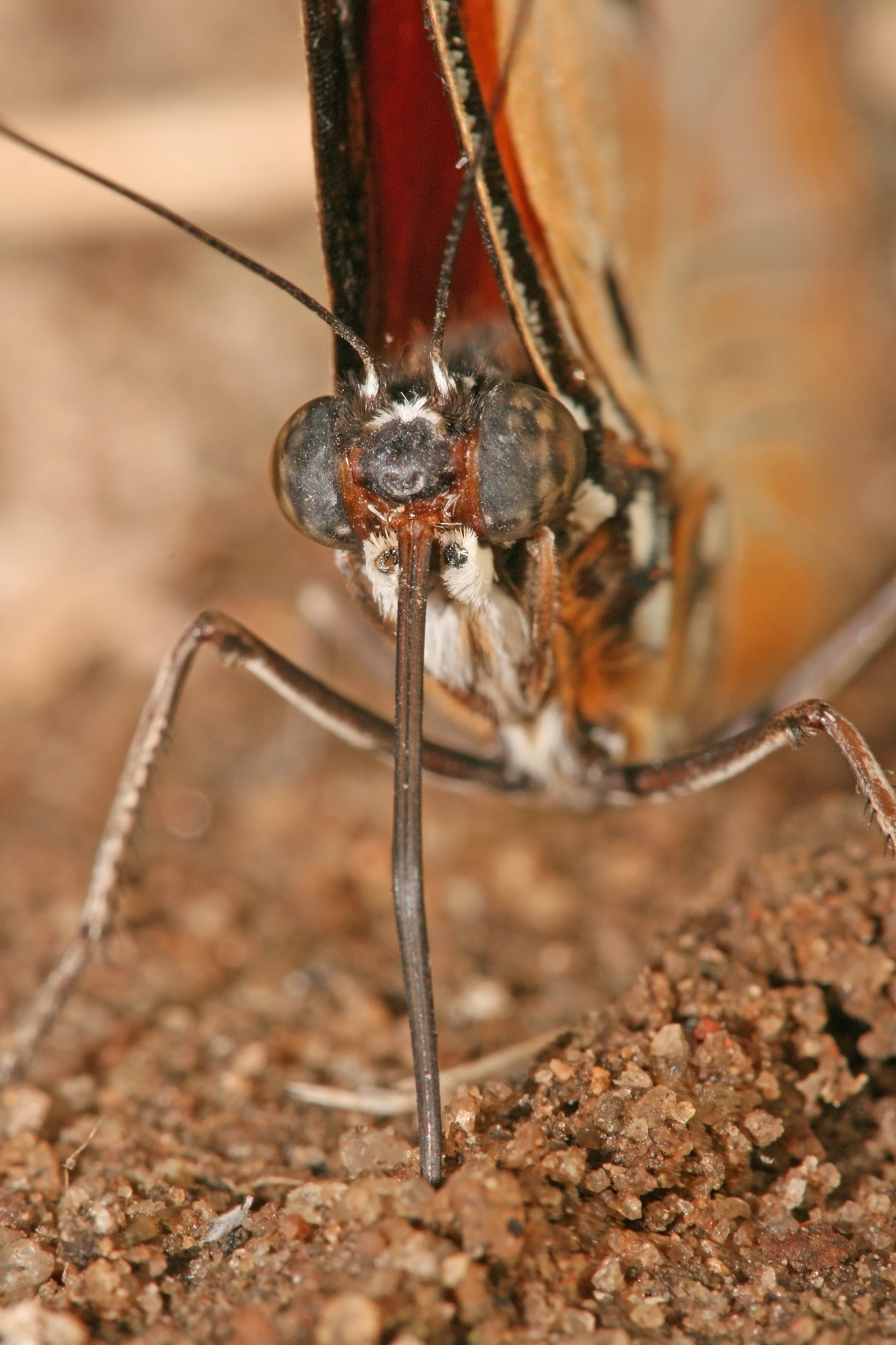
Portrait of the butterfly

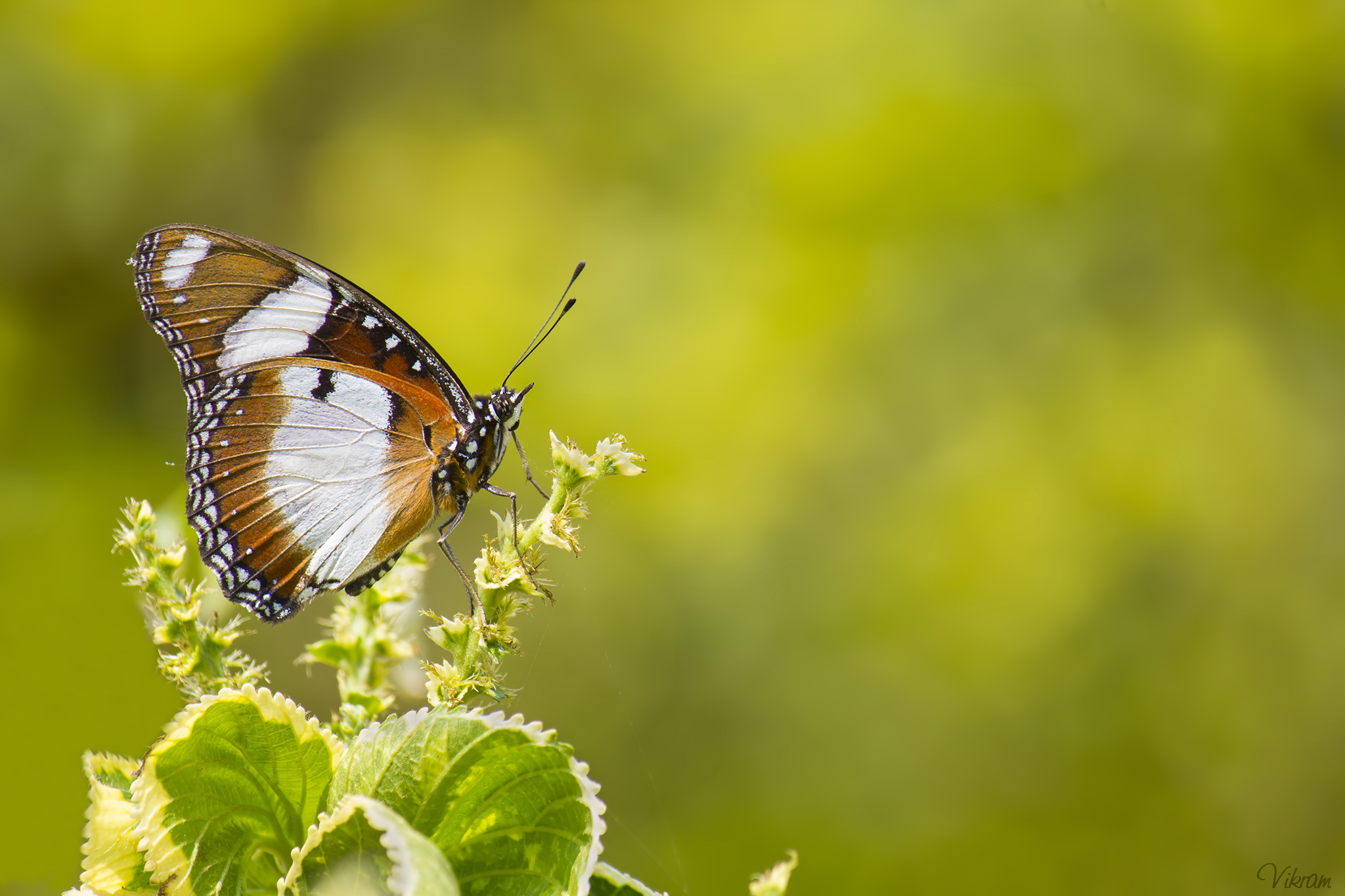
male underside

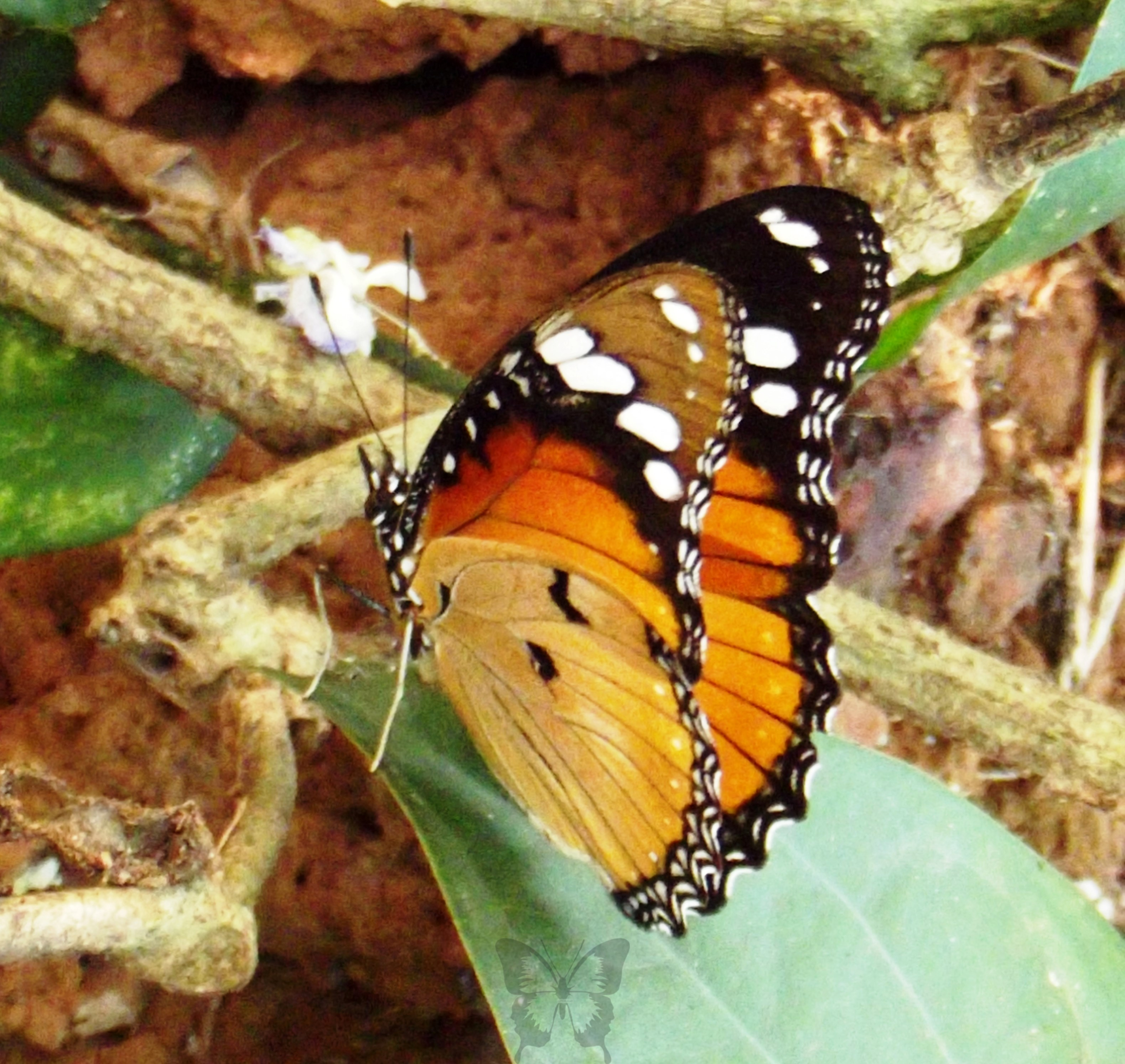
female
