= Ectoedemia aegaeica =

Scientific classification
- Kingdom: Animalia
- Phylum: Arthropoda
- Class: Insecta
- Order: Lepidoptera
- Family: Nepticulidae
- Genus: Ectoedemia
- Species: E. aegaeica

Binomial name
- Ectoedemia aegaeica Z.Laštuvka, A.Laštuvka & Johansson, 1998

Species of moth

Ectoedemia aegaeica is a leaf-mining moth in the family Nepticulidae. It was described in 1998 from specimens collected in mainland Greece and several Aegean Islands, and it appears to be endemic to that region. Adults fly in late spring and early summer and have been taken at light in stands of chaste tree Vitex agnus-castus, the presumed host plant.

== Taxonomy ==
Ectoedemia aegaeica belongs to the genus Ectoedemia and is placed in the subgenus Fomoria. The species was described by Zdeněk Laštůvka, Aleš Laštůvka and Rolf Johansson in 1998 on the basis of external morphology and the structure of the genitalia. The species epithet refers to the Aegean Sea area where all known populations occur. For many years the moth was confused with Ectoedemia groschkei, but it can be distinguished by its smaller size, the more mottled appearance of the forewings, and—most conclusively—the different shape of the male and female genitalia. Robert Hoare's broader review of Fomoria tentatively grouped E. aegaeica with the E. groschkei species complex and reasoned that, like its close relatives, the larva probably mines leaves of the verbena shrub Vitex species.

== Description ==
Adults have a wingspan of 4.0–4.2 mm, making them among the smallest European moths. The head tuft is ochreous-yellow to rust-yellow, and the eye-caps (enlarged scales that partly cover the eyes) are paler, sometimes bearing a few dark scales. The forewings are ochreous densely dusted with black-brown scales; a faint cross-band may be visible just beyond the middle. The hindwings and the fringe are grey, and the sexes are similar in external appearance.

Male genitalia show long, strap-like valvae that are more than twice as long as wide, while the uncus (a leaf-shaped or hooked clasp at the rear of a male moth's genital capsule) is broader and differently curved than that of E. groschkei. The female genital tract bears very wide anal papillae fringed with long setae, and the bursa (a thin-walled pouch in the female that receives and stores the spermatophore) contains a complete ring-shaped signum (a sclerotised plate embedded in the bursa that helps anchor the spermatophore). Such details are important because, in this family of tiny moths, species limits are determined chiefly by genital structure rather than colour pattern.

Larvae mine the leaves of their food plant, feeding between the upper and lower epidermis and creating a narrow serpentine gallery. Although no rearings have yet connected larva to adult with certainty, mines tentatively assigned to E. aegaeica are slightly narrower than those of E. groschkei on the same host. Pupation takes place in a silken cocoon spun on the underside of the leaf outside the mine.

== Habitat and distribution ==
Confirmed records come from Greece, including Laconia and Phthiotis on the mainland and the islands of Rhodes and Crete. The moth seems restricted to warm, low-lying sites influenced by the Aegean Sea, where Mediterranean scrub is interspersed with chaste tree thickets along watercourses and in damp clearings. Adults have been found from mid-May to late June, suggesting a single generation per year, and their presence is closely linked to the distribution of Vitex agnus-castus, which also provides shelter and nectar sources in these habitats.
