= C19H18O8 =

The molecular formula C_{19}H_{18}O_{8} (molar mass: 374.34 g/mol, exact mass: 374.1002 u) may refer to:

- Casticin
- Chrysosplenetin
