= Ribwort =

Ribwort is a common name for several plants and may refer to:

- Plantago asiatica
- Plantago lanceolata
- Plantago major
