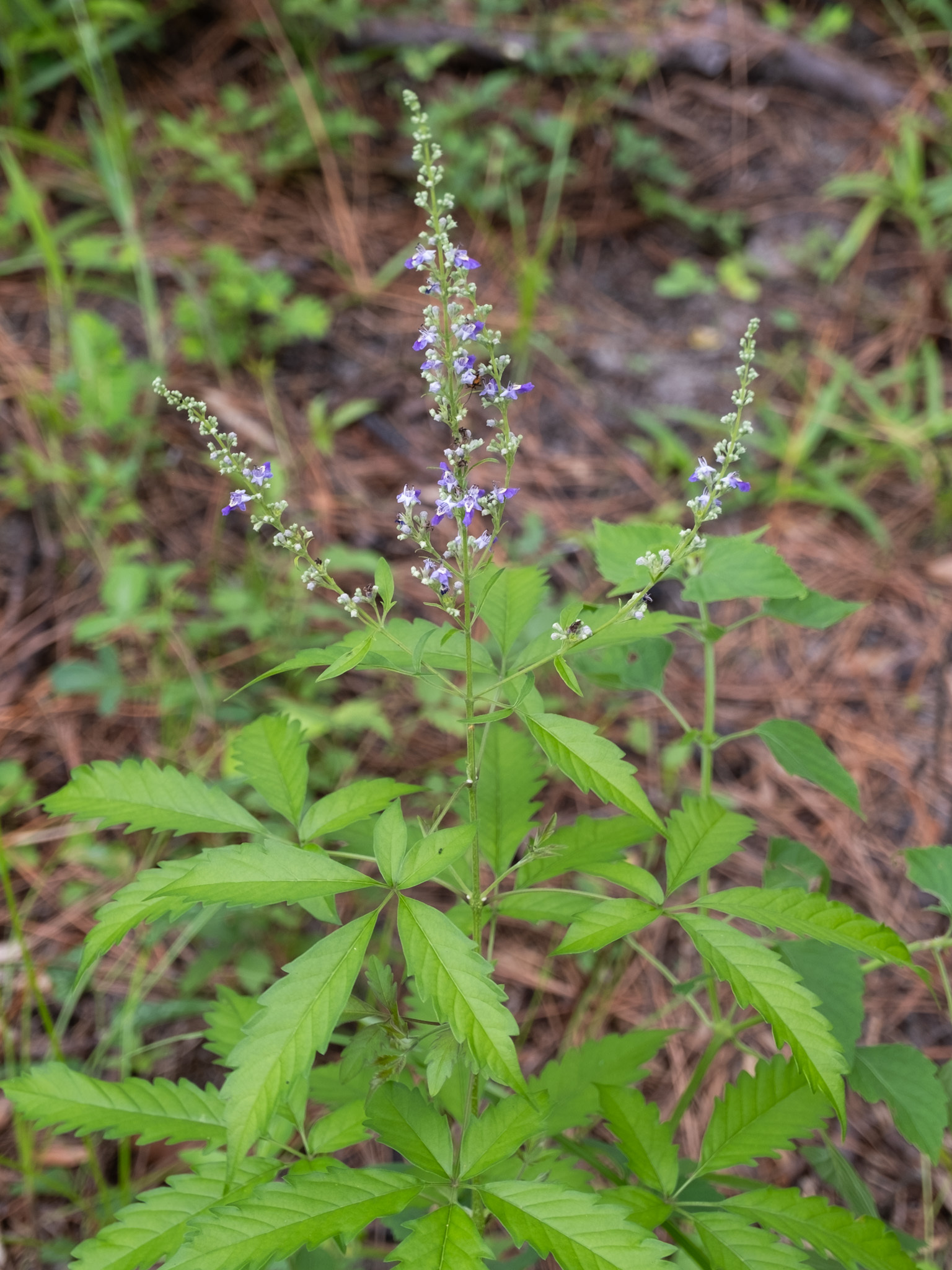

Scientific classification
- Kingdom: Plantae
- Clade: Tracheophytes
- Clade: Angiosperms
- Clade: Eudicots
- Clade: Asterids
- Order: Lamiales
- Family: Lamiaceae
- Genus: Vitex
- Species: V. negundo

Binomial name
- Vitex negundo L.

Synonyms
- Vitex cannabifolia Siebold & Zucc.; Vitex incisa Lam.; Vitex incisa var. heterophylla Franch.; Vitex negundo var. heterophylla (Franch.) Rehder

= Vitex negundo =

Five-leaved chaste tree

Species of flowering plant

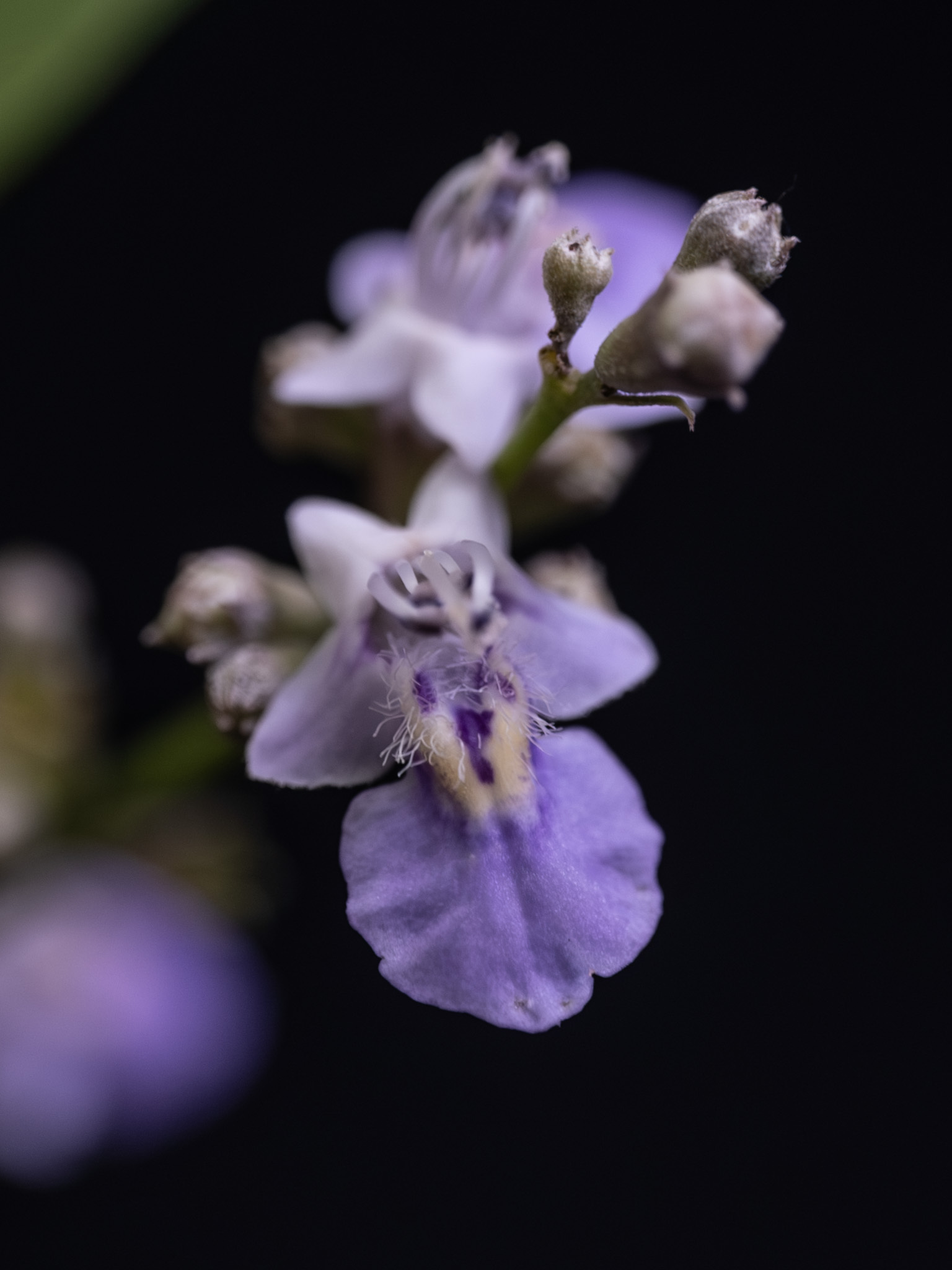
Close-up on flowers

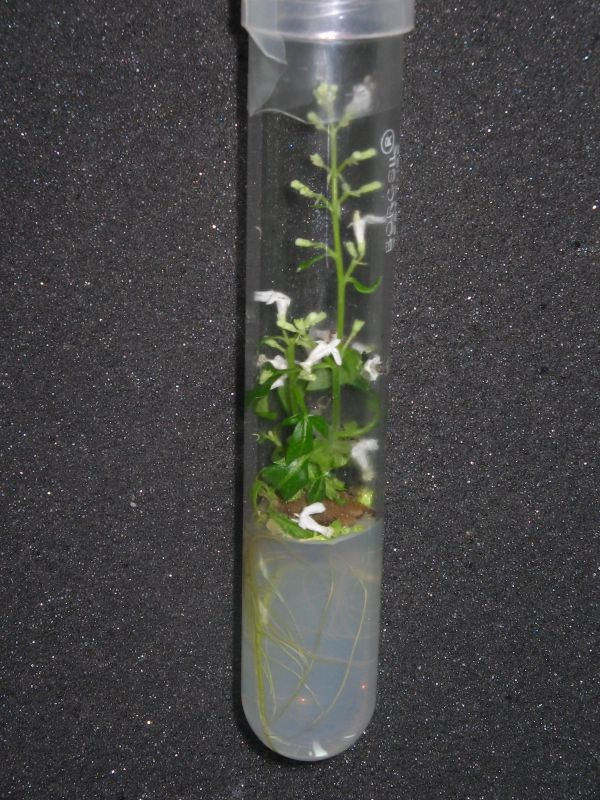
In vitro flowering in Vitex negundo

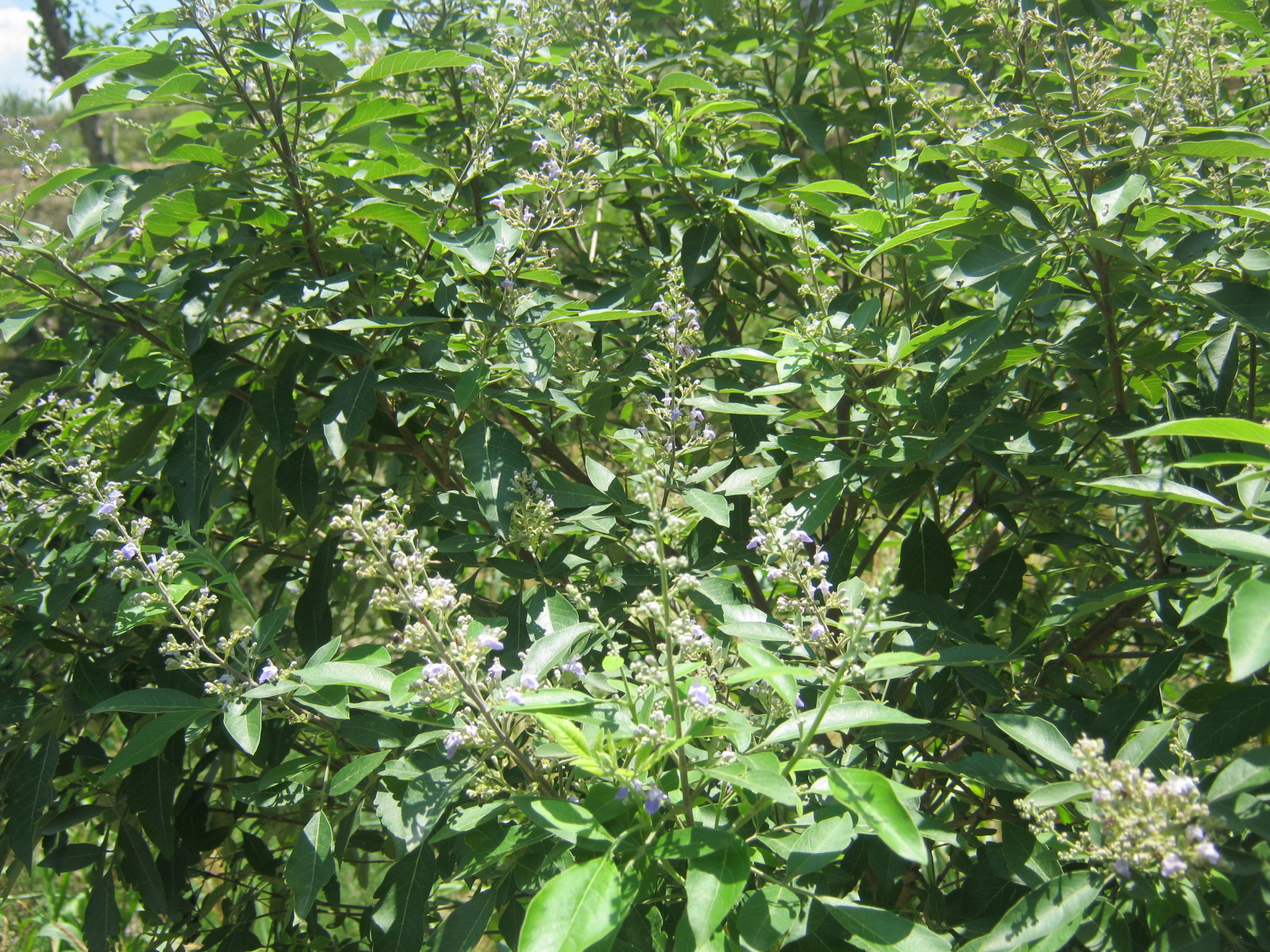
Inflorescence of Vitex negundo in Panchkhal valley in Nepal

Vitex negundo, commonly known as the Chinese chaste tree, five-leaved chaste tree, or horseshoe vitex, or nisinda is a large aromatic shrub with quadrangular, densely whitish, tomentose branchlets. It is widely used in folk medicine, particularly in South and Southeast Asia.

Vitex negundo is an erect shrub or small tree growing from 2 to 8 m (6.6 to 26.2 ft) in height. The bark is reddish brown. Its leaves are digitate, with five lanceolate leaflets, sometimes three. Each leaflet is around 4 to 10 cm (1.6 to 3.9 in) in length, with the central leaflet being the largest and possessing a stalk. The leaf edges are toothed or serrated and the bottom surface is covered in hair. The numerous flowers are borne in panicles 10 to 20 cm (3.9 to 7.9 in) in length. Each is around 6 to 7 cm (2.4 to 2.8 in) long and are white to blue in color. The petals are of different lengths, with the middle lower lobe being the longest. Both the corolla and calyx are covered in dense hairs.

The fruit is a succulent drupe, 4 mm (0.16 in) in diameter, rounded to egg-shaped. It is black or purple when ripe.

== Distribution and habitat ==
Vitex negundo is native to tropical Eastern and Southern Africa and Asia. It is widely cultivated and naturalized elsewhere.

Countries it is indigenous to include Afghanistan, Bangladesh, Bhutan, Cambodia, China, India, Indonesia, Japan, Korea, Kenya, Madagascar, Malaysia, Mozambique, Myanmar, Nepal, Pakistan, the Philippines, Sri Lanka, Taiwan, Tanzania, Thailand, and Vietnam.

Vitex negundo are commonly found near bodies of water, recently disturbed land, grasslands, and mixed open forests.

== Nomenclature ==
Common names of Vitex negunda in different languages include:

- Assamese: Posotiya (পচতীয়া)
- Bengali: Nirgundi; Nishinda; Samalu
- Bontok: Liñgei
- Chinese: Huáng jīng (黄荆)
- English: Five-leaved chaste tree; Horseshoe vitex; Chinese chaste tree
- Filipino: Lagundî
- Gujarati: Nagoda; Shamalic
- Hindi: Mewri; Nirgundi; Nisinda; Sambhalu; Sawbhalu (निर्गुंडी)
- Ifugao: Dabtan
- Ilokano: Dangla
- Kannada: Biḷi nekki (ಬಿಳಿ ನೆಕ್ಕಿ)
- Korean: jommokhyeong (좀목형)
- Malayalam: Karinochi (കരിനൊച്ചി)
- Marathi: Nirgudi (निरगुडी)
- Nepali: 'सिमली' 'Simali' 'Nirgundi'
- Punjabi: Banna; Marwan; Maura; Mawa; Swanjan Torbanna
- Sanskrit: Nirgundi; Sephalika; Sindhuvara; Svetasurasa; Vrikshaha (सिन्धुवार)
- Sinhala: Nika (නික)
- Konkani: Lingad
- Tamil: Chinduvaram; Nirnochchi; Nochchi; Notchi; Vellai-nochchi (நொச்சி / கரு நொச்சி)
- Telugu: Sindhuvara; Vavili; Nalla-vavili; Tella-vavili (వావిలి / సింధువార) lekkali
- Urdu: Sumbaloo
- Odia: Begunia

== Chemistry ==
The principal constituents of the leaf juice are casticin, isoorientin, chrysophenol D, luteolin, p–hydroxybenzoic acid and D-fructose. The main constituents of the oil are sabinene, linalool, terpinen-4-ol, β-caryophyllene, α-guaiene and globulol constituting 61.8% of the oil.

== Uses ==
Purified extracts are believed to have medicinal properties.

Vitex negundo is used for treating stored garlic against pests. It is also listed as one of the ten herbal medicine approved by the Department of Health as a cough remedy in the Philippines, and sold under the trade names Ascof, Plemex, and Lagundex. In Malaysia, it is used in traditional herbal medicine for women's health, including treatments for regulating the menstrual cycle, fibrocystic breast disease and post-partum remedies.
