= Aucubin =

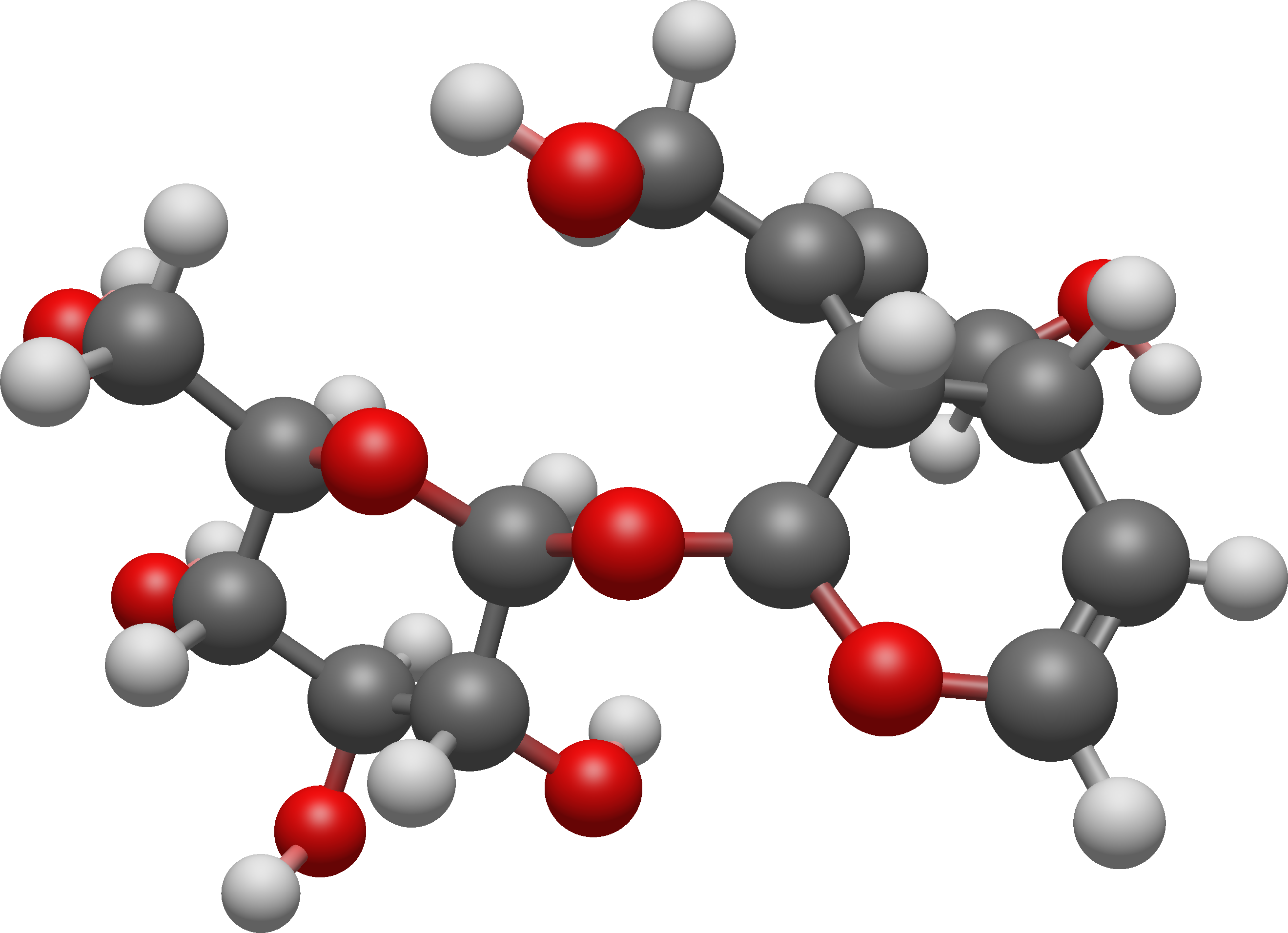

Names
- IUPAC name (1S,4aR,5S,7aS)-5-Hydroxy-7-(hydroxymethyl)-1,4a,5,7a-tetrahydrocyclopenta[c]pyran-1-yl β-D-glucopyranoside
- Systematic IUPAC name (2S,3R,4S,5S,6R)-2-{[(1S,4aR,5S,7aS)-5-Hydroxy-7-(hydroxymethyl)-1,4a,5,7a-tetrahydrocyclopenta[c]pyran-1-yl]oxy}-6-(hydroxymethyl)oxane-3,4,5-triol
- Other names Aucubin

Identifiers
CAS Number	479-98-1
3D model (JSmol)	Interactive image
Beilstein Reference	50340
ChEMBL	ChEMBL514882
ChemSpider	82585
ECHA InfoCard	100.006.856
EC Number	207-540-8
KEGG	C09771
PubChem CID	91458
UNII	2G52GS8UML
CompTox Dashboard (EPA)	DTXSID60963965
- InChI: InChI=1S/C15H22O9/c16-4-6-3-8(18)7-1-2-22-14(10(6)7)24-15-13(21)12(20)11(19)9(5-17)23-15/h1-3,7-21H,4-5H2/t7-,8+,9+,10+,11+,12-,13+,14-,15-/m0/s1 Key: RJWJHRPNHPHBRN-FKVJWERZSA-N; InChI=1/C15H22O9/c16-4-6-3-8(18)7-1-2-22-14(10(6)7)24-15-13(21)12(20)11(19)9(5-17)23-15/h1-3,7-21H,4-5H2/t7-,8+,9+,10+,11+,12-,13+,14-,15-/m0/s1 Key: RJWJHRPNHPHBRN-FKVJWERZBS
- SMILES: O2\C=C/[C@@H]1[C@@H](C(=C/[C@H]1O)\CO)[C@@H]2O[C@@H]3O[C@@H]([C@@H](O)[C@H](O)[C@H]3O)CO

Properties
Chemical formula	C_{15}H_{22}O_{9}
Molar mass	346.332 g·mol^{−1}
- Except where otherwise noted, data are given for materials in their standard state (at 25 °C [77 °F], 100 kPa). verify (what is ?) Infobox references

Aucubin is an iridoid glycoside. Iridoids are commonly found in plants and function as defensive compounds. Iridoids decrease the growth rates of many generalist herbivores.

== Natural occurrences ==
Aucubin, as other iridoids, is found in asterids such as Aucuba japonica (Garryaceae), Eucommia ulmoides (Eucommiaceae), Plantago asiatica, Plantago major, Plantago lanceolata (Plantaginaceae), Galium aparine (Rubiaceae), Euphrasia brevipila and others. These plants are used in traditional Chinese and folk medicine.

Agnuside is composed of aucubin and p-hydroxybenzoic acid.

== Health effects ==
Aucubin was found to protect against liver damage induced by carbon tetrachloride or alpha-amanitin in mice and rats when 80 mg/kg was dosed intraperitoneally.

== Chemistry ==
Aucubin is a monoterpenoid based compound. Aucubin, like all iridoids, has a cyclopentan-[C]-pyran skeleton. Iridoids can consist of ten, nine, or rarely eight carbons in which C11 is more frequently missing than C10. Aucubin has 10 carbons with the C11 carbon missing. The stereochemical configurations at C5 and C9 lead to cis fused rings, which are common to all iridoids containing carbocyclic- or seco-skeleton in non-rearranged form. Oxidative cleavage at C7-C8 bond affords secoiridoids. The last steps in the biosynthesis of iridoids usually consist of O-glycosylation and O-alkylation. Aucubin, a glycoside iridoid, has an O-linked glucose moiety.

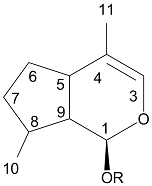

== Biosynthesis ==
Geranyl pyrophosphate (GPP) is the precursor for iridoids. Geranyl phosphate is generated through the mevalonate pathway or the methylerythritol phosphate pathway. The initial steps of the pathway involve the fusion of three molecules of acetyl-CoA to produce the C6 compound 3-hydroxy-3-methylglutaryl-CoA (HMG-CoA). HMG-CoA is then reduced in two steps by the enzyme HMG-CoA reductase. The resulting mevalonate is then sequentially phosphorylated by two separate kinases, mevalonate kinase and phosphomevalonate kinase, to form 5-pyrophosphomevalonate. Phosphosphomevalonate decarboxylase through a concerted decarboxylation reaction affords isopentenyl pyrophosphate (IPP). IPP is the basic C5 building block that is added to prenyl phosphate cosubstrates to form longer chains. IPP is isomerized to the allylic ester dimethylallyl pyrophosphate (DMAPP) by IPP isomerase. Through a multi-step process, including the dephosphorylation DMAPP, IPP and DMAPP are combined to form the C10 compound geranyl pyrophosphate (GPP). Geranyl pyrophosphate is a major branch point for terpenoid synthesis.

Current biosynthesis studies suggest that the most probable synthetic sequence from 10-hydroxygerinol to 8-epi-iriotrial is the following: dephosphorylation of GPP, leads to a geranyl cation that is then hydroxylated to form 10-hydroxygeraniol; 10-hydroxylgeraniol is isomerized to 10-hydroxynerol; 10-hydroxynerol is oxidized using NAD to form a trialdehyde; finally the trialdehyde undergoes a double Michael addition to yield 8-epi-iridotrial. 8-Epi-iridotrial is another branch point intermediate.

The cyclization reaction to form the iridoid pyran ring may result from one of two routes:

1. route 1 – a hydride nucleophillic attack on C1 will lead to 1-O-carbonyl atom attack on C3, yielding the lactone ring;
2. route 2 – loss of proton from carbon 4 leads to the formation of a double bond C3-C4; consequently the 3-O-carbonyl atom will attach to C1.

Based on deuterium tracking studies, the biosynthetic pathway for aucubin from the cyclized lactone intermediate is organism specific. In Gardenia jasminoides, the cyclized lactone intermediate is glycosylated to form boschnaloside that is then hydroxylated on C10; boschnaloside is oxidized to geniposidic acid; geniposidic acid is then decarboxylated to form bartisioside; bartisioside is then hydroxylated to form aucubin. The Scrophularia umbrosa biosynthetic pathway is different from Gardenia jasminoides. In Scrophularia umbrosa, the lactone intermediate is glycosylated and oxidized at the C11 carbonyl to form 8-epi-dexoy-loganic acid, which is then converted to deoxygeniposidic acid; deoxygeniposidic acid is hydroxylated at C10 to geniposidic acid; decarboxylation and hydroxylation of C6 leads to aucubin.

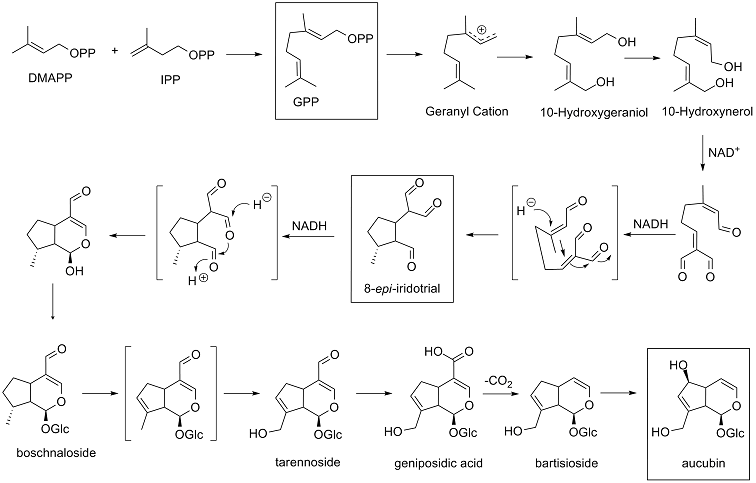
