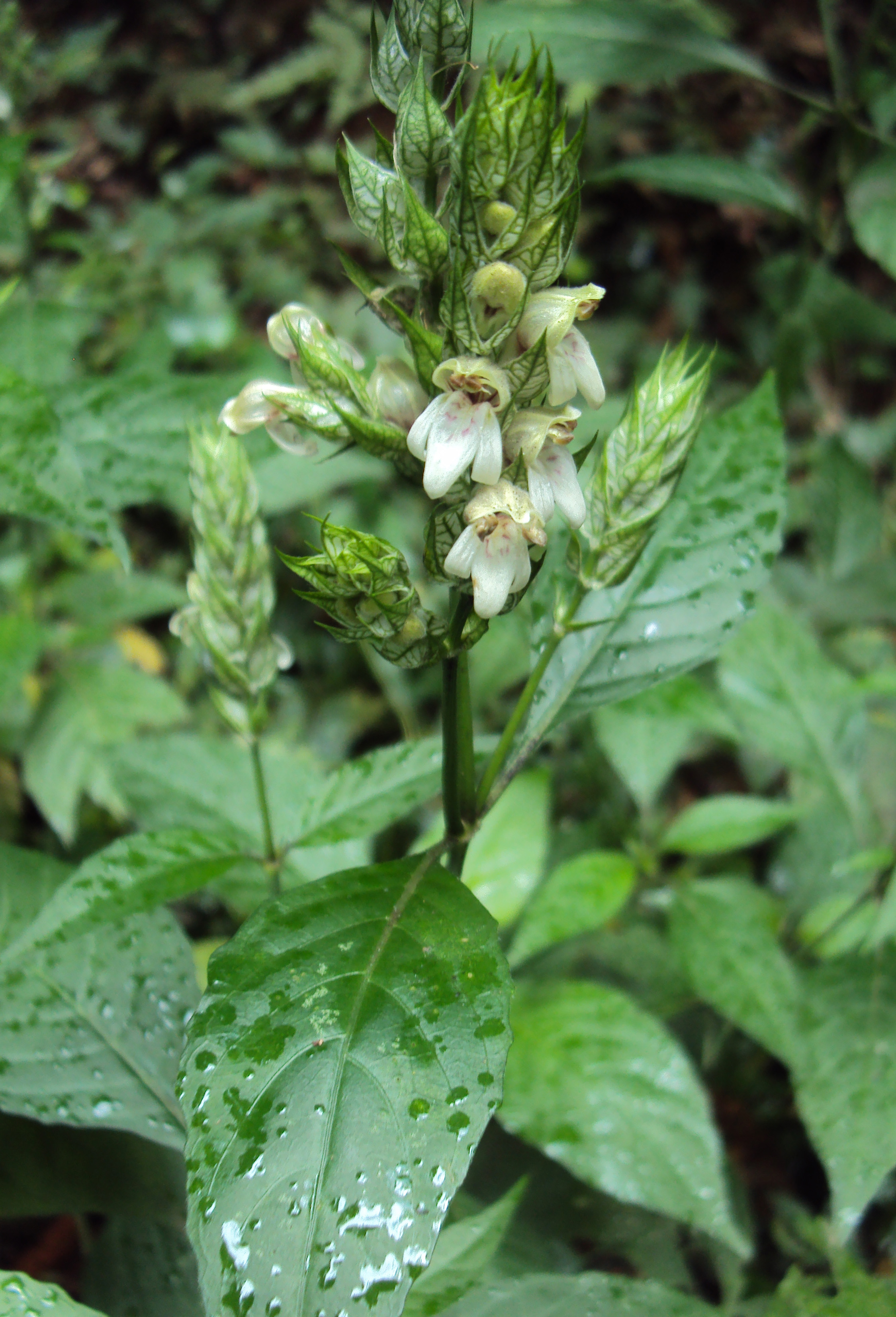
- Nicoteba betonica

Scientific classification
- Kingdom: Plantae
- Clade: Tracheophytes
- Clade: Angiosperms
- Clade: Eudicots
- Clade: Asterids
- Order: Lamiales
- Family: Acanthaceae
- Genus: Nicoteba; Lindau (1893)

Species
- Nicoteba betonica (L.) Lindau; Nicoteba fittonioides (S.Moore) Lindau; Nicoteba nilgherrensis (Nees) Lindau; Nicoteba versicolor Lindau

= Nicoteba =

Genus of flowering plants

Nicoteba is a genus of flowering plants in the family Acanthaceae. It includes four species native to sub-Saharan Africa and the Indian subcontinent.

== Species ==
Four species are accepted.

- Nicoteba betonica (L.) Lindau – western, eastern, and southern tropical Africa and the Indian subcontinent (India, Bangladesh, and Sri Lanka)
- Nicoteba fittonioides (S.Moore) Lindau – southeastern Kenya, Tanzania, and northern Mozambique
- Nicoteba nilgherrensis (Nees) Lindau – southwestern India
- Nicoteba versicolor Lindau – Angola
