= Agnuside =

Names
- IUPAC name [(1S,4aR,5S,7aS)-1-(β-D-Glucopyranosyloxy)-5-hydroxy-1,4a,5,7a-tetrahydrocyclopenta[c]pyran-7-yl]methyl 4-hydroxybenzoate
- Systematic IUPAC name [(1S,4aR,5S,7aS)-5-Hydroxy-1-{[(2S,3R,4S,5S,6R)-3,4,5-trihydroxy-6-(hydroxymethyl)oxan-2-yl]oxy}-1,4a,5,7a-tetrahydrocyclopenta[c]pyran-7-yl]methyl 4-hydroxybenzoate

Identifiers
CAS Number	11027-63-7
3D model (JSmol)	Interactive image
ChEBI	CHEBI:2515
ChemSpider	390857
ECHA InfoCard	100.208.702
KEGG	C09765
PubChem CID	442416
UNII	JB24Q0OT9G
CompTox Dashboard (EPA)	DTXSID10149191
- InChI: InChI=1S/C22H26O11/c23-8-15-17(26)18(27)19(28)22(32-15)33-21-16-11(7-14(25)13(16)5-6-30-21)9-31-20(29)10-1-3-12(24)4-2-10/h1-7,13-19,21-28H,8-9H2/t13-,14+,15+,16+,17+,18-,19+,21-,22-/m0/s1 Key: GLACGTLACKLUJX-QNAXTHAFSA-N; InChI=1/C22H26O11/c23-8-15-17(26)18(27)19(28)22(32-15)33-21-16-11(7-14(25)13(16)5-6-30-21)9-31-20(29)10-1-3-12(24)4-2-10/h1-7,13-19,21-28H,8-9H2/t13-,14+,15+,16+,17+,18-,19+,21-,22-/m0/s1 Key: GLACGTLACKLUJX-QNAXTHAFBH
- SMILES: C1=CO[C@H]([C@H]2[C@@H]1[C@@H](C=C2COC(=O)C3=CC=C(C=C3)O)O)O[C@H]4[C@@H]([C@H]([C@@H]([C@H](O4)CO)O)O)O

Properties
Chemical formula	C_{22}H_{26}O_{11}
Molar mass	466.439 g·mol^{−1}
- Except where otherwise noted, data are given for materials in their standard state (at 25 °C [77 °F], 100 kPa). Infobox references

Agnuside is a chemical compound found in Vitex agnus-castus. Agnuside is the ester of aucubin and p-hydroxybenzoic acid.
