= Ectoedemia groschkei =

Scientific classification
- Kingdom: Animalia
- Phylum: Arthropoda
- Class: Insecta
- Order: Lepidoptera
- Family: Nepticulidae
- Genus: Ectoedemia
- Species: E. groschkei

Binomial name
- Ectoedemia groschkei (Skala, 1943)

Synonyms
- Nepticula groschkei Skala, 1943; Fomoria groschkei (Skala, 1943)

Species of moth

Ectoedemia groschkei is a moth of the family Nepticulidae. It is found in the eastern Mediterranean Region.

There are three generations per year.

The larvae feed on Vitex agnus-castus. They mine the leaves of their host plant.
