= Chrysosplenetin =

- Chemical structure of chrysosplenetin

Names
- IUPAC name 4′,5-Dihydroxy-3,3′,6,7-tetramethoxyflavone
- Systematic IUPAC name 5-Hydroxy-4-(4-hydroxy-3-methoxyphenyl)-3,6,7-trimethoxy-4H-1-benzopyran-4-one
- Other names Chrysosplenetin B 3,6,7,3'-Tetra-methylquercetagetin; Quercetagetin 3,6,7,3'-tetramethyl ether

Identifiers
CAS Number	69234-29-3; 603-56-5
3D model (JSmol)	Interactive image
ChemSpider	4444927
PubChem CID	5281608
UNII	9AA5Z8PMYE
CompTox Dashboard (EPA)	DTXSID80975707
- InChI: InChI=1S/C19H18O8/c1-23-11-7-9(5-6-10(11)20)17-19(26-4)16(22)14-12(27-17)8-13(24-2)18(25-3)15(14)21/h5-8,20-21H,1-4H3 Key: NBVTYGIYKCPHQN-UHFFFAOYSA-N; InChI=1/C19H18O8/c1-23-11-7-9(5-6-10(11)20)17-19(26-4)16(22)14-12(27-17)8-13(24-2)18(25-3)15(14)21/h5-8,20-21H,1-4H3 Key: NBVTYGIYKCPHQN-UHFFFAOYAO
- SMILES: O=C1c3c(O)c(OC)c(OC)cc3O/C(=C1/OC)c2ccc(O)c(OC)c2

Properties
Chemical formula	C_{19}H_{18}O_{8}
Molar mass	374.345 g·mol^{−1}
Density	1.448 g/mL
- Except where otherwise noted, data are given for materials in their standard state (at 25 °C [77 °F], 100 kPa). verify (what is ?) Infobox references

Chrysosplenetin is an O-methylated flavonol. It can be found in the root of Berneuxia thibetica and in Chamomilla recutita.
