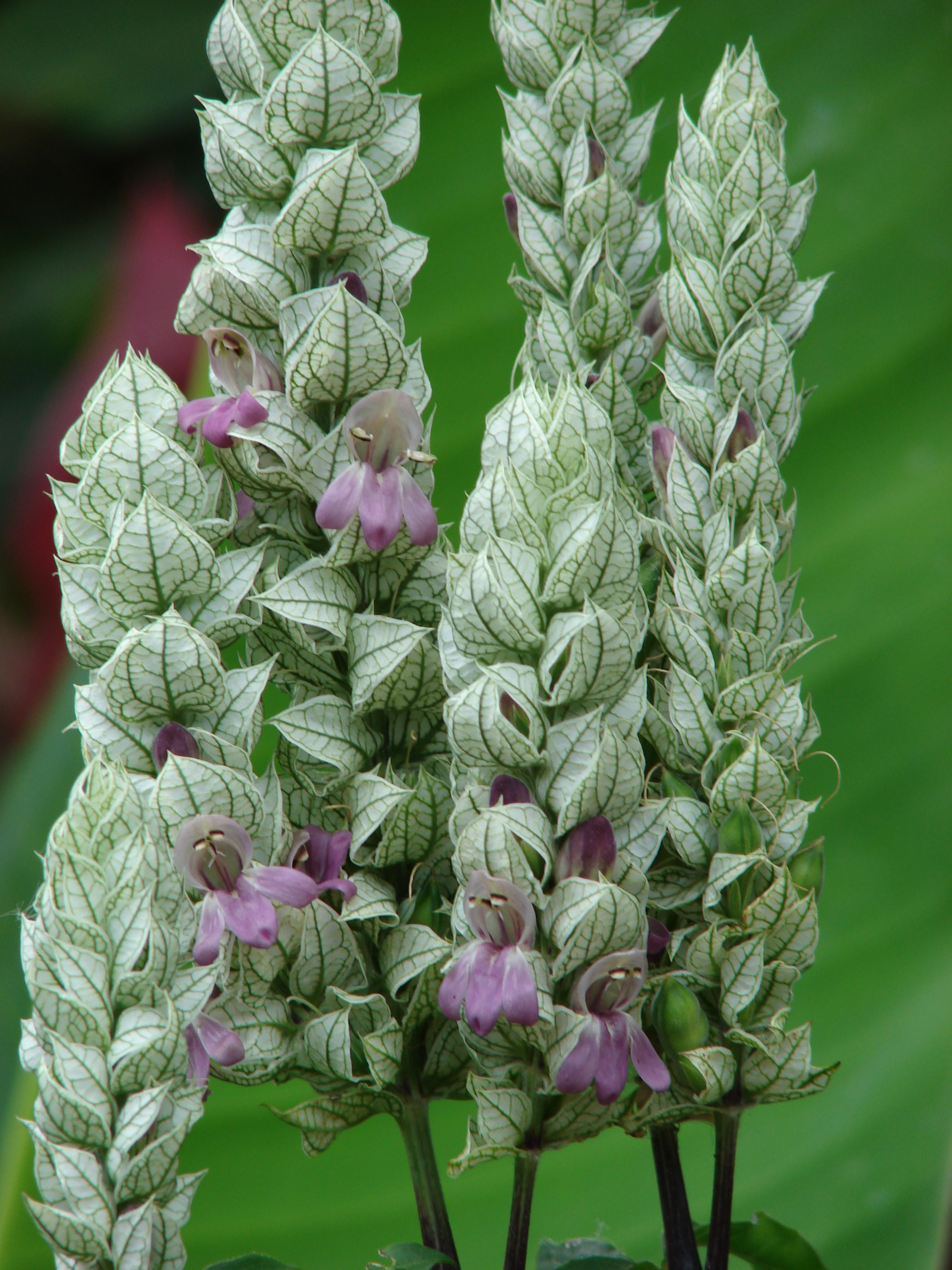

Scientific classification
- Kingdom: Plantae
- Clade: Tracheophytes
- Clade: Angiosperms
- Clade: Eudicots
- Clade: Asterids
- Order: Lamiales
- Family: Acanthaceae
- Genus: Nicoteba
- Species: N. betonica

Binomial name
- Nicoteba betonica (L.) Lindau (1893)

Synonyms
- Adhatoda arenaria Nees (1832); Adhatoda betonica (L.) Nees (1832); Adhatoda cheiranthifolia Nees (1847); Adhatoda lupulina (E.Mey.) Nees (1847); Adhatoda ramosissima (Roxb.) Nees (1832); Adhatoda variegata Nees (1847); Adhatoda variegata var. pallidior Nees (1847); Betonica frutescens Bontekoe; Dicliptera lupulina C.Presl (1845); Ecbolium betonica (L.) Kuntze (1891); Gendarussa arenaria Steud. (1840); Gendarussa betonica Nees ex Steud. (1840), not validly publ.; Gendarussa ramosissima (Roxb. ex Hornem.) Steud. (1840); Gendarussa trinervia Nees ex Steud. (1840); Gendarussa variegata Hochst. ex Nees (1847); Justicia antidota Sm. ex T.Anderson (1863); Justicia betonica L. (1753); Justicia betonicifolia Nees (1847); Justicia cheiranthifolia (Nees) C.B.Clarke (1901); Justicia lupulina E.Mey. (1843); Justicia pallidior (Nees) C.B.Clarke (1901); Justicia pallidior var. cooperi C.B.Clarke (1901); Justicia pseudobetonica Roth (1817); Justicia ramosissima Roxb. ex Hornem. (1819); Justicia trinervia Vahl (1804); Justicia uninervis S.Moore (1908); Justicia variegata (Nees) Martelli (1888), nom. illeg.; Nicoteba trinervia (Vahl) Lindau (1893)

= Nicoteba betonica =

Species of flowering plant

Nicoteba betonica is a species of flowering plant native to Africa and Indian subcontinent.

== Common names ==
It goes by the common name squirrel's tail and paper plume.

== Range ==
The species is native to Angola, Bangladesh, Botswana, South Africa, Eswatini, Ethiopia, India, Kenya, Malawi, Mali, Mozambique, Namibia, Senegal, Sri Lanka, Sudan, South Sudan, Tanzania, Uganda, Zambia, Democratic Republic of the Congo, and Zimbabwe.

The species was introduced to Colombia, Costa Rica, Guyana, Panama, Solomon Islands as well as regions like Hawaii, and New Caledonia.

It is also found in tropical regions of China, Australia, Malaysia, Philippines, and Indonesia.

Its habitat includes wastelands, hedges, and ravines.
