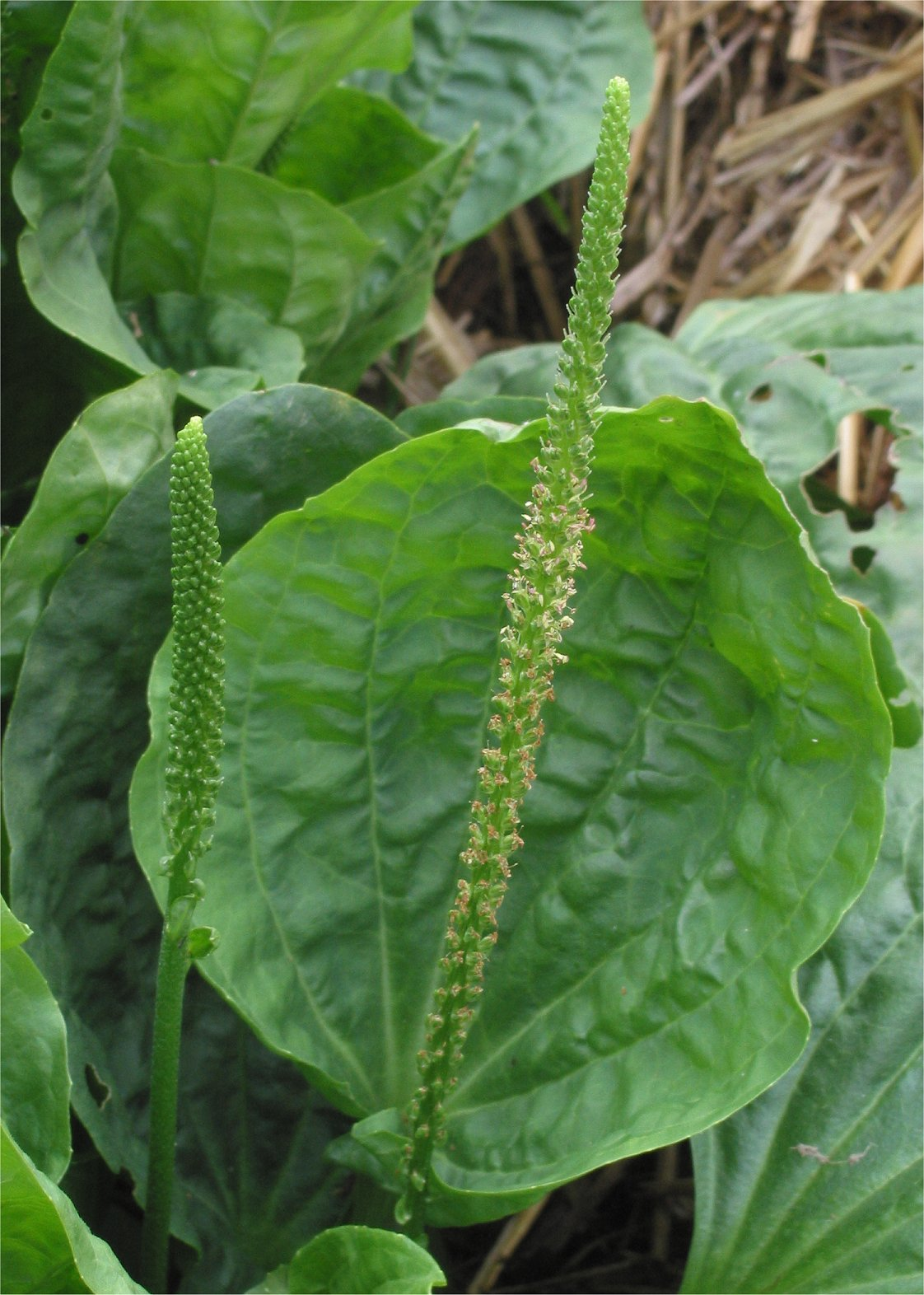

Conservation status
- Least Concern (IUCN 3.1)

Scientific classification
- Kingdom: Plantae
- Clade: Embryophytes
- Clade: Tracheophytes
- Clade: Angiosperms
- Clade: Eudicots
- Clade: Asterids
- Order: Lamiales
- Family: Plantaginaceae
- Genus: Plantago
- Species: P. major

Binomial name
- Plantago major L.

= Plantago major =

Species of flowering plant in the plantain family

Plantago major, the greater plantain, is a species of flowering plant in the plantain family Plantaginaceae. It is native to Eurasia and temperate Africa, and widely naturalised elsewhere.

Greater plantain is not closely related to the fruit also known as plantain, which is a type of banana.

== Description ==
Plantago major is a herbaceous, perennial plant with a rosette of leaves 15–30 centimetres (6–12 inches), exceptionally 70 centimetres (28 inches), in diameter. Each leaf is oval-shaped, 3–18 cm (1–7 in) long and 2–11 cm (3/4–4 1/4 in) broad, rarely up to 30 cm (12 in) long and 21 cm (8 in) broad, with an acute apex, a smooth margin, and a distinct petiole almost as long as the leaf itself. There are three to seven (rarely nine) conspicuous veins over the length of the leaf. The flowers are small, greenish-brown with purple stamens, produced in a dense spike 1–20 cm (0–8 in) (rarely to 40 cm (16 in)) long on top of a stem 2–18 cm (1–7 in) (rarely to 70 cm (28 in)) tall; flowering is from May to October in the Northern Hemisphere.

Greater plantain is wind-pollinated and propagates primarily by seeds, which are held on the long, narrow spikes which rise well above the foliage. Each plant can produce up to 20,000 seeds, which are very small and oval-shaped, with a bitter taste.

== Taxonomy ==
There are three subspecies:

- Plantago major subsp. major. Occurs throughout the range of the species.
- Plantago major subsp. intermedia (Gilib.) Lange. Occurs in Europe, northwest Africa, and northern Asia, but its distribution is not well studied; it grows in wetter habitats, including saline locations such as saltmarshes and beside salted roads. It differs in having finely hairy, narrower, 3–5-veined leaves.
- Plantago major subsp. winteri (Wirtg.) W.Ludw. Occurs in central and northeastern Europe.

== Distribution and habitat ==
Greater plantain is native to almost all of Europe (Iceland excepted), northern and central Asia, and northern and southern Africa. and has become widely naturalised elsewhere in the world.

The ability of greater plantain to survive frequent trampling and colonise compacted soils makes it important for soil rehabilitation. Its roots break up hardpan surfaces, while simultaneously holding together the soil to prevent erosion. The seeds are a common contaminant in cereal grain and other crop seeds. As a result, it now has a nearly worldwide distribution. Plantago major grows in lawns and fields, along roadsides, and in other areas that have been disturbed by humans. It does particularly well in compacted or disturbed soils, but can also occur in undisturbed grassland.

=== Other names ===
As a result of its wide occurrence, Plantago major has many vernacular names. In addition to greater plantain, other recorded vernacular names include broadleaf plantain, common plantain, broad-leaved plantain, cart track plant, dooryard plantain, greater plantago, healing blade, hen plant, lambs foot, roadweed, roundleaf plantain, snakeroot, waybread, wayside plantain, and white man's footprint. Plantago major is believed to be one of the first plants to reach North America after European colonisation. Reportedly brought to the Americas by Puritan colonists, greater plantain was known among some Native American peoples by the name "white man's footprint", because it thrived in the disturbed and damaged ecosystems surrounding European settlements.

== Uses ==
The leaves are edible and can be used to stop bleeding, soothe burns and insect bites. The mature plant contains pliable and tough fibres that can be used in survival situations to make small cords, fishing line, sutures, or braiding. Some cultivars are planted as ornamentals in gardens, including 'Rubrifolia' with purple leaves, and 'Variegata' with variegated leaves. The leaves are edible as a salad green when young and tender, but they quickly become tough and fibrous as they get older. The older leaves can be cooked in stews. The seeds are so small that they are tedious to gather, but they can be ground into a flour substitute or extender.

Plantain contains phytochemicals including allantoin, aucubin, ursolic acid, flavonoids, and asperuloside. Plantain extract has been studied for its potential health effects. Plantain leaves were used commonly in folk medicine for skin poultices on wounds, sores, or insect stings. The root was used for fever and respiratory infections.

100 g of fresh leaves provides 18.4 kcal from 2.29 g protein, 2.03 g net carbohydrates and 0.18 g fat. They are high in fibre with 3.88 g fibre per 100 g.

== Gallery ==
Fruiting spikes, Norway

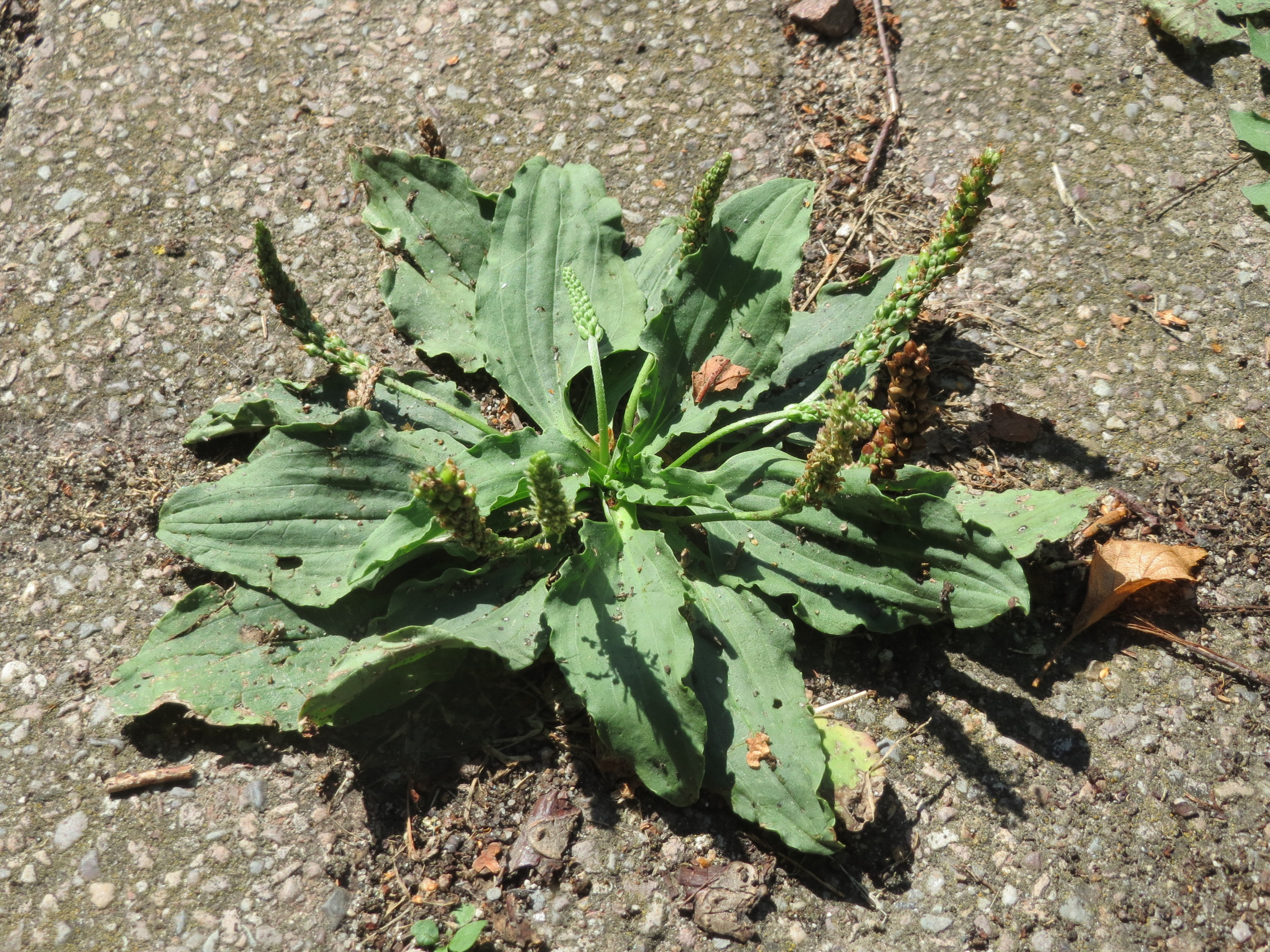
Growing in a crack in a footpath, Germany

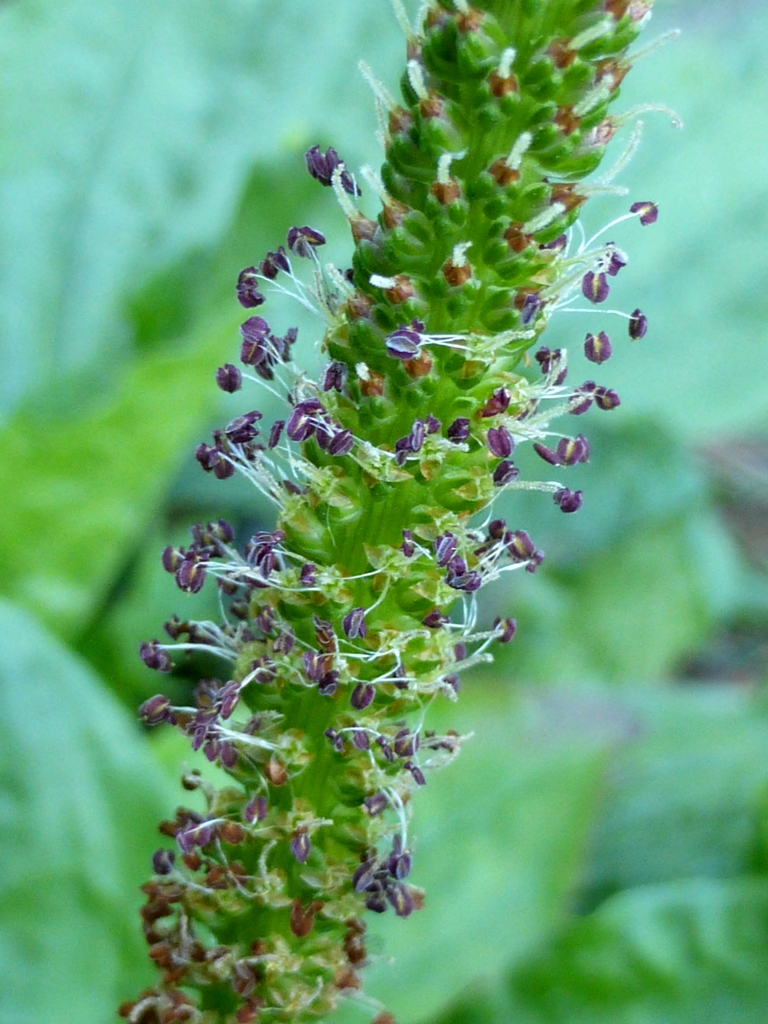
Close-up of the reduced, grass-like flowers; Poland

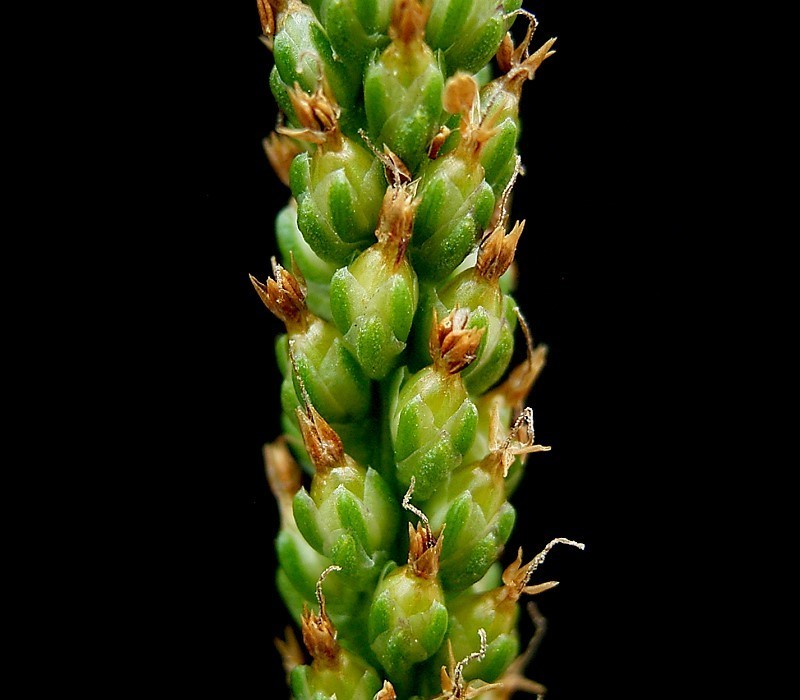
Developing fruit

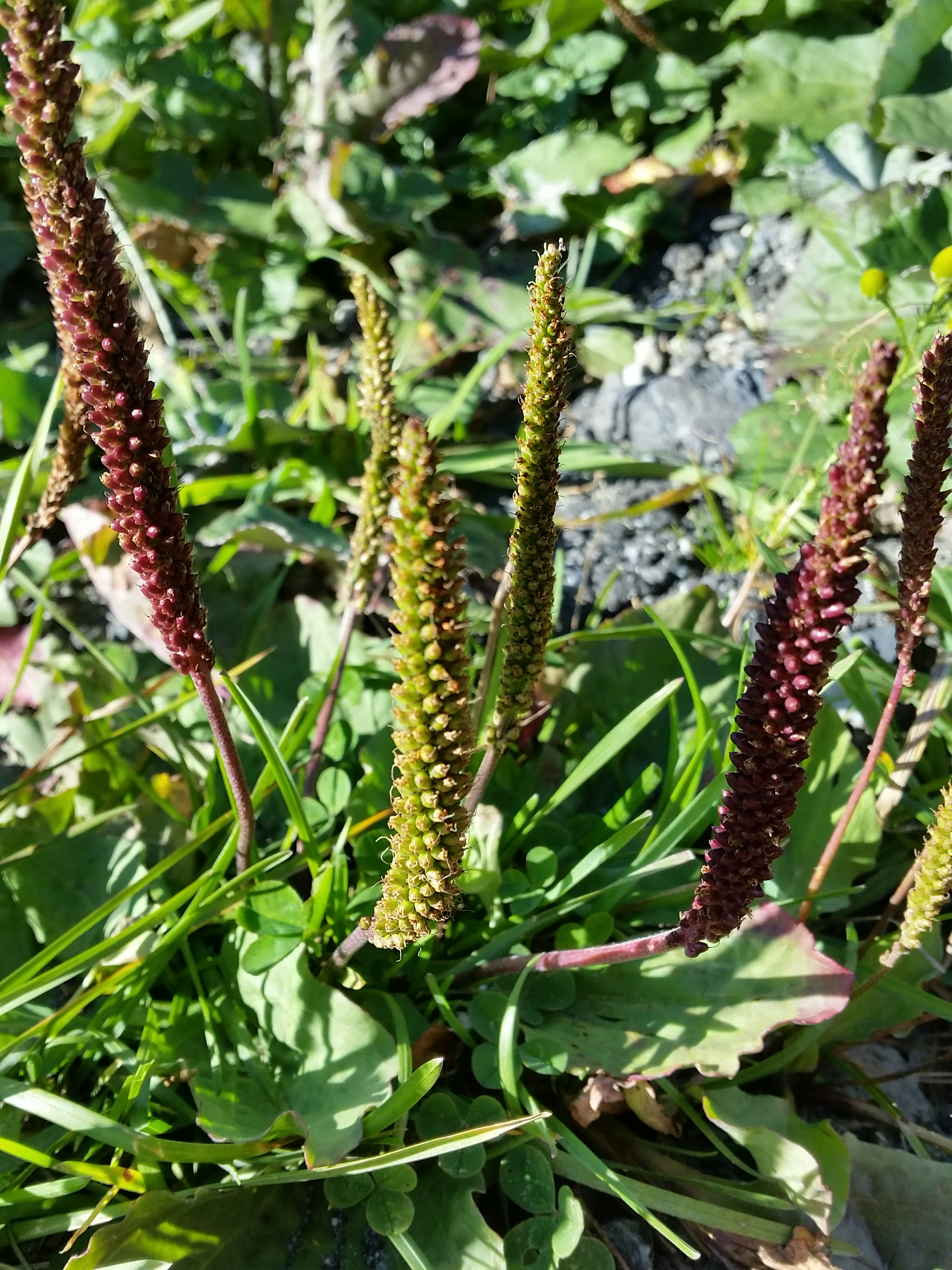
Mature fruit spikes, Spain

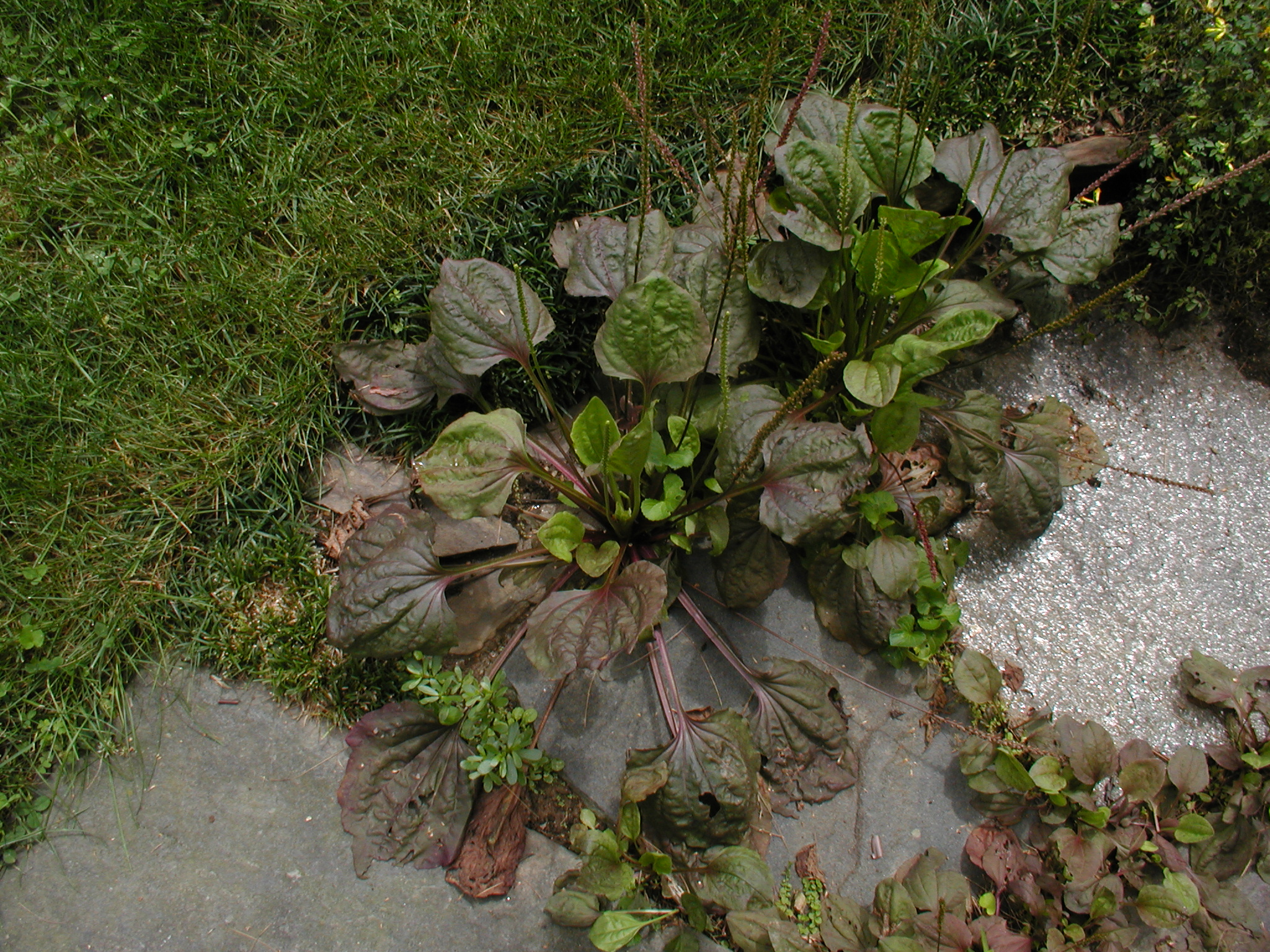
Cultivar 'Rubrifolia'
