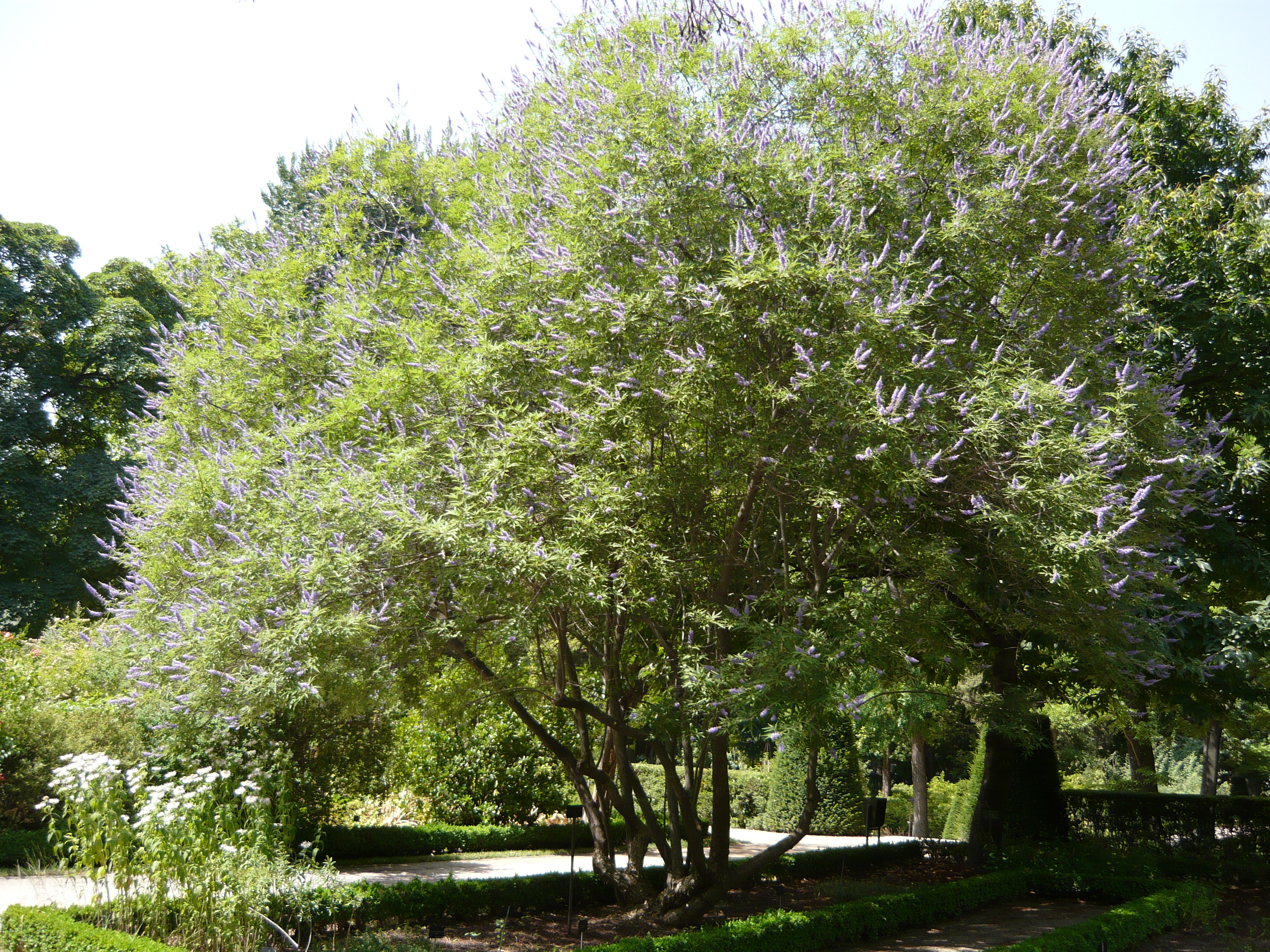

Conservation status
- Data Deficient (IUCN 3.1)

Scientific classification
- Kingdom: Plantae
- Clade: Tracheophytes
- Clade: Angiosperms
- Clade: Eudicots
- Clade: Asterids
- Order: Lamiales
- Family: Lamiaceae
- Genus: Vitex
- Species: V. agnus-castus

Binomial name
- Vitex agnus-castus L.

= Vitex agnus-castus =

Species of flowering plant in the mint family

Vitex agnus-castus (also called vitex, chaste tree / chastetree, chasteberry, Abraham's balm, lilac chastetree, or monk's pepper) is a plant native of the Mediterranean region. It is one of the few temperate-zone species of Vitex, which is on the whole a genus of tropical and subtropical flowering plants. Vitex is a cross-pollinating plant, but its self-pollination has been recorded.

Theophrastus mentioned the shrub several times, as ágnos (ἄγνος) in Enquiry into Plants. It has been long believed to be an anaphrodisiac – leading to its name as "chaste tree" – but its effectiveness for such action remains unproven. The shrub was utilized for religious rituals in ancient Greece and among the Philistines in modern Palestine as well as other countries in the Levant region.

== Etymology and common names ==
Vitex, its name in Pliny the Elder, is derived from the Latin vieo, meaning to weave or to tie up, a reference to the use of V. agnus-castus in basketry. Its macaronic specific name agnus-castus repeats "chaste" in both Greek and Latin; the small tree was considered to be sacred to the virginal goddess Hestia/Vesta. The most common names are "chaste tree", "vitex", and "monk's pepper".

== Description ==
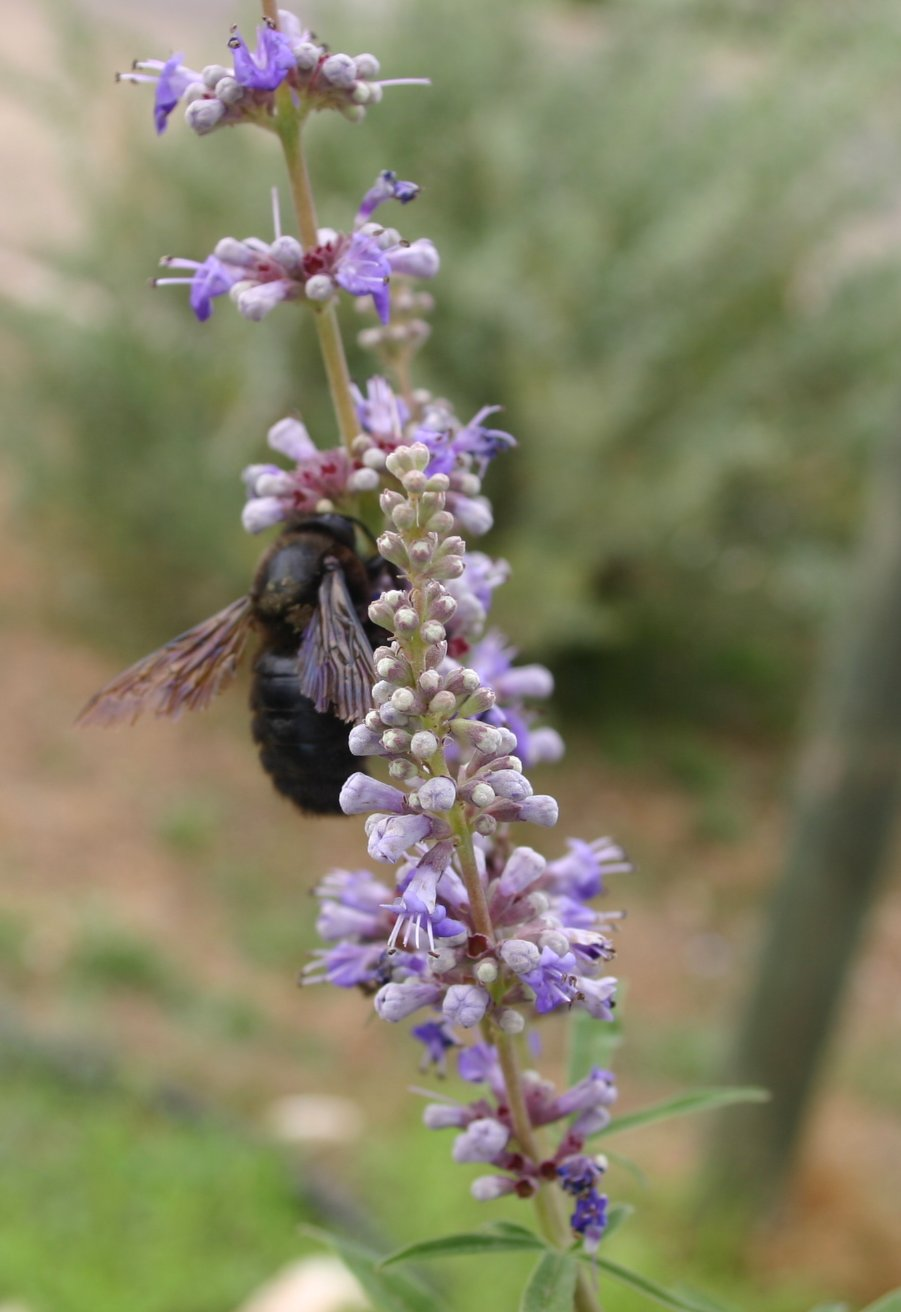
Close up of flowers with carpenter bee (Xylocopa sp.)

Vitex agnus-castus is widely cultivated in warm, temperate, and subtropical regions for its delicately textured, aromatic foliage and butterfly-attracting midsummer spikes of lavender flowers opening in late summer in cooler climates. It grows to a height of 1–5 m (3–16 ft). It requires full sun, though tolerates partial shade, along with well-draining soil. Under ideal conditions, it is hardy to −23 °C (−9 °F) USDA Zone 6. In colder zones, the plant tends to die back to the ground, but as it flowers on new wood, flowering is not affected on vigorous growth in the following season. Cold and wet weather results in dieback and losses. The plant grows well on loamy, neutral to alkaline soil.

In cultivation in the UK, the form V. agnus-castus f. latifolia has gained the Royal Horticultural Society's Award of Garden Merit.

The fruits from one single tree can be harvested for more than 15 years. This indicates that the tree cannot be integrated in a usual crop rotation system. It is suggested to sow dissimilar plants such as monocots as its subsequent crop so that it might be easier to control the monk's pepper plant, the dicot. Because the fruits of monk's pepper tend to fall constantly and uncontrollably, the plant likely can germinate from seed. The overall best yield per hectare reportedly can be achieved if the plant spacing is around 70 cm (28 in). Pruning back the branches in autumn has a positive influence on fruit yield while repruning in spring can induce an increase of vegetative shoots, thus a fruit yield loss.

=== Reproduction ===
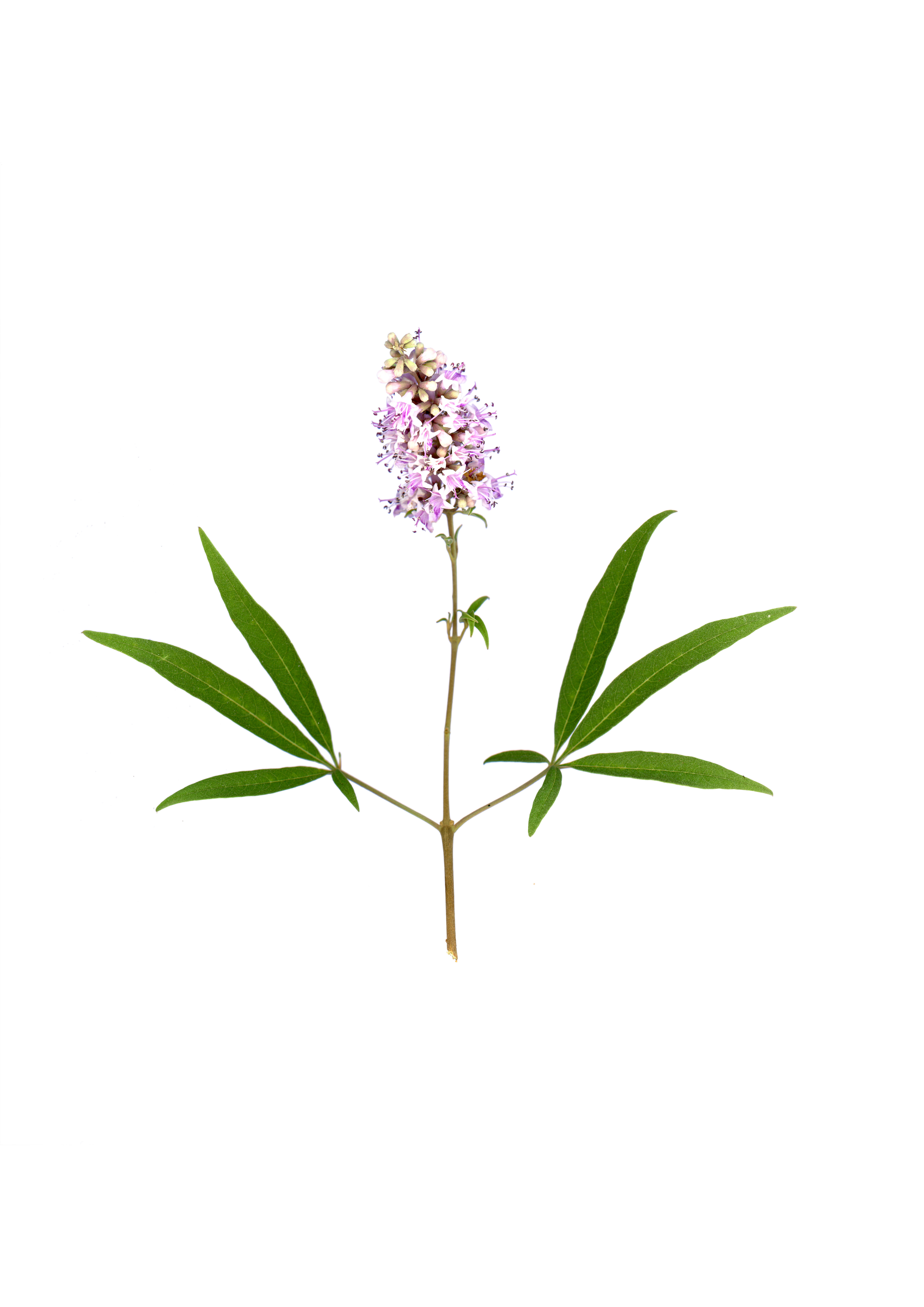

This plant can also be reproduced vegetatively. One possibility is to use 5–8-centimetre (2–3 in) pieces of the ripening wood with buds in July or August and another is to cut the ripe wood in November and then let it root in a coldframe. Also in vitro reproduction with spike of the shoots or node explants is possible.

=== Harvest ===
The flowering and ripening processes do not happen simultaneously, enabling harvesting of both fresh fruits and seeds over a long span of time. The fruits tend to fall from the plant as they ripen, getting lost in the soil. Thus, it has no optimal fixed harvest time. Consequently, to avoid yield loss, unripe fruits need to be harvested. This early harvesting has no effect on quality. Overall, harvesting the fruits by hand likely is the most convenient solution.

=== Diseases and pests ===
Thysanoptera, also known as thrips, can cause great damage to the growth and the generative development of V. agnus-castus. The insect feeds on chaste tree by sucking up the fruit contents or puncturing them. Also, chaste tree is the only known host (especially in Israel) for Hyalesthes obsoletus. This cicada is the vector for black wood disease of grapevines. H. obsoletus prefers V. agnus-castus as a host to the grapevine. In this case, chaste trees can be used as a biological control agent by planting them around vineyards to trap the H. obsoletus. V. agnus-castus was found not only to be an appropriate food source for the adult vectors, but also a reservoir of Candidatus phytoplasma solani (bacterial Phytoplasma species), the causal agent of the black wood disease in grapevines. The pathogen-caused leaf spot disease can almost defoliate V. agnus castus. Furthermore, root rot can occur when soils are kept too moist.

== Chemical compounds ==
Flavonoids (vitexin, casticin), iridoid glycoside (agnuside, aucubin), p-hydroxybenzoic acid, alkaloids, essential oils, fatty oils, diterpenoids and steroids have been identified in the chemical analysis of V. agnus-castus. They occur in the fruits and in the leaves.

=== Essential oils ===
Essential oils have been found in the fruits and in the leaves. The oil of leaves, unripe, and ripe fruits differ in compounds; 50 compounds were identified in the oil of unripe fruits, 51 compounds in the oil of ripe fruits, and 46 compounds in the oil of the leaves. 1,8-Cineole and sabinene are the main monoterpene components and beta-caryophyllene is the major sesquiterpene compound found in the fruits of V. agnus-castus. Some slight differences occur between fruits from white-flowering plants compared to violet-flowering ones. The oil of fruits of former has a higher amount of monoterpene constituents. The leaves mainly contain 1,8-cineole, trans-beta-farnesene, alpha-pinene, trans-beta-caryophyllene, and terpinen-4-ol. The oil, particularly from white-flowering plants, is under preliminary research for its potential antibacterial effects.

== Uses ==
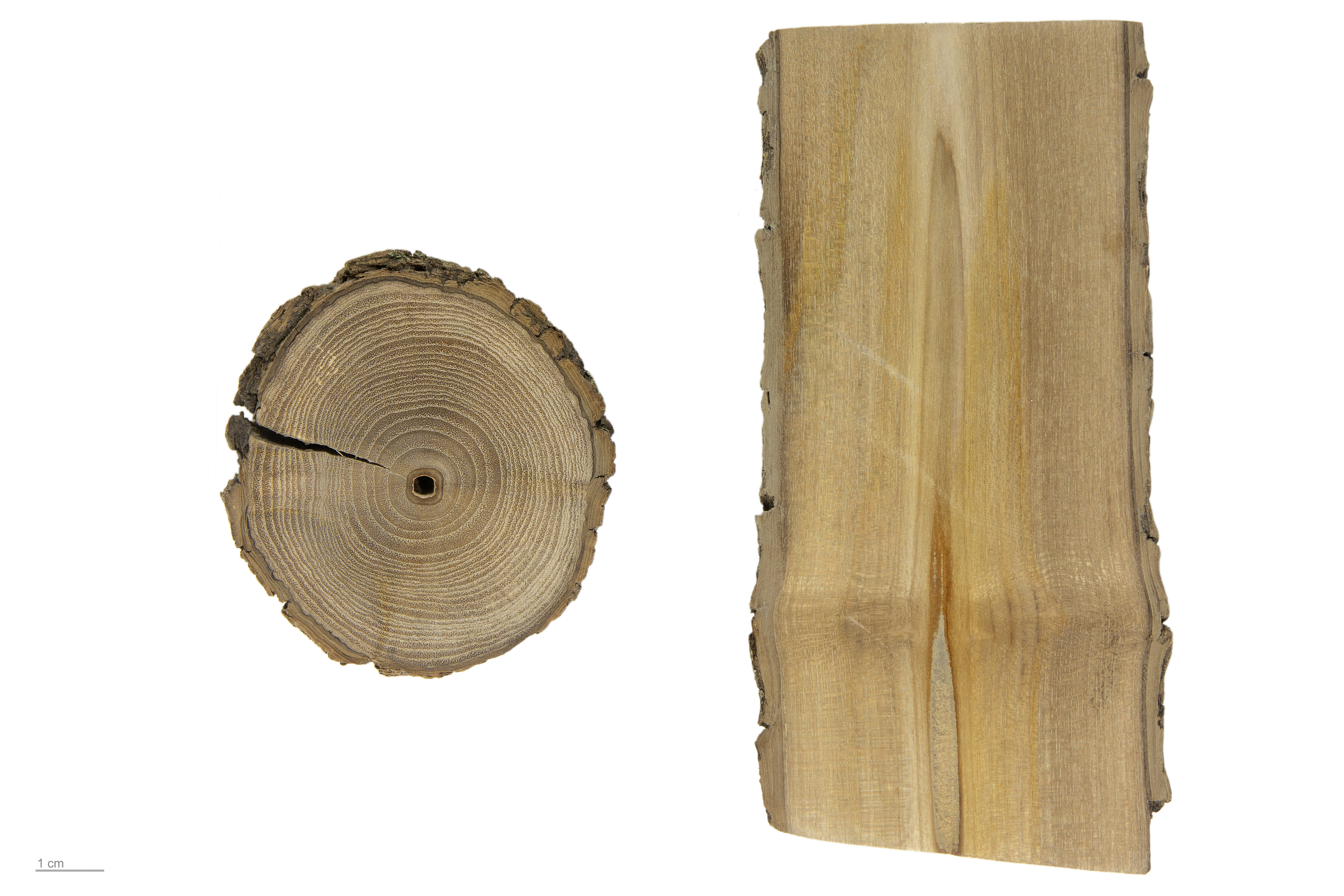
Vitex agnus-castus (MHNT)

=== Culinary uses and folk medicine ===
The chaste tree, a local shrub known since the Lower Paleolithic, has been used by several ancient Mediterranean cultures as a spice. The taste of its fruit is pungent, and can be used to replace pepper. In traditional medicine in bygone times, they were considered effective at suppressing sexual urges and were therefore referred to as "the pepper of monks."

Vitex has been used in folk medicine for its presumed reproductive health effects in women, but little high-quality clinical evidence supports its effectiveness. Although it is commonly recommended in Germany, V. agnus-castus should be avoided during pregnancy due to the possibility of complications.

It is also used to treat symptoms of PMS, such as breast soreness and mood swings.

Hippocrates recommended the plant for injuries and inflammation. Four hundred years later, Dioscorides used it to reduce womb inflammation and increase breast milk supply in new mothers. In addition to the therapeutic heritage of ancient Greece, a diverse range of medical traditions have made use of the plant, such as Ayurveda on the Indian subcontinent, as well as Chinese and Malay herbal medicine. These approaches also acknowledge the utility of Vitex for women's health, as well as gastrointestinal maladies, fever management, and rheumatism.

=== Practical use ===
Greece: From ancient times and through the ages, the bendable branches of the tree were used for weaving baskets. On the Greek island of Kefalonia, the trees branches were mixed with reeds in basket construction for grape and olive harvesting. Academic scholarship holds that the ropes referred to in "The Odyssey" were made from chaste-tree branches.

=== Religious use ===
In ancient Greece, the chaste tree played a significant role in the female agricultural festival of Thesmophoria, dedicated to honoring the goddesses Demeter and Persephone in Greek cities. In Archaic Sparta, in the 8th–6th centuries BCE, it was incorporated into the cult of the local agriculture goddess, Artemis Orthia. The first century physician Dioscorides documented various synonyms for the lilac chaste tree. In the second century CE, Pausanias mentioned that the wooden image of Asclepius in Sparta was crafted from the chaste tree. Additionally, there is botanical and textual evidence supporting the significance of the chaste tree at the Heraion of Samos during the 6th–3rd centuries BCE. It was believed that Hera, the goddess of marriage, was born under the bush, and as a result, women in Thesmophoria ceremonies would lie on its branches, as a way of becoming purified (hence the term "chaste berry.")

In a Philistine temple at Gath, an excavation uncovered around 100 chaste tree fruits, a find unparalleled in both quantity and context compared to other locations in Israel. This suggests their deliberate use in religious practices, possibly in celebration of a goddess related to Hera.

Notably, the chaste tree is linked to the binding of Hera, where it featured in rituals celebrating her mythology at Samos.

== Safety and adverse effects ==
Adverse effects from Vitex can include nausea, headache, gastrointestinal discomfort, menstrual discomfort, fatigue, and skin disorders. People taking dopamine-related medications or Parkinson's disease medications should avoid using chasteberry. Women on birth-control pills, hormone-replacement therapy, or having a hormone-sensitive condition, such as breast cancer, are advised not to use chasteberry. Use of Vitex is discouraged for pregnant or breastfeeding women, and for children.
