= Casticin =

Names
- IUPAC name 3′,5-Dihydroxy-3,4′,6,7-tetramethoxyflavone
- Systematic IUPAC name 5-Hydroxy-2-(3-hydroxy-4-methoxyphenyl)-3,6,7-trimethoxy-4H-1-benzopyran-4-one
- Other names Vitexicarpin

Identifiers
CAS Number	479-91-4
3D model (JSmol)	Interactive image
ChEBI	CHEBI:69355
ChEMBL	ChEMBL452767
ChemSpider	4474632
PubChem CID	5315263
UNII	753GT729OU
CompTox Dashboard (EPA)	DTXSID80197326
- InChI: InChI=1S/C19H18O8/c1-23-11-6-5-9(7-10(11)20)17-19(26-4)16(22)14-12(27-17)8-13(24-2)18(25-3)15(14)21/h5-8,20-21H,1-4H3 Key: PJQLSMYMOKWUJG-UHFFFAOYSA-N; InChI=1/C19H18O8/c1-23-11-6-5-9(7-10(11)20)17-19(26-4)16(22)14-12(27-17)8-13(24-2)18(25-3)15(14)21/h5-8,20-21H,1-4H3 Key: PJQLSMYMOKWUJG-UHFFFAOYAH
- SMILES: COC1=C(C=C(C=C1)C2=C(C(=O)C3=C(C(=C(C=C3O2)OC)OC)O)OC)O

Properties
Chemical formula	C_{19}H_{18}O_{8}
Molar mass	374.34 g/mol
- Except where otherwise noted, data are given for materials in their standard state (at 25 °C [77 °F], 100 kPa). Infobox references

Casticin is a methoxylated flavonol, meaning the core flavonoid structure has methyl groups attached. Found in Artemisia annua, the flavonoid has been shown to enhance the antimalarial activity of artemisinin though casticin itself has no direct antimalarial effects. It has been shown to have anti-mitotic activity. It is also found in Vitex agnus-castus.
