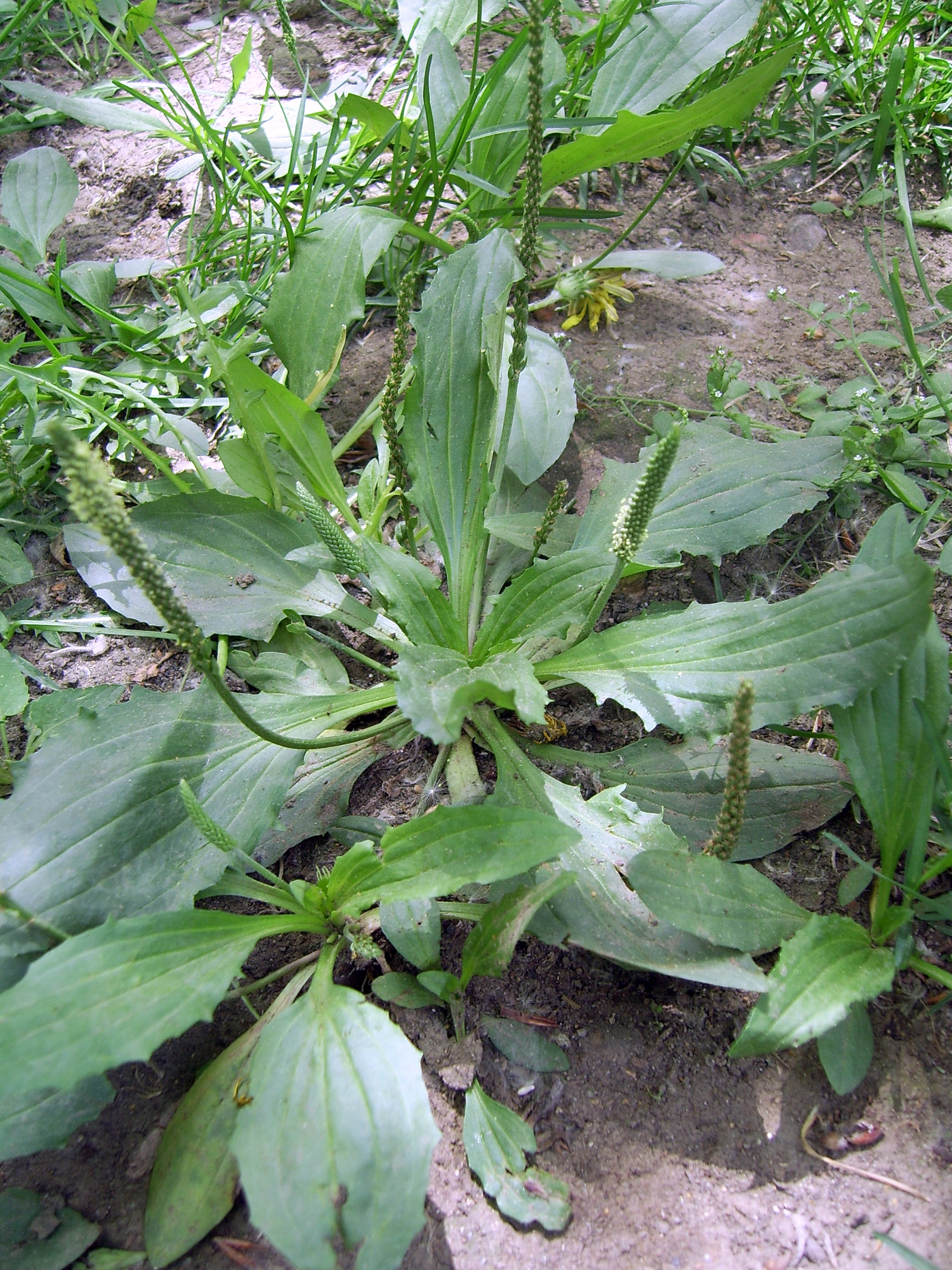

Scientific classification
- Kingdom: Plantae
- Clade: Tracheophytes
- Clade: Angiosperms
- Clade: Eudicots
- Clade: Asterids
- Order: Lamiales
- Family: Plantaginaceae
- Genus: Plantago
- Species: P. asiatica

Binomial name
- Plantago asiatica L.

= Plantago asiatica =

Species of flowering plant in the plantain family

Plantago asiatica, is a self-fertile, perennial species of flowering plant in the plantain family Plantaginaceae. It is native to East Asia (China, Japan, Korea, etc.). It grows well in disturbed areas such as roadsides or even dirt roads. It is valued for its use in folk medicine and it also can be used in cooking.

Common names include Chinese plantain, obako, arnoglossa, and Asiatic plantain.

== Description ==
The plant is a perennial herb that grows up to 20–60 cm (8–24 in) and has short and thick rootstock with numerous fibrous and fasciculate roots. It has short stems with a rosette of broadly ovate to broadly elliptic leaves. Thin or very thin papery leaf blades are 4–12 cm (2–5 in) long, 2.5–6.5 cm (1–3 in) wide, sparsely pubescent, three to seven veins, obtuse to acute apex, broadly cuneate to surrounded base and decurrent to petiole, margins are entire, repand, serrate or dentate. Petioles 3–10 cm (1–4 in) long, sparsely pubescent. The plant has erect spikes of 20–45 cm (8–18 in) high, with many small, white, hairless flowers, and oval sepals that are 1.8–2 cm (0.7–0.8 in) long, tube corolla with five oval lobes, and four stamens. The fruits are oval-shaped pyxis of 3.5 mm (0.1 in) high and 2 mm (0.08 in)m wide, which have four black seeds inside that are up to 1.8 mm (0.07 in) long.

The plant can be a weed in uplands, fields and gardens and it can host aphid and red spider.

Blooming period: April – August, fruiting period: June – September.

== Habitat ==
The plant can grow in many regions, such as mountain slopes, ravines, riverbanks, fields, roadsides, wastelands, lawns.

== Cultivation ==
The plant is hardy, and it can grow in all USDA zones. It likes full sun or part shade, and it can adapt to sandy, loamy, and clay soils with good drainage. Acid, neutral and basic (alkaline) soils are suitable for this plant.

== Medicinal use ==
Traditionally, the plant was used to treat liver disease, stomach problems and urinary system inflammation.

According to traditional Chinese medicine, all parts of the plant are medicine to cool heat and promote urination, cause diuresis, clear damp-heat, brighten the eyes and dislodge phlegm. The leaves and the seeds have anti-inflammatory, antiseptic, antitussive, cardiac, diuretic, expectorant, haemostatic efficacy. The roots can be made into a decoction to treat coughs.

Scientific studies have shown that Plantago asiatica petroleum extract has a significant antidepressant effect, and the hot water extracts of P. major and P. asiatica have anti-leukaemia, anti-cancer and anti-viral activities, as well as the activity of regulating cell-mediated immunity. The seed gel extract can work as a lubricant to promote laxation of humans, and the PSE (Plantago asiatica L. seed extract) can contribute to the treatment or prevention of obesity and relative symptoms as a potential dietary supplement. The Plantaginis Semen inhibits the activities of XOD (xanthine oxidase) significantly, and it can be used in the reduction of hyperuricemia and the treatment of gout. Plantamajoside can be isolated from Plantago asiatica, and it has antioxidant and anti-glycation effects. Thus it can be used to study the effects of natural herbal supplements to prevent diabetic complications.

Pregnant women need to avoid using this medicine, which may cause uterine activity and laxation. Patients cannot take lithium or carbamazepine with plantain at the same time.

Plantago asiatica can cause side effects, such as anaphylaxis, chest congestion, sneezing, watery eyes, occupational asthma, and gastric concretion.

== Toxicology ==
The pollen has allergenic glycoproteins and components that can bind IgE which can mediated sensitization, contributing to seasonal allergy.

== Culinary use ==
The plant is suitable for cooking with grains and stews, and it can also be added to herbal wines.

The leaves of the plant are used in many Japanese dishes, especially soups. In Vietnam, the young leaves are boiled, fried, or made into soup with meat or prawns. It also can be fried with salt, or boiled with Yin Chen (Artemisia capillaris herba) to make Yin Chen Tea.
