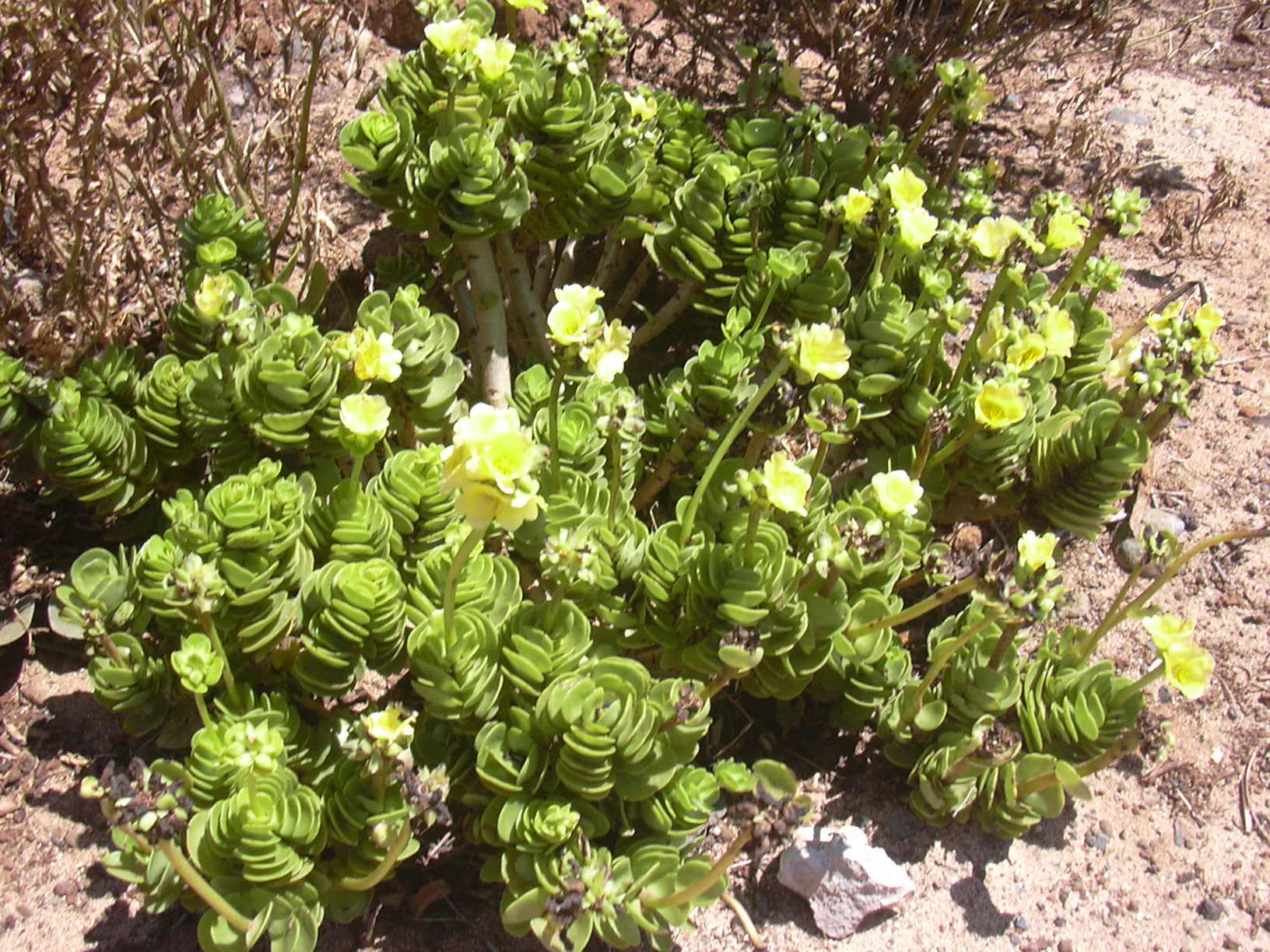

Scientific classification
- Kingdom: Plantae
- Clade: Embryophytes
- Clade: Tracheophytes
- Clade: Spermatophytes
- Clade: Angiosperms
- Clade: Eudicots
- Order: Caryophyllales
- Family: Portulacaceae
- Genus: Portulaca
- Species: P. molokiniensis

Binomial name
- Portulaca molokiniensis Hobdy

= Portulaca molokiniensis =

Species of flowering plant

Portulaca molokiniensis, known also as 'ihi, is a succulent plant endemic to Hawaii. This plant is federally listed as an endangered species. It has small yellow flowers and when grown from seed may produce a caudex. This plant is easy to propagate.

This rare perennial species of Portulaca is restricted to a few coastal sites on Molokini Island (Maui), Puʻukoaʻe Islet and Kamōhio Bay, Kahoʻolawe. It is known to grow in volcanic tuff, detritus at base of sea cliff and on steep rocky slopes from about 30 to about 375 feet.

Portulaca molokiniensis is a rare endemic to the Hawaiian islands where it known to grow in loose volcanic scree on steep slopes and in sand near the seaside on the arid islets of Molokini and Pu'ukoa'e and at Kanhio Bay on Kaho'olawe off the west coast of Maui. Though many think of the Hawaiian islands as lush and moist, the collection sites on these islands are on the leeward, rainshadow side and are extremely dry. Though this plant was first collected by Charles N. Forbes on Molokini in February 1913, it was identified as Portulaca lutea, a plant more widely distributed throughout the Pacific islands. It was collected once again as Portulaca lutea in the 1920s and then not documented again until collections made in the late 1970s and early 1980s where the distinctiveness of the plant was noted and it was officially described as a new species by Hawaii forester Bob Hobdy in 1987.

In the 2020s it started gaining popularity in the succulent plant nursery trade in the U.S. due to its ease of care and lack of common nursery pests.
