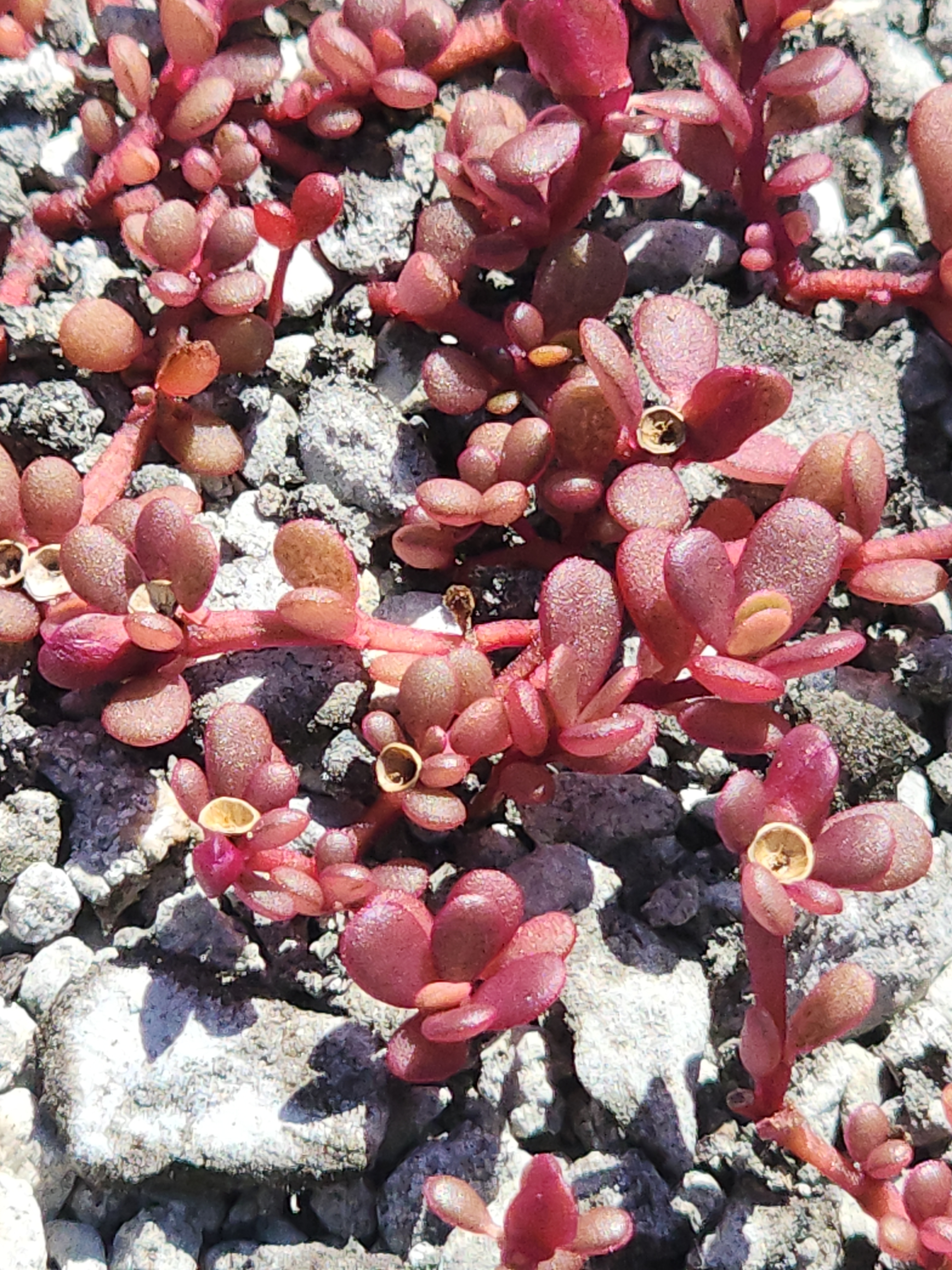

Conservation status
- Imperiled (NatureServe)

Scientific classification
- Kingdom: Plantae
- Clade: Embryophytes
- Clade: Tracheophytes
- Clade: Spermatophytes
- Clade: Angiosperms
- Clade: Eudicots
- Order: Caryophyllales
- Family: Portulacaceae
- Genus: Portulaca
- Species: P. minuta

Binomial name
- Portulaca minuta Correll

= Portulaca minuta =

Species of flowering plant

Portulaca minuta, the tiny purslane, is a rare species of flowering plant. It grows in the Florida Keys and the Bahamas.

== Habitat ==
The populations in Florida are associated with open-canopy pine rockland habitat where it grows in small erosional depressions in otherwise sparsely-vegetated exposed limestone.

== Conservation ==
Prior to 2013, it was thought to be endemic to the Bahamas before being discovered in the Florida Keys on the islands of Big Pine Key, No Name Key, and Lower Sugarloaf Key. It is believed to persist in less than 20 sites.

== Gallery ==
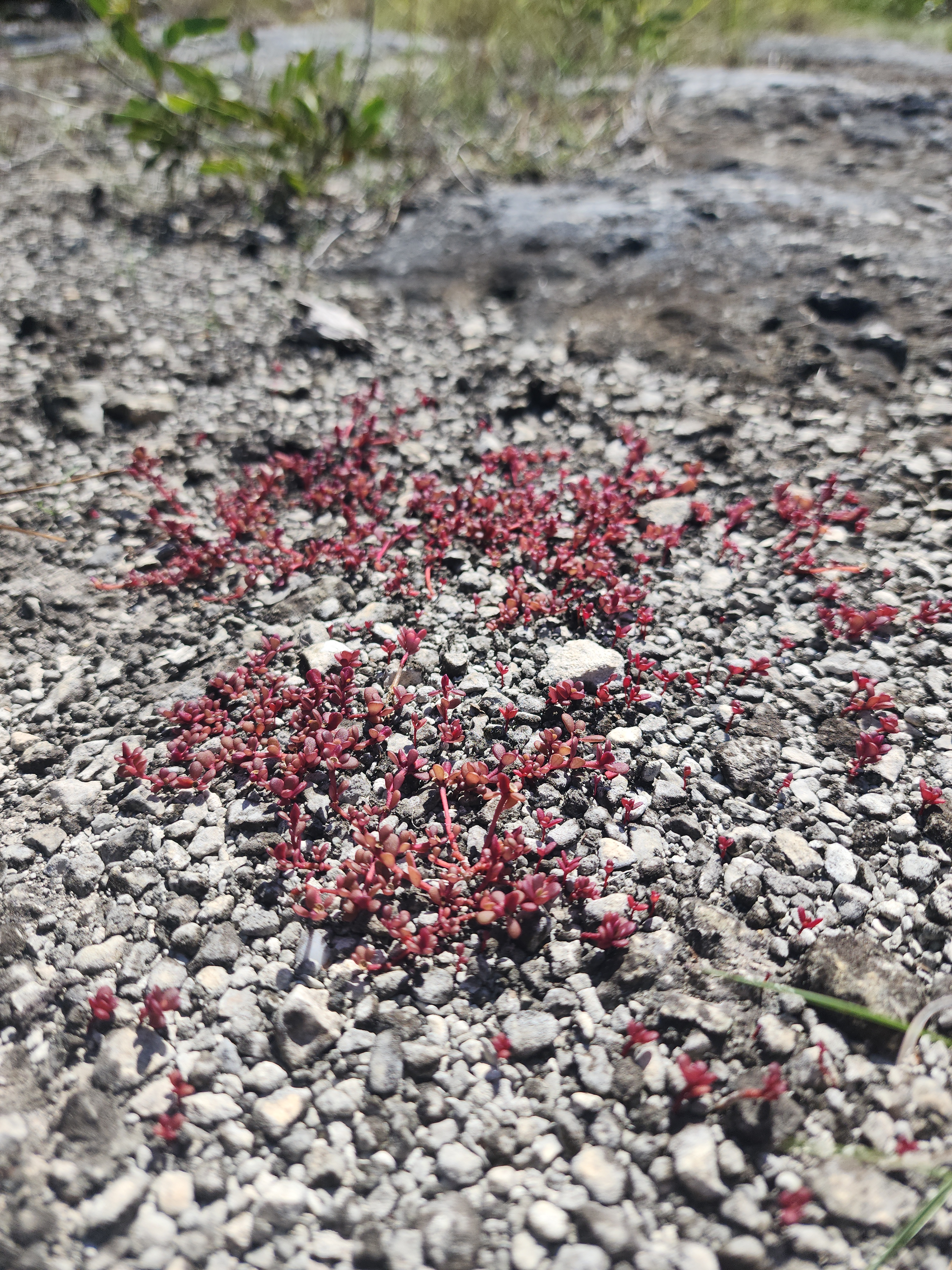
In situ, open-canopy rockland habitat, Big Pine Key, Florida
