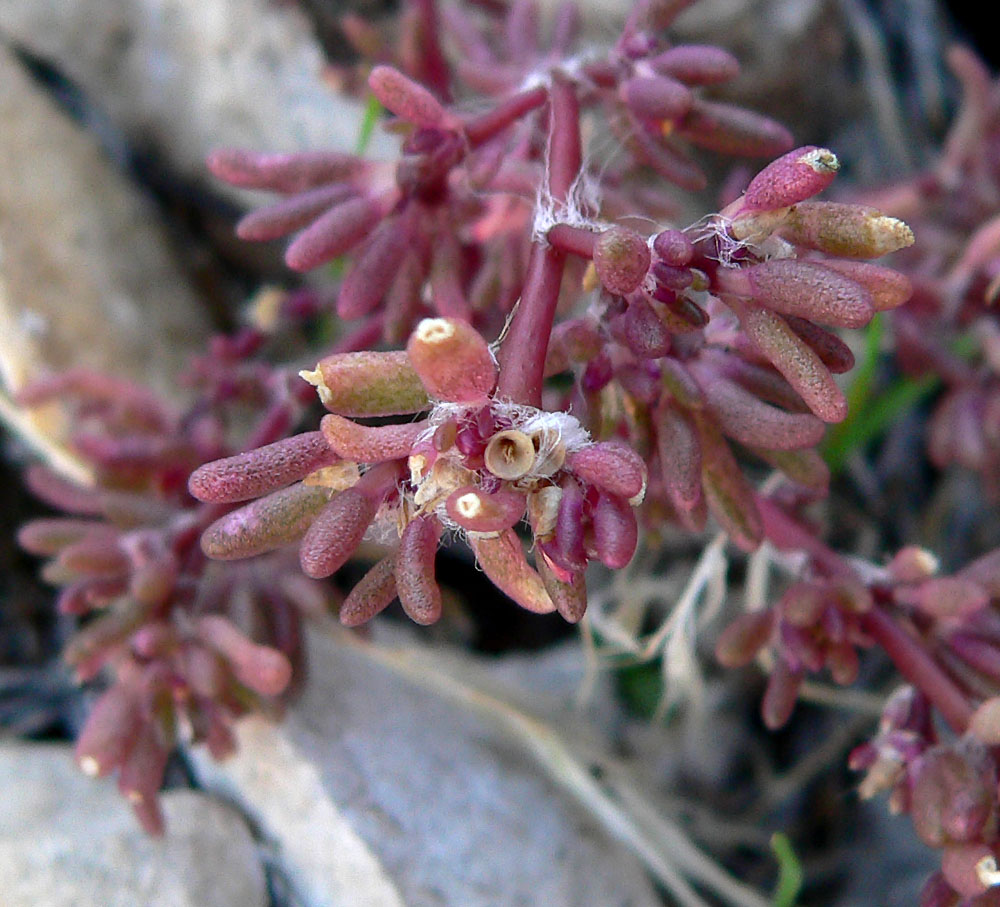

Scientific classification
- Kingdom: Plantae
- Clade: Embryophytes
- Clade: Tracheophytes
- Clade: Spermatophytes
- Clade: Angiosperms
- Clade: Eudicots
- Order: Caryophyllales
- Family: Portulacaceae
- Genus: Portulaca
- Species: P. halimoides

Binomial name
- Portulaca halimoides L.

Synonyms
- Portulaca parvula

= Portulaca halimoides =

Species of flowering plant

Portulaca halimoides is a species of purslane known by the common name silkcotton purslane. It is native to the deserts of the southwestern United States and northern Mexico, as well as parts of Central and South America. It is a fleshy annual herb producing a branching stem spreading to a maximum length around 25 centimeters. It is often pink or red in color and there are strands of woolly hairlike trichomes at nodes along the stem and within the inflorescence. The thick, cylindrical, blunt-tipped leaves are up to 2 centimeters in length and green to red in color. Flowers occur in clusters of up to 10 at the tips of the stem branches. Each is a few millimeters wide with yellow petals which are sometimes hidden under the two fused, fleshy red sepals. The fruit is a tiny capsule which contains several seeds. The grainlike seeds may be black, grayish, or silvery in color.
