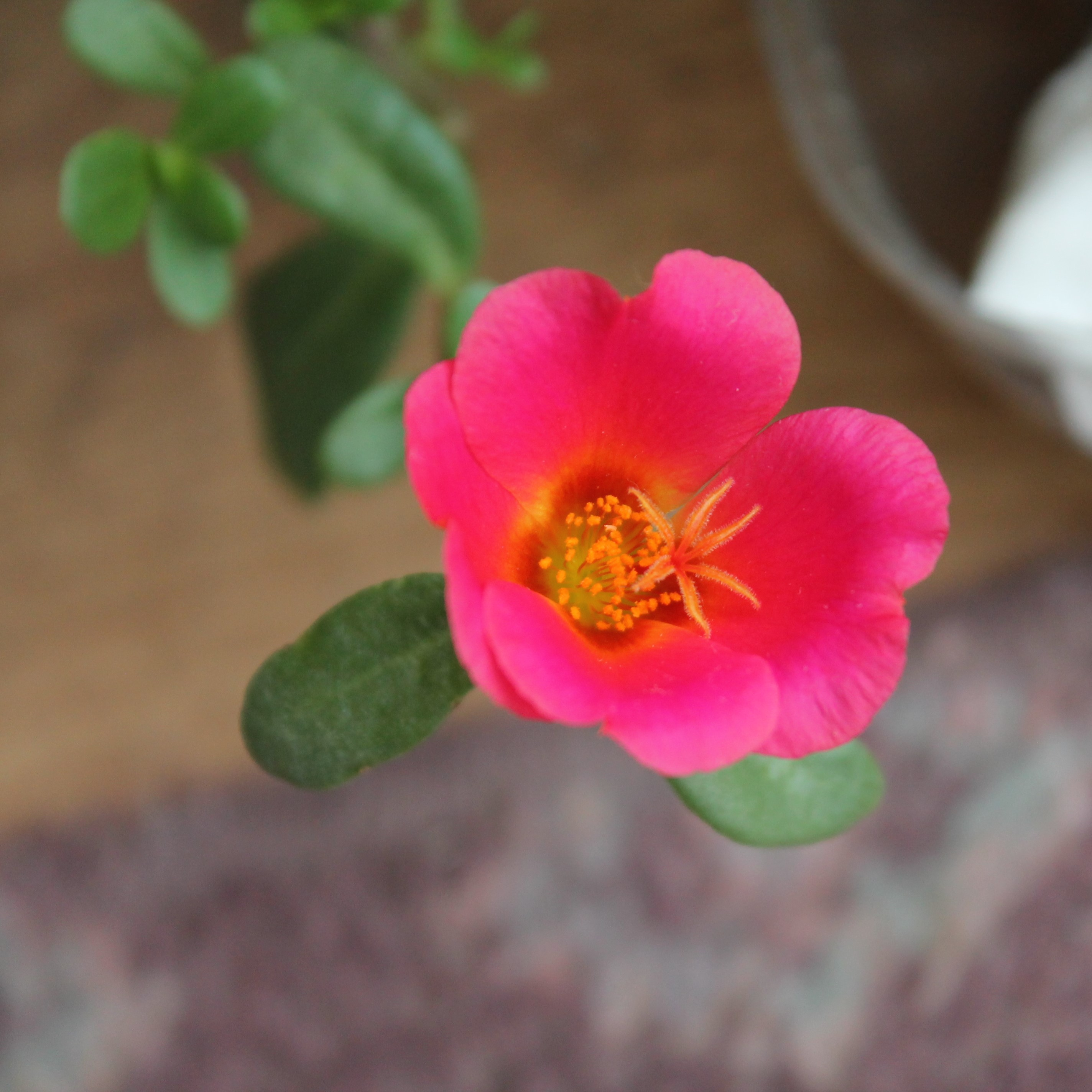

Scientific classification
- Kingdom: Plantae
- Clade: Tracheophytes
- Clade: Angiosperms
- Clade: Eudicots
- Order: Caryophyllales
- Family: Portulacaceae
- Genus: Portulaca; L.

Species
- See text

Synonyms
- Halimus P.Browne; Lemia Vand.; Merida Neck.; Meridiana L.f.; Sedopsis (Engl.) Exell & Mendonça

= Portulaca =

Genus of flowering plants

Portulaca (/ˌpɔːrtʃəˈlækə/ POR-chə-LAK-ə, UK also /ˌpɔːrtjʊˈlækə/ POR-tyuul-AK-ə, US also /ˌpɔːrtʃəˈlɑːkə/ POR-chə-LAH-kə) is a genus of flowering plants in the family Portulacaceae, and is the type genus of the family. With over 100 species, it is found generally in the tropics and warm temperate regions. Portulacas are also known as the purslanes.

Common purslane (Portulaca oleracea) is widely consumed as an edible plant, and in some areas it is considered invasive. Portulaca grandiflora is a well-known ornamental garden plant. Purslanes are relished by chickens. Some Portulaca species are used as food plants by the larvae of some Lepidoptera species including the nutmeg moth (Hadula trifolii).

Some Portulaca species can undergo photosynthesis using the C4 or the CAM light-independent pathway as required depending on environmental conditions.

== Species ==
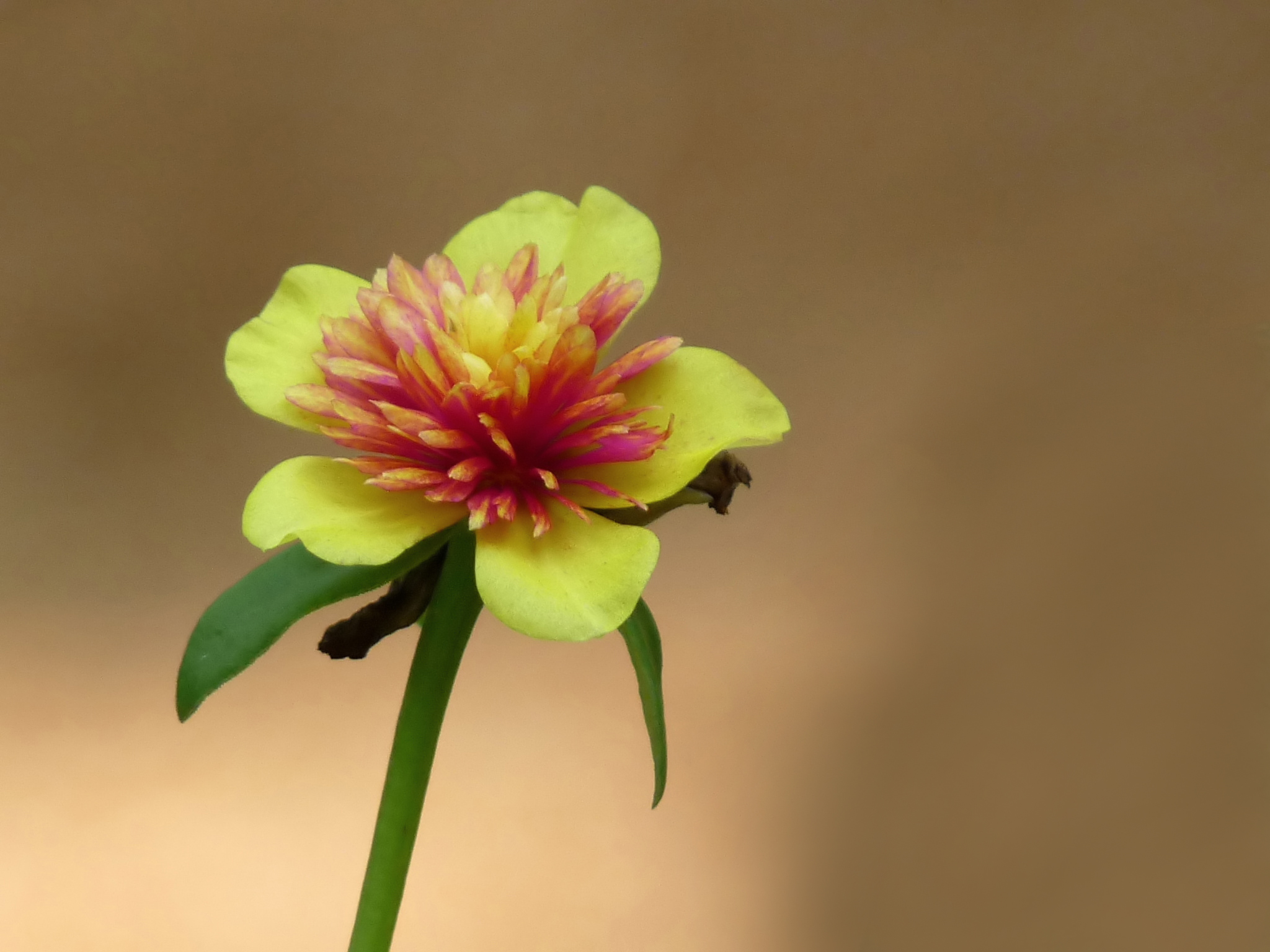
Portulaca 'All Aglow'

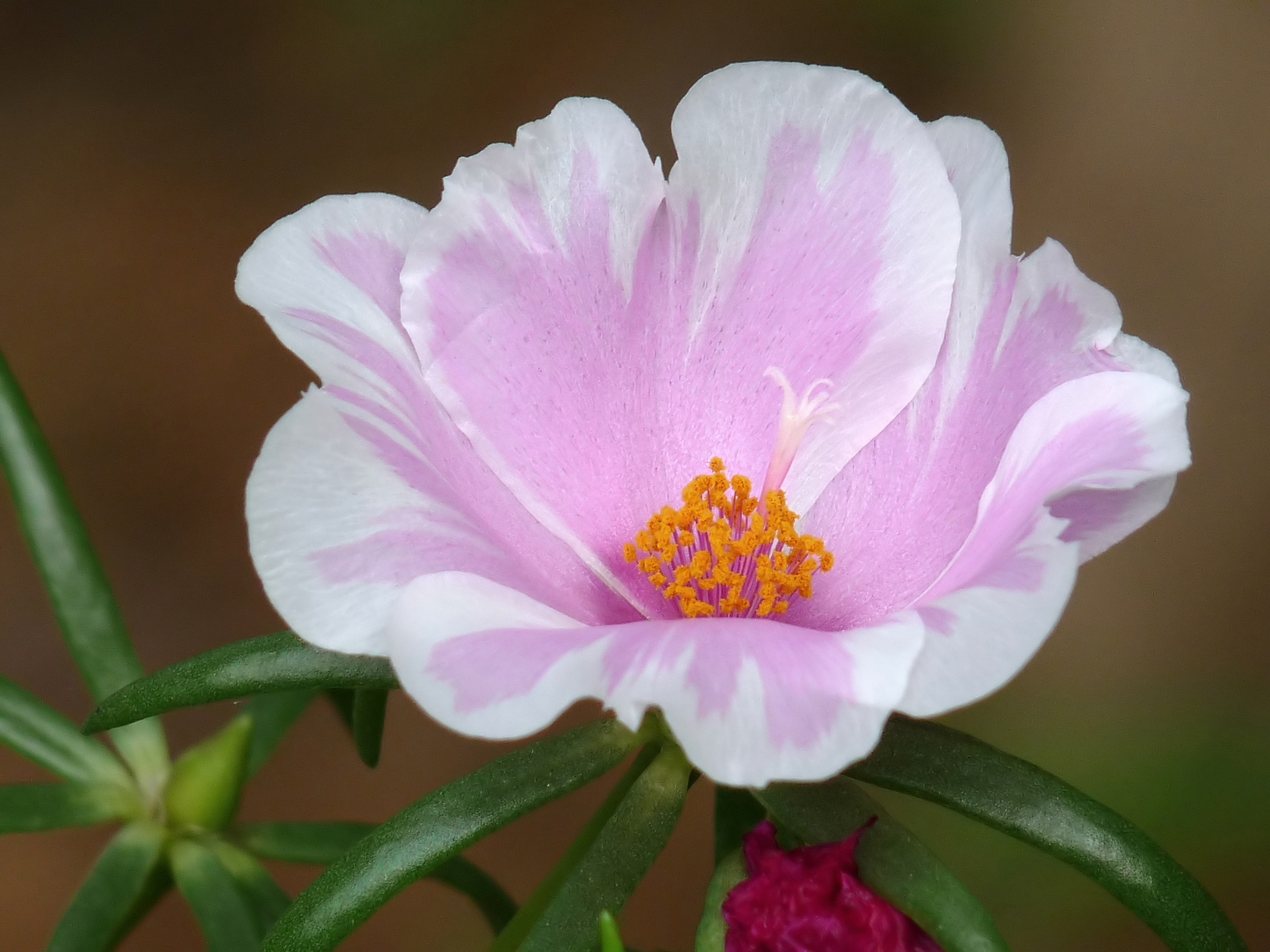
Portulaca grandiflora 'Bicolor'

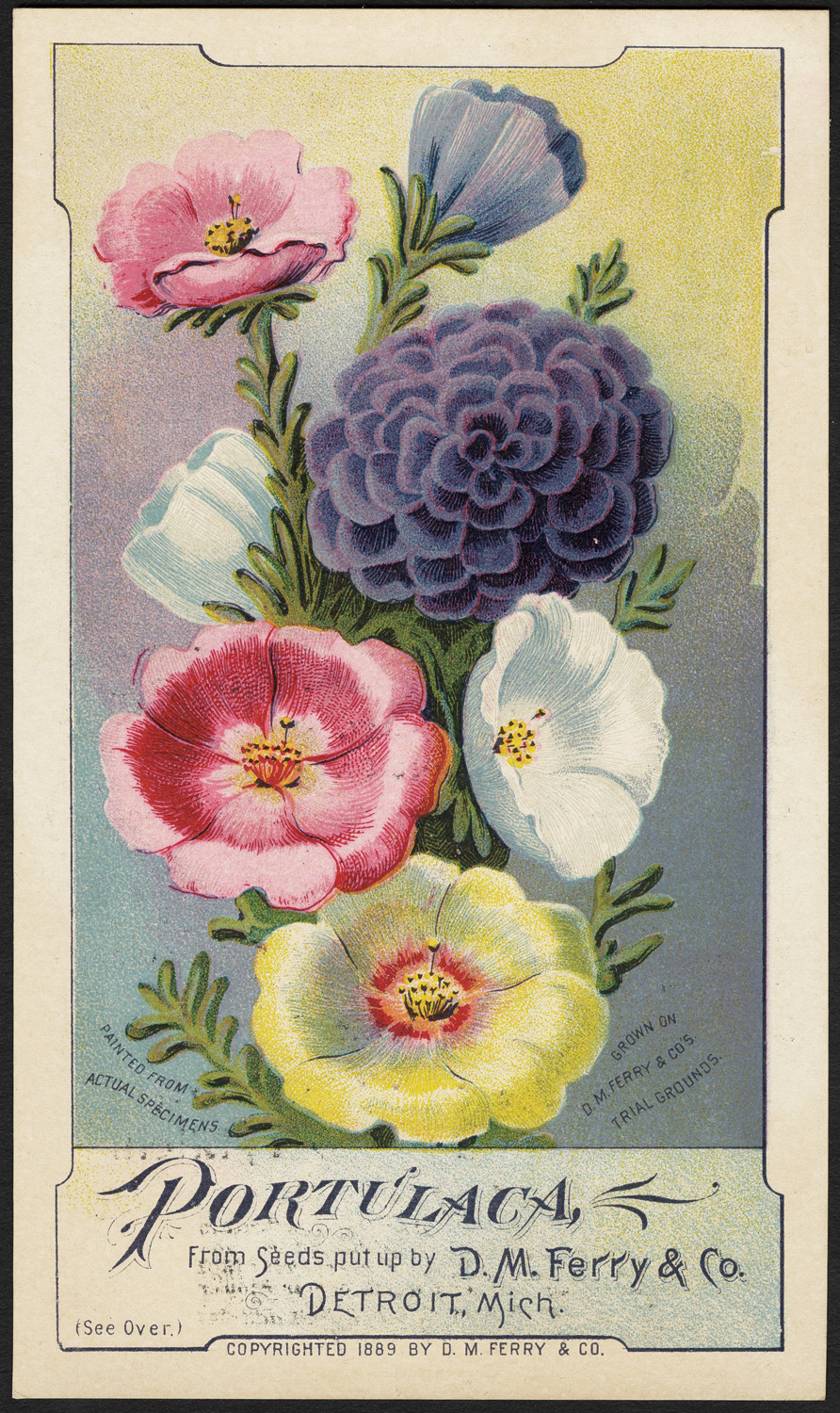
1889 portulaca seed ad by D. M. Ferry & Company of Detroit

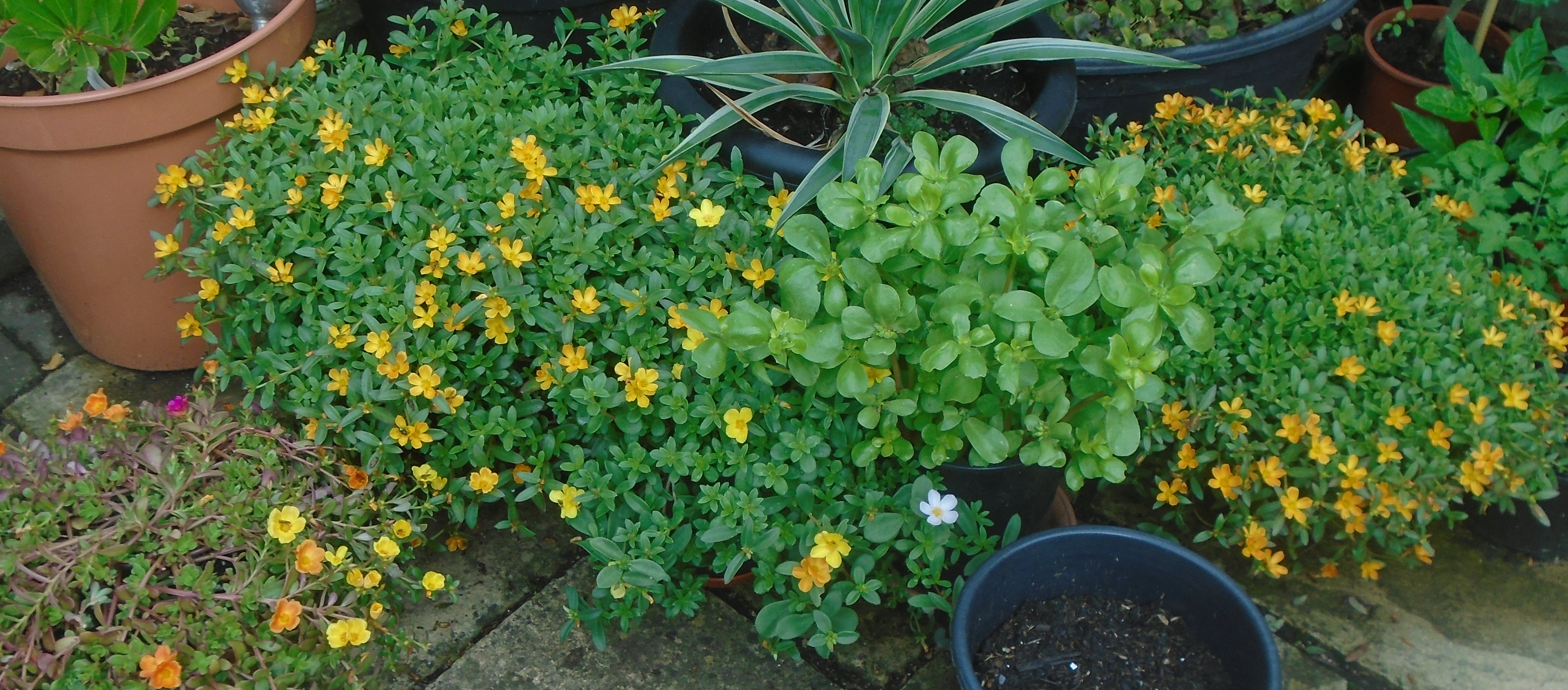
A large array of Portulaca umbraticola and Portulaca oleracea (middle right)

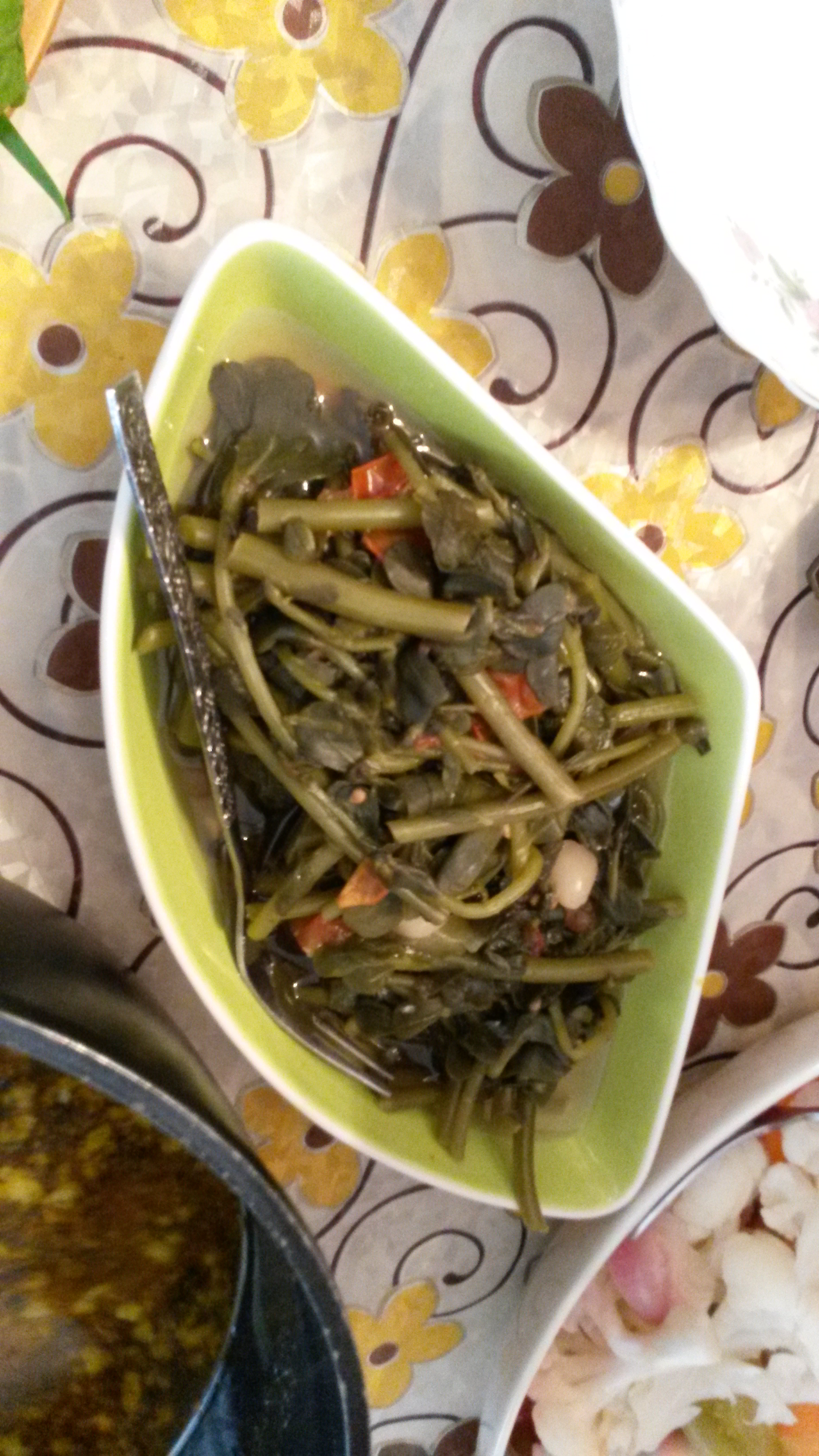
Pickled purslane stems consumed in Armenia

The following species are accepted:

- Portulaca africana (Danin & H.G.Baker) Danin – Western Africa to south China
- Portulaca almeviae Ocampo – Mexico
- Portulaca amilis Speg. – Paraguayan purslane – Peru to Brazil and N. Argentina
- Portulaca anceps A.Rich. – Ethiopia
- Portulaca argentinensis Speg. – Argentina
- Portulaca aurantiaca Proctor – Jamaica
- Portulaca australis Endl. – N. & NE. Australia to W. Central Pacific
- Portulaca badamica S.R.Yadav & Dalavi – India
- Portulaca bicolor F.Muell. – Australian pigweed – Australia
- Portulaca biloba Urb. – Cuban purslane – Cuba
- Portulaca brevifolia Urb. – Cuba to Haiti, NW. Venezuela
- Portulaca bulbifera M.G.Gilbert – Ethiopia, Kenya
- Portulaca californica D.Legrand – Mexico
- Portulaca canariensis Danin & Reyes-Bet. – Canary Islands
- Portulaca cardenasiana D.Legrand – Puerto Rican purslane – Bolivia
- Portulaca caulerpoides Britton & P.Wilson – Puerto Rico
- Portulaca centrali-africana R.E.Fr. – E. DR Congo to NW. Tanzania
- Portulaca chacoana D.Legrand – Paraguay to NE. Argentina
- Portulaca ciferrii Chiov. – S. Somalia to SE. Kenya
- Portulaca clavigera R.Geesink – Western Australia
- Portulaca colombiana D.Legrand – Colombia to Venezuela
- Portulaca commutata M.G.Gilbert – S. Ethiopia to N. Tanzania
- Portulaca confertifolia Hauman – Argentina
- Portulaca conoidea S.M.Phillips – Kenya
- Portulaca constricta M.G.Gilbert – Ethiopia, Somalia
- Portulaca conzattii P.Wilson – Mexico to Central America
- Portulaca coralloides S.M.Phillips – Kenya
- Portulaca cryptopetala Speg. – Argentina, Bolivia, Brazil, Paraguay, Uruguay
- Portulaca cubensis Britton & P.Wilson – Cuba
- Portulaca cyclophylla F.Muell. – Western Australia
- Portulaca cypria Danin – Mediterranean
- Portulaca daninii Galasso, Banfi & Soldano – Brazil, Colombia, Peru, Suriname
- Portulaca decipiens Poelln. – Australia
- Portulaca decorticans M.G.Gilbert – Kenya, Somalia
- Portulaca dhofarica M.G.Gilbert – Oman
- Portulaca diegoi Mattos – Brazil
- Portulaca digyna F.Muell. – Australia
- Portulaca dodomaensis M.G.Gilbert – Tanzania
- Portulaca echinosperma Hauman – Argentina
- Portulaca edulis Danin & Bagella – Cyprus
- Portulaca elatior Mart. ex Rohrb. – Caribbean to S. Tropical America
- Portulaca elongata Rusby – Argentina, Bolivia, Peru
- Portulaca eruca Hauman – Argentina, Paraguay
- Portulaca erythraeae Schweinf. – Eritrea, Sudan
- Portulaca fascicularis Peter – Kenya, Tanzania
- Portulaca filifolia F.Muell. – Australia
- Portulaca filsonii J.H.Willis – Australia
- Portulaca fischeri Pax – Kenya, Tanzania, Uganda
- Portulaca fluvialis D.Legrand – Argentina, Bolivia, Brazil, Paraguay, Peru, Uruguay
- Portulaca foliosa Ker Gawl. – Tropical & S. Africa, Arabian Peninsula
- Portulaca fragilis Poelln. – Bolivia
- Portulaca frieseana Poelln. – Brazil
- Portulaca fulgens Griseb. – Argentina
- Portulaca gilliesii Hook. – Argentina, Bolivia, Paraguay, Uruguay
- Portulaca giuliettiae T.Vieira & A.A.Coelho – Brazil
- Portulaca goiasensis T.Vieira & A.A.Coelho – Brazil
- Portulaca gracilis Poelln. – Bolivia
- Portulaca grandiflora Hook. – moss-rose purslane – Argentina, Bolivia, Brazil, Paraguay, Uruguay
- Portulaca grandis Peter – Ethiopia, Kenya, Tanzania, Uganda
- Portulaca granulatostellulata (Poelln.) Ricceri & Arrigoni – W. Europe to Caucasus; N. Africa to W. Indian ocean
- Portulaca greenwayi M.G.Gilbert – Kenya
- Portulaca guanajuatensis Ocampo – Mexico
- Portulaca halimoides L. – silkcotton purslane – Central & S. U.S. to Tropical America
- Portulaca hatschbachii D.Legrand – Brazil
- Portulaca hereroensis Schinz – Tanzania to S. Africa
- Portulaca heterophylla Peter – Tanzania
- Portulaca hirsutissima Cambess. – Brazil
- Portulaca hoehnei D.Legrand – Brazil
- Portulaca howellii (D.Legrand) Eliasson – Galápagos
- Portulaca humilis Peter – Tanzania
- Portulaca impolita (Danin & H.G.Baker) Danin – U.S.
- Portulaca insignis Steyerm. – Venezuela
- Portulaca intraterranea J.M.Black – Australia
- Portulaca johnstonii Henrickson – Mexico
- Portulaca juliomartinezii Ocampo – Mexico
- Portulaca kermesina N.E.Br. – Eritrea to S. Africa, Arabian Peninsula
- Portulaca kuriensis M.G.Gilbert – Socotra
- Portulaca lakshminarasimhaniana S.R.Yadav & Dalavi – India
- Portulaca lutea Sol. ex G.Forst. – yellow purslane – Pacific
- Portulaca macbridei D.Legrand – Peru
- Portulaca macrantha Ricceri & Arrigoni – Canary Islands, Morocco
- Portulaca macrorhiza R.Geesink – Lesser Sunda Islands
- Portulaca macrosperma D.Legrand – Bolivia
- Portulaca masonii D.Legrand – Mexico
- Portulaca massaica S.M.Phillips – Kenya, Tanzania
- Portulaca matthewsii Ocampo – Mexico
- Portulaca mauritiensis Poelln. – Chagos Archipelago, Mascarenes
- Portulaca mexicana P.Wilson – Mexico
- Portulaca meyeri D.Legrand – Argentina
- Portulaca minensis D.Legrand – Brazil
- Portulaca minuta Correll – Florida, Bahamas
- Portulaca molokiniensis Hobdy – Hawaiian Islands
- Portulaca monanthoides Lodé – Socotra
- Portulaca mucronata Link – Bolivia, Paraguay, Venezuela
- Portulaca mucronulata D.Legrand – Argentina, Brazil
- Portulaca nicaraguensis (Danin & H.G.Baker) Danin – Florida, Guatemala, Nicaragua, Texas
- Portulaca nitida (Danin & H.G.Baker) Ricceri & Arrigoni – Europe to Central Asia, N. Africa
- Portulaca nivea Poelln. – Peru
- Portulaca nogalensis Chiov. – Somalia
- Portulaca oblonga Peter – Ethiopia, Kenya, Tanzania
- Portulaca obtusa Poelln. – Argentina
- Portulaca obtusifolia D.Legrand – Argentina
- Portulaca okinawensis E.Walker & Tawada – Ryukyu Islands
- Portulaca oleracea L. – common purslane, pigweed – Macaronesia, Tropical Africa, Mediterranean into India
- Portulaca oligosperma F.Muell. – Australia
- Portulaca olosirwa S.M.Phillips – Kenya
- Portulaca papillatostellulata (Danin & H.G.Baker) Danin – Europe to Mediterranean
- Portulaca papulifera D.Legrand – Argentina
- Portulaca papulosa Schltdl. – Argentina, Uruguay
- Portulaca paucistaminata Poelln. – Cuba
- Portulaca perennis R.E.Fr. – Argentina, Bolivia, Peru
- Portulaca peteri Poelln. – Ethiopia, Kenya, Tanzania
- Portulaca philippii I.M.Johnst. – Bolivia, Chile
- Portulaca pilosa L. – shaggy purslane – Hawaiian Islands, southern U.S.A. to Tropical & Subtropical S.America
- Portulaca psammotropha Hance – Southern China to Philippines
- Portulaca pusilla Kunth – Colombia, Venezuela
- Portulaca pygmaea Steyerm. – Colombia, Venezuela
- Portulaca quadrifida L. – chickenweed purslane – Tropical & Subtropical Old World to SW. Pacific
- Portulaca ragonesei D.Legrand – Argentina
- Portulaca ramosa Peter – Tanzania
- Portulaca rausii Danin – Mediterranean
- Portulaca rhodesiana R.A.Dyer & E.A.Bruce – South Africa, Zimbabwe
- Portulaca rotundifolia R.E.Fr. – Argentina, Bolivia
- Portulaca rubricaulis Kunth – redstem purslane – SE. Mexico, Florida to Caribbean, Venezuela to Ecuador
- Portulaca rzedowskiana Ocampo – showy flowers, native to high elevations of central Mexico
- Portulaca samhaensis A.G.Mill. – Socotra
- Portulaca samoensis Poelln. – New Guinea to SW. Pacific
- Portulaca sanctae-martae Poelln. – Colombia
- Portulaca sardoa Danin, Bagella & Marrosu – Corsica, Sardinia
- Portulaca saxifragoides Welw. ex Oliv. – Angola
- Portulaca sclerocarpa A.Gray – ʻIhi makole – Hawaiian Islands
- Portulaca sedifolia N.E.Br. – French Guiana, Guyana, Suriname, Venezuela
- Portulaca sedoides Welw. ex Oliv. – Angola
- Portulaca sicula Danin, Domina & Raimondo – Sicilia
- Portulaca smallii P.Wilson – Small's purslane – Georgia, North Carolina, South Carolina, Virginia
- Portulaca socotrana Domina & Raimondo – Socotra
- Portulaca somalica N.E.Br. – Somalia
- Portulaca stellulatotuberculata Poelln. – Paraguay
- Portulaca stuhlmannii Poelln. – Tanzania
- Portulaca suffrutescens Engelm. – shrubby purslane – Arizona, Mexico, New Mexico, Texas
- Portulaca suffruticosa Wight – India, Sri Lanka
- Portulaca sundaensis Poelln. – Lesser Sunda Islands
- Portulaca thellusonii Lindl. – Brazil
- Portulaca tingoensis J.F.Macbr. – Argentina, Peru
- Portulaca trianthemoides Bremek. – Limpopo
- Portulaca trituberculata Danin, Domina & Raimondo – Canary Islands, E. Central Europe to Mediterranean
- Portulaca tuberculata León – Cuba, Cayman Islands
- Portulaca tuberosa Roxb. – Indian subcontinent to N. Australia
- Portulaca umbraticola Kunth – wingpod purslane – Mexico to Tropical America
- Portulaca werdermannii Poelln. – Brazil
- Portulaca wightiana Wall. ex Wight & Arn. – South Africa to Ethiopia, India, Sri Lanka
- Portulaca yecorensis Henrickson & T.Van Devender – Mexico
- Portulaca zaffranii Danin – Mediterranean

=== Formerly placed here ===
- Anacampseros arachnoides (Haw.) Sims (as P. arachnoides Haw.)
- Anacampseros filamentosa subsp. filamentosa (as P. filamentosa Haw.)
- Anacampseros lanceolata subsp. lanceolata (as P. lanceolata Haw.)
- Anacampseros rufescens (Haw.) Sweet (as P. rufescens Haw.)
- Anacampseros telephiastrum DC. (as P. anacampseros L.)
- Sesuvium portulacastrum (L.) L. (as P. portulacastrum L.)
- Talinum fruticosum (L.) Juss. (as P. fruticosa L. or P. triangularis Jacq.)
- Talinum paniculatum (Jacq.) Gaertn. (as P. paniculata Jacq. or P. patens L.)

== Gallery ==
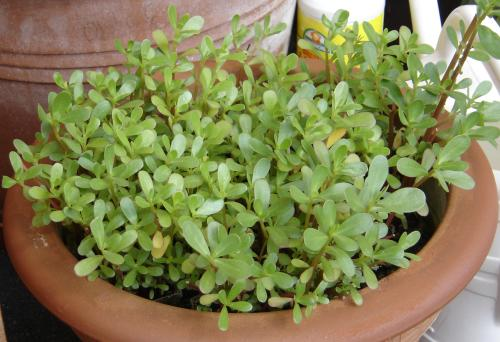
Purslane cultivar

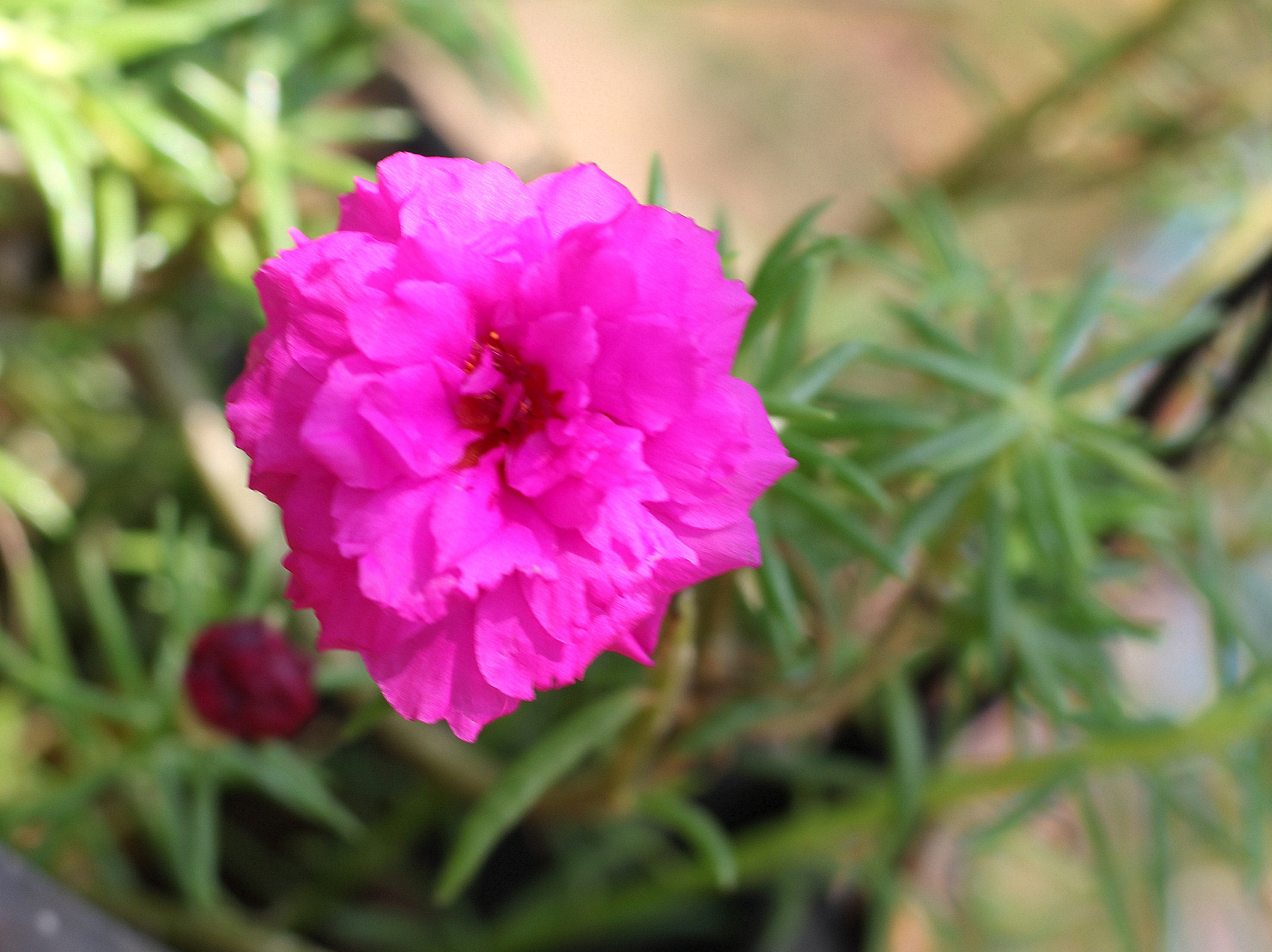
Portulaca flowers

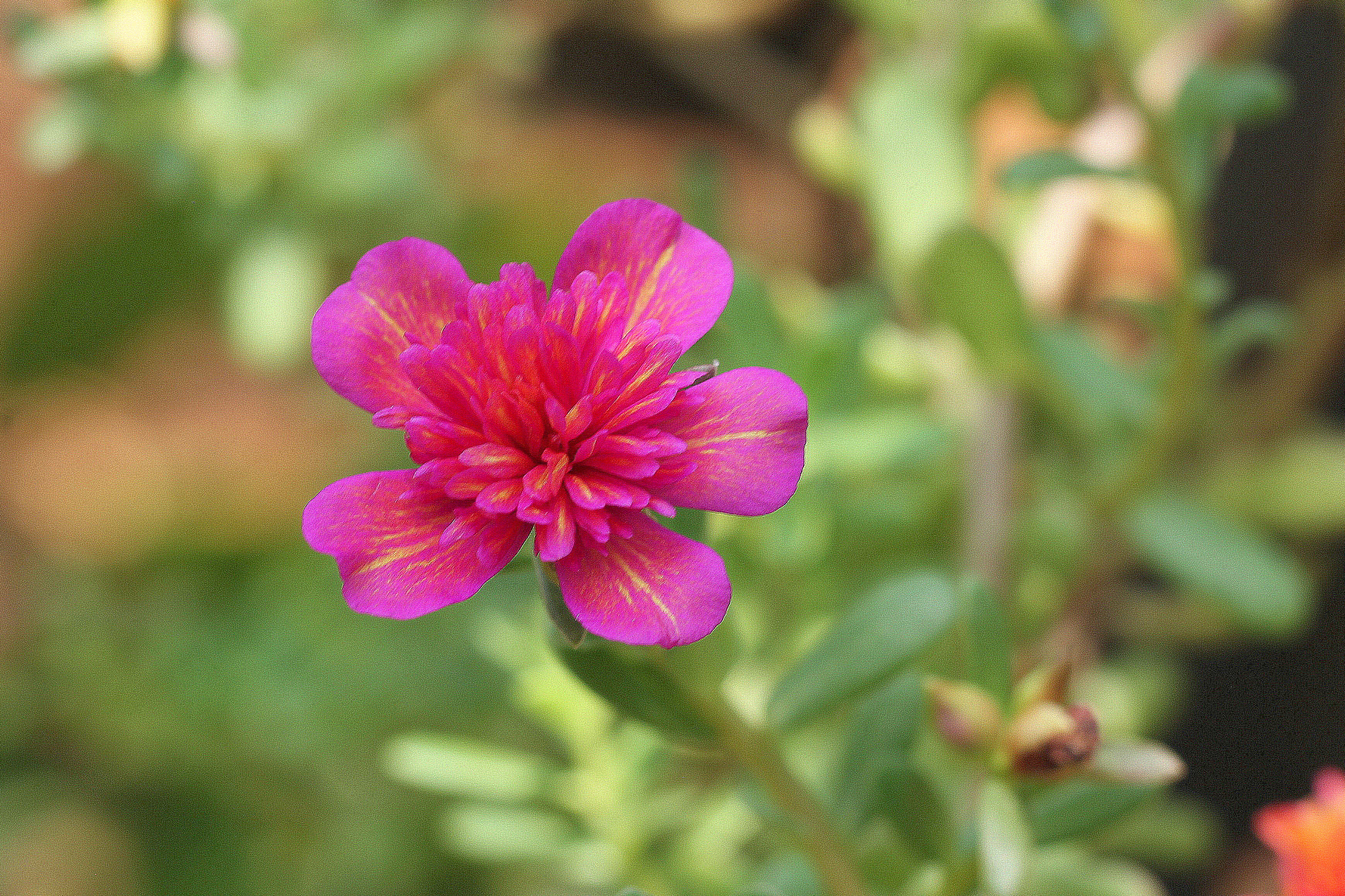
Portulaca flowers

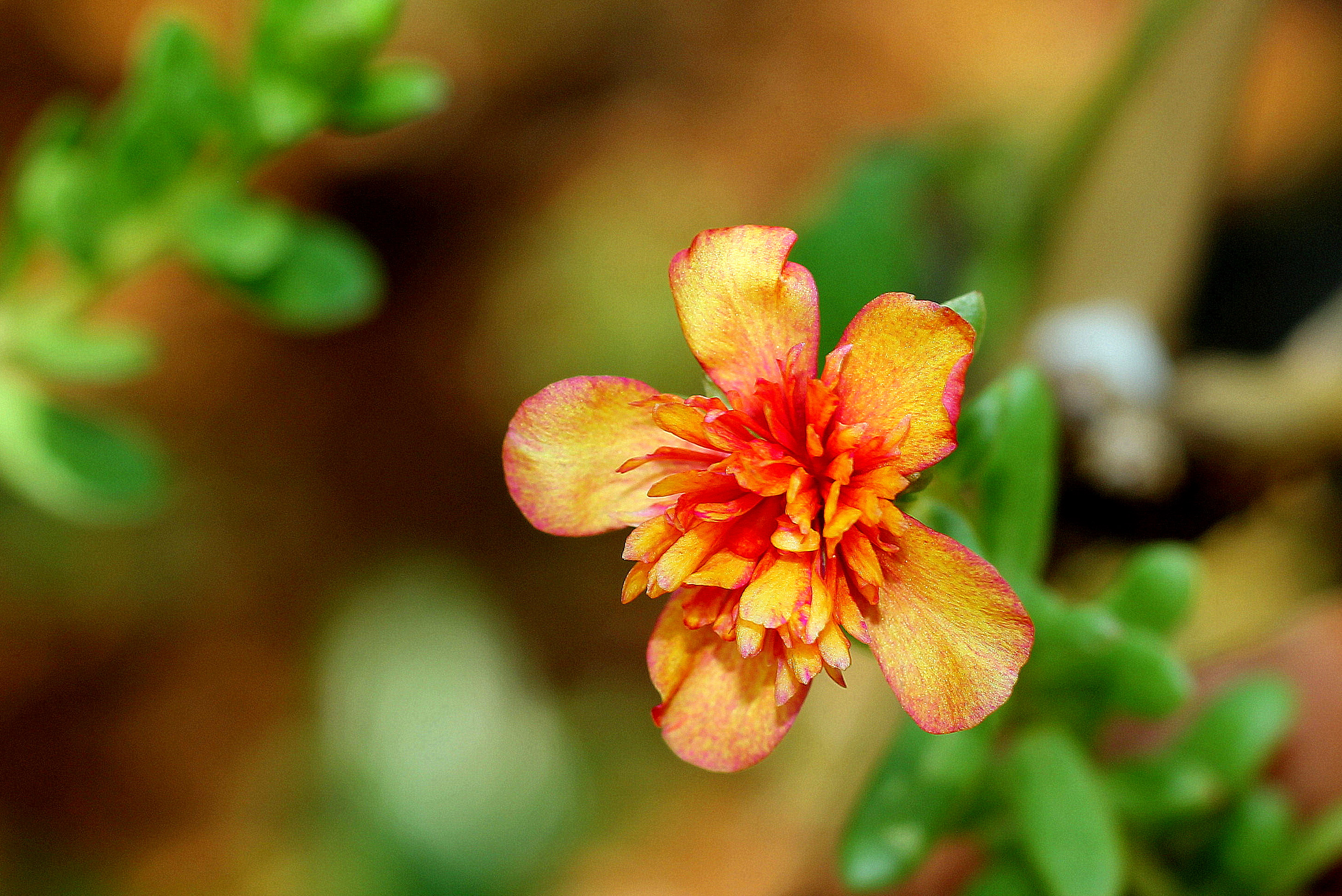
Portulaca flowers

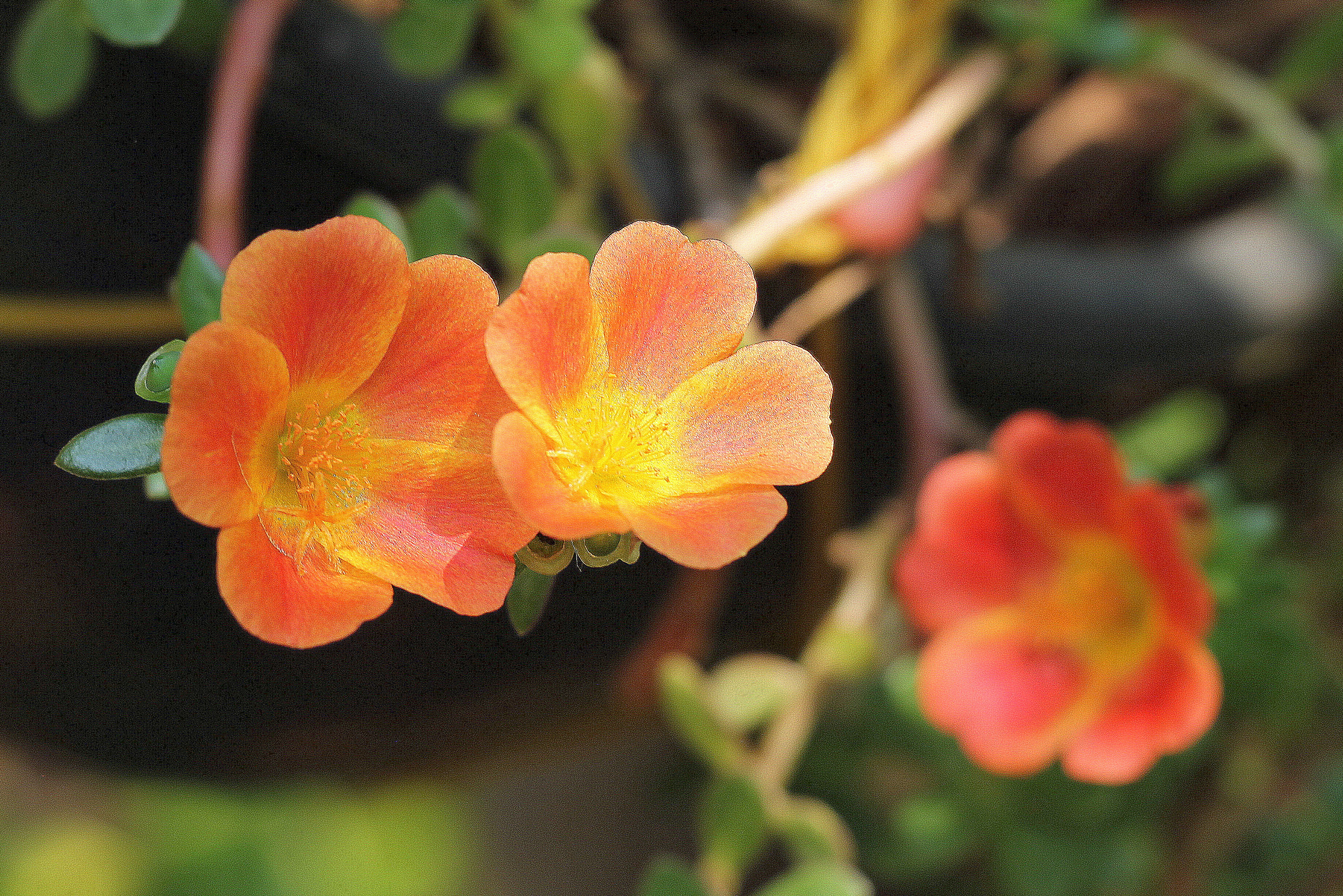
Portulaca flowers

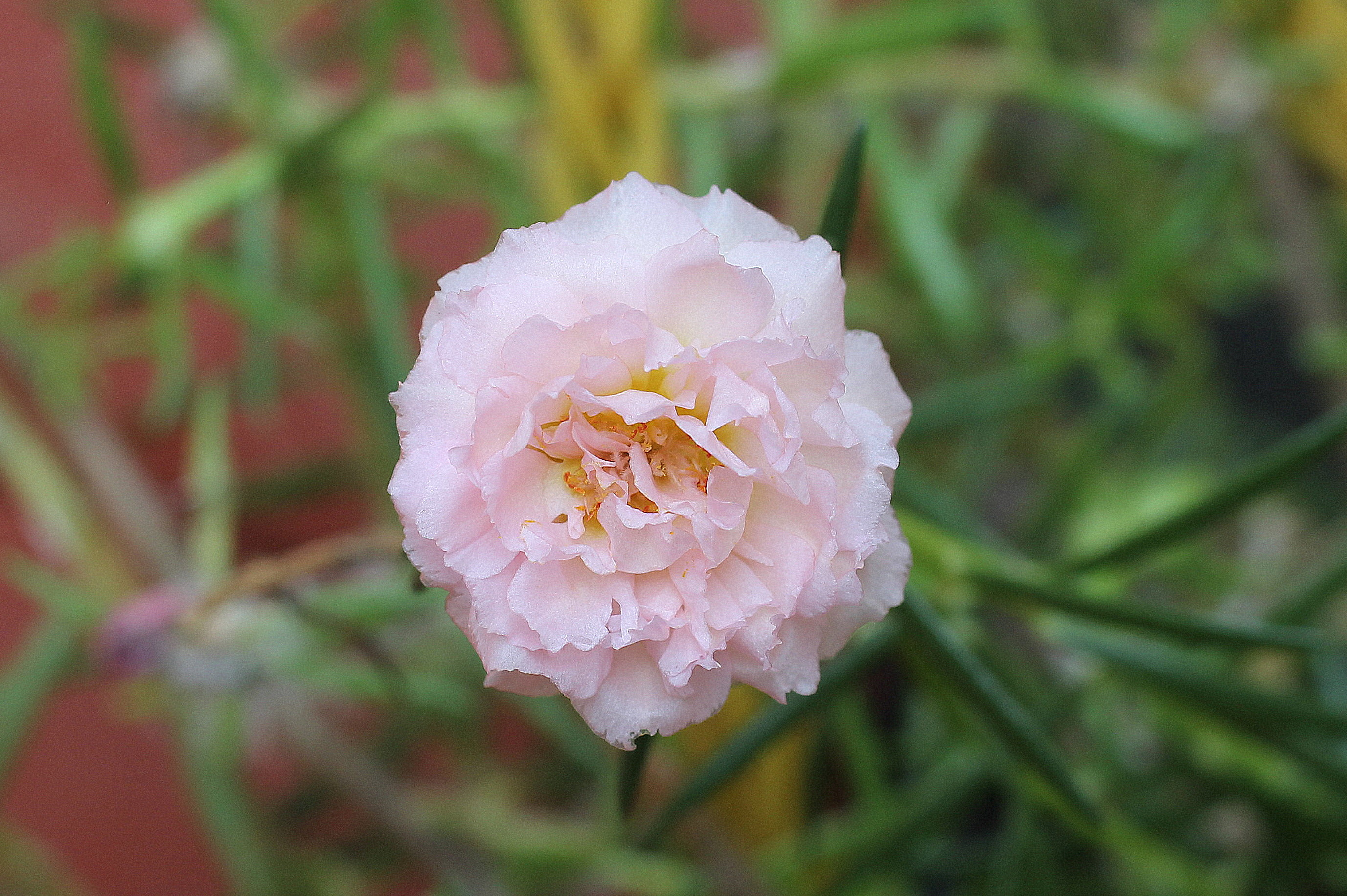
Portulaca flowers

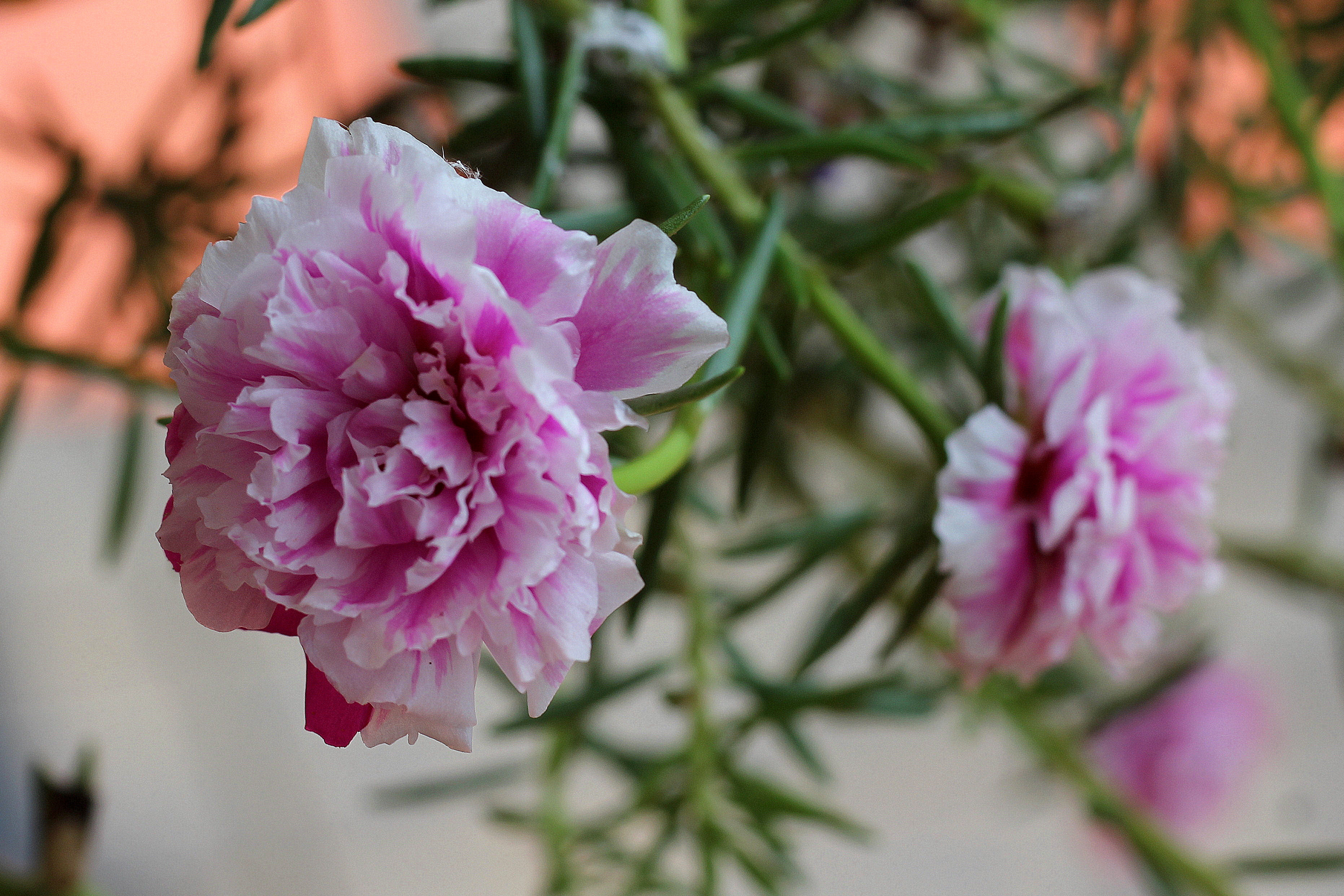
Portulaca flowers

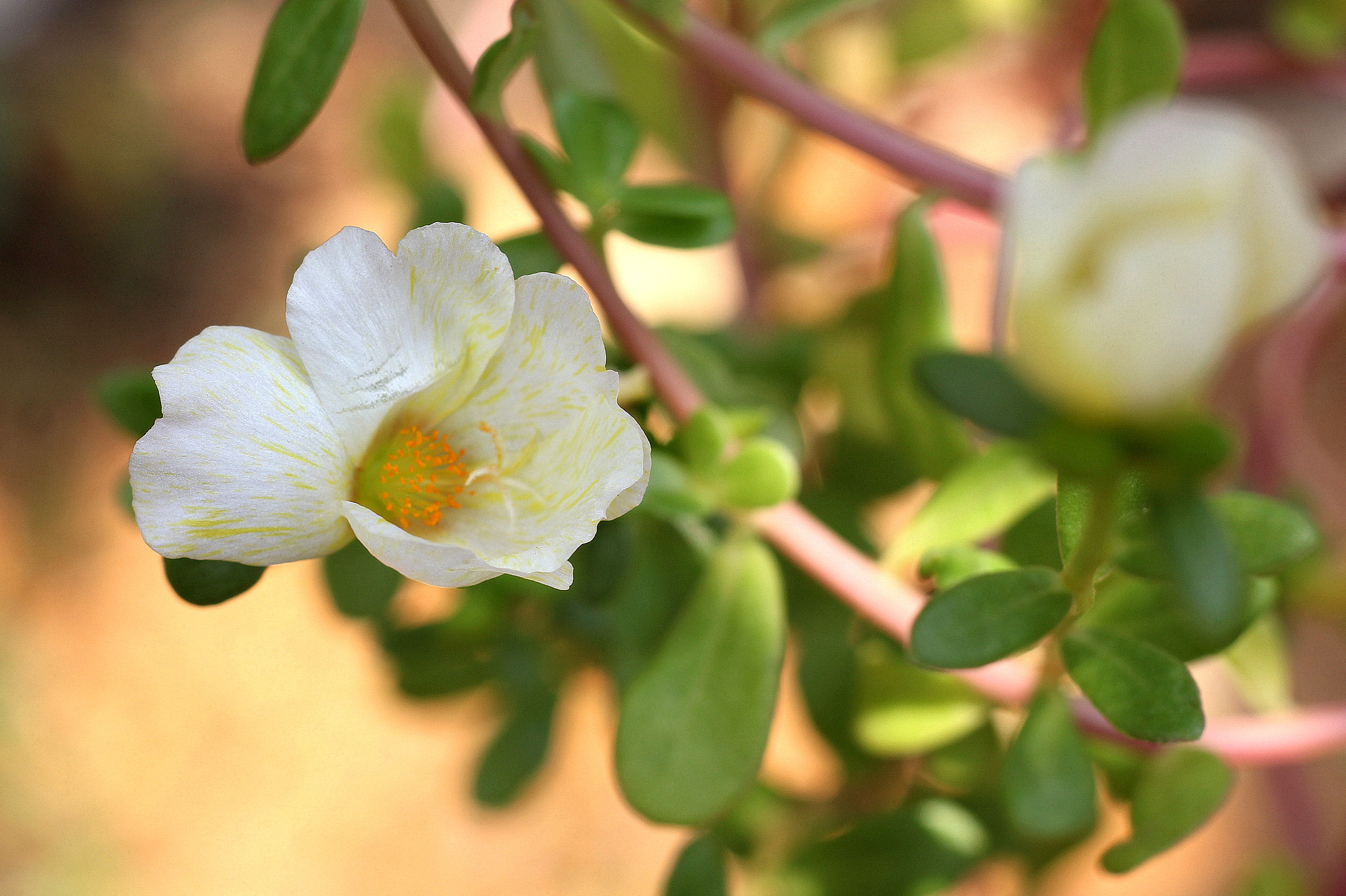
Portulaca flowers

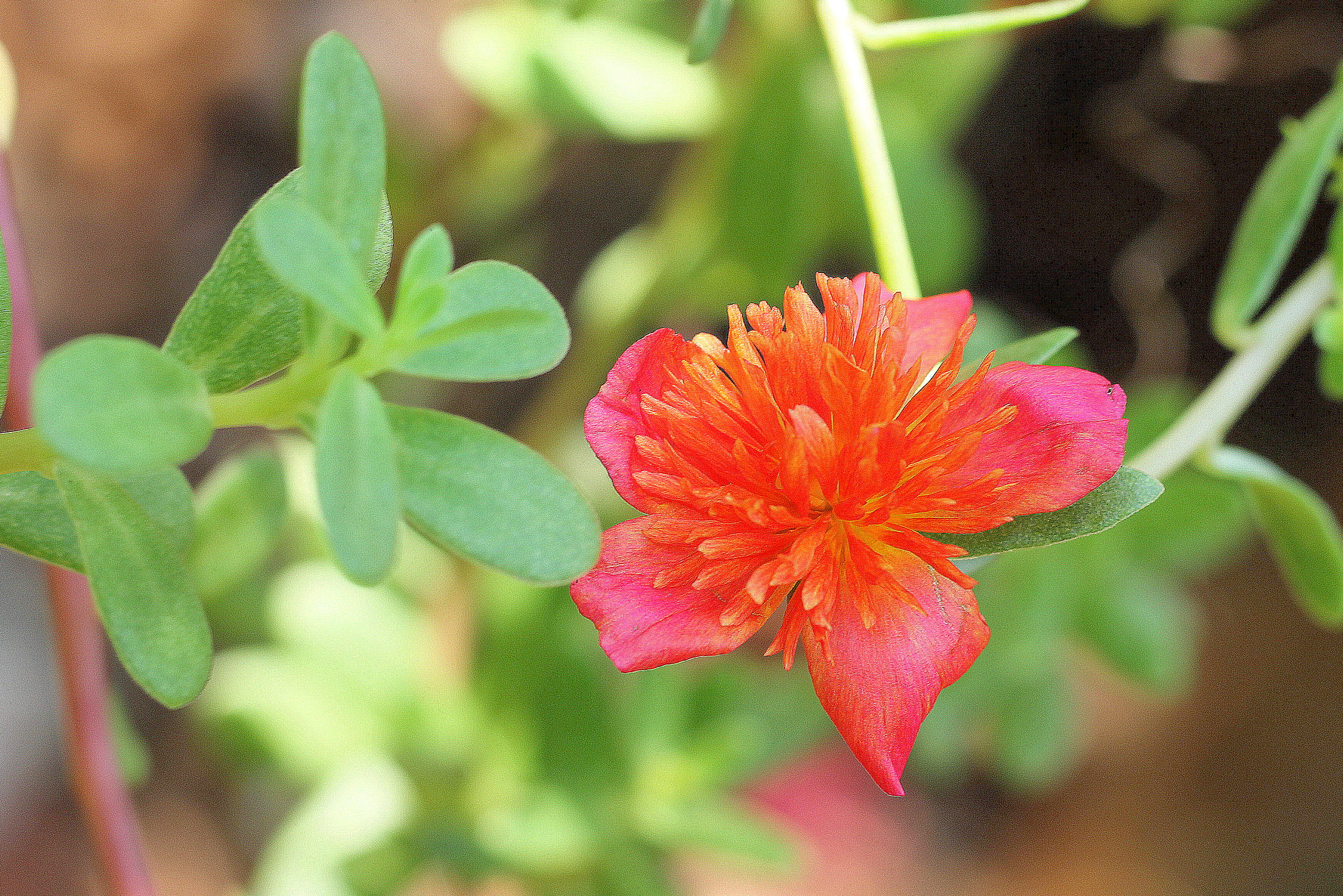
Portulaca flowers

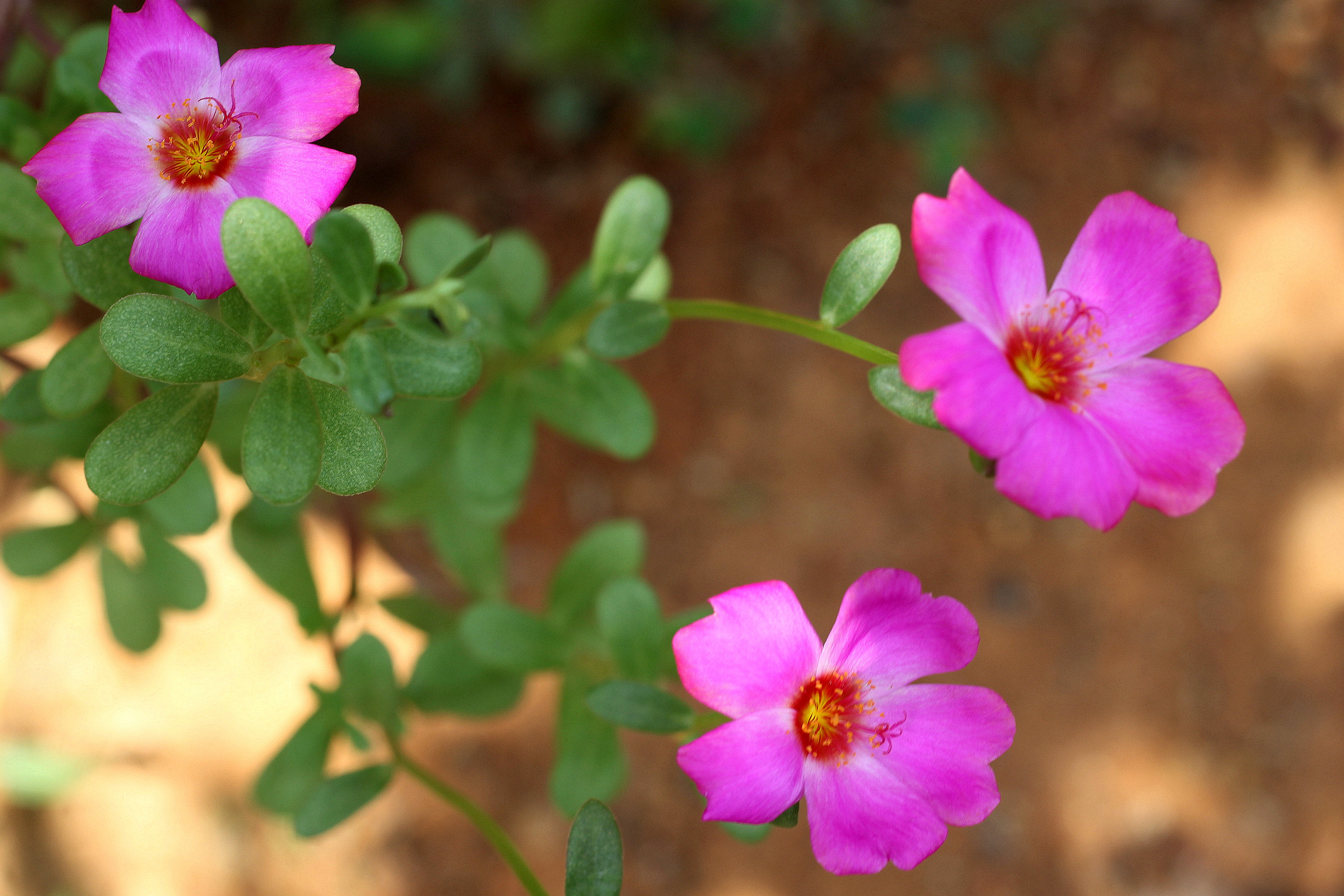
Portulaca flowers

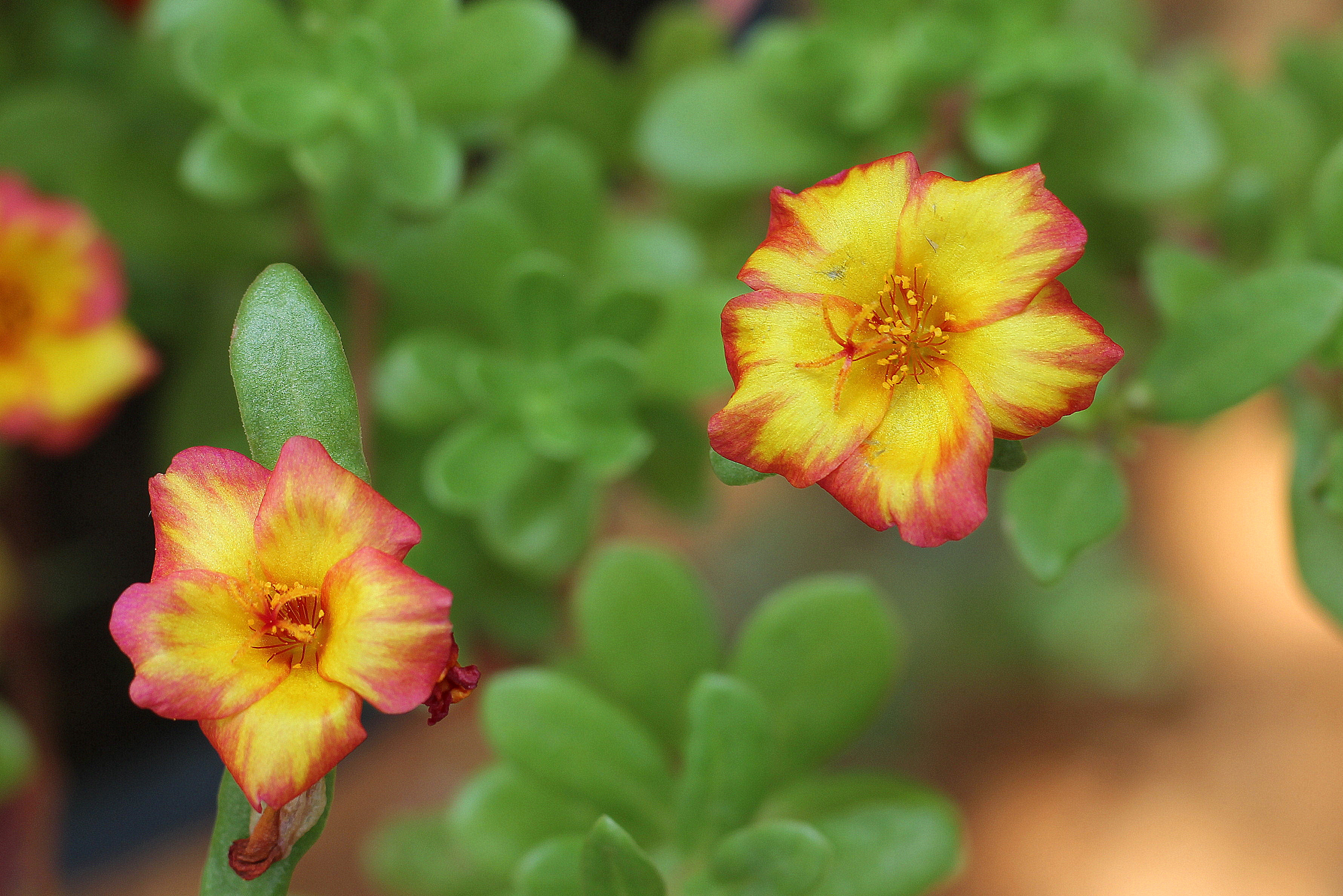
Portulaca flowers

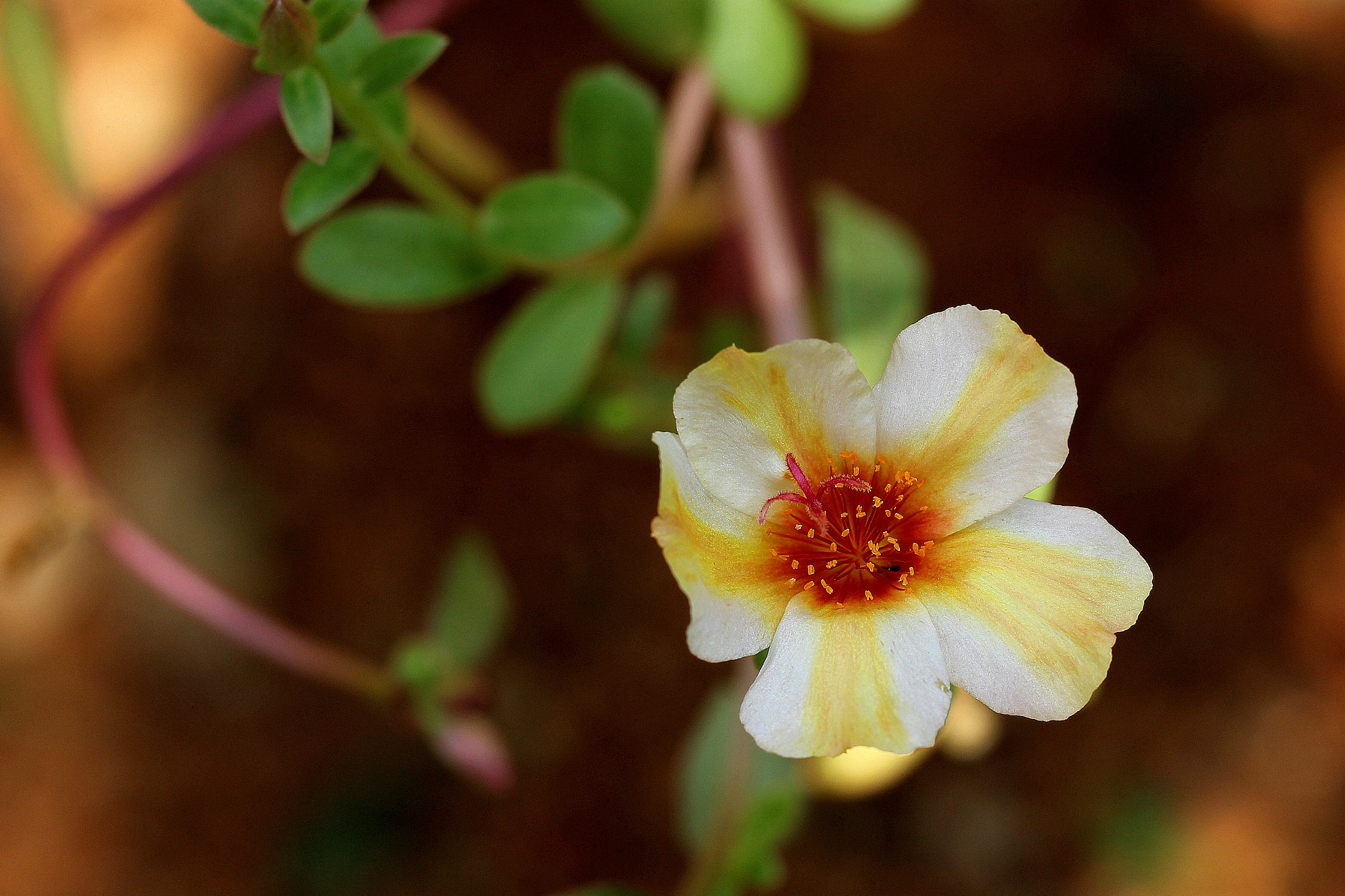
Portulaca flowers

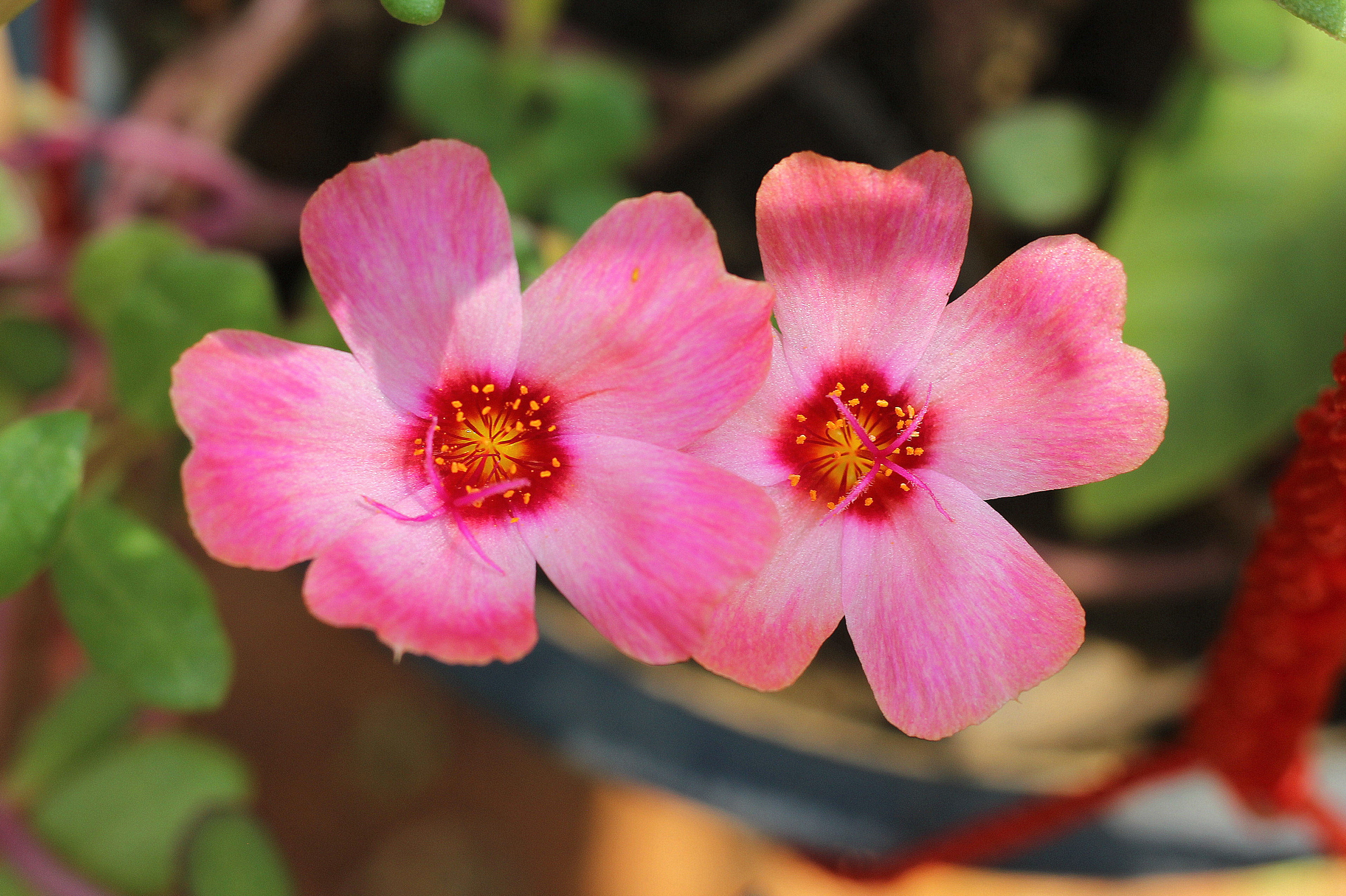
Portulaca flowers

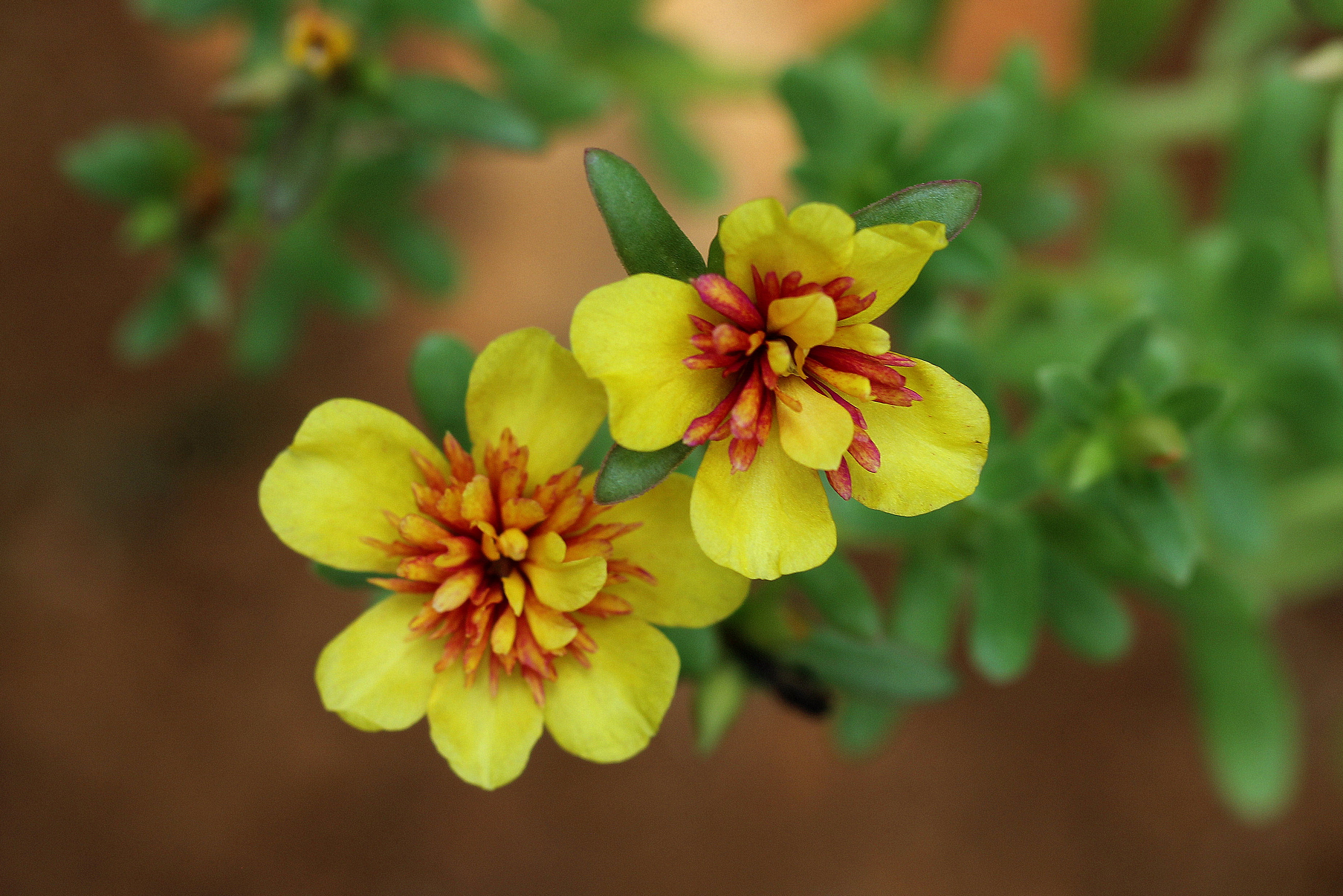
Portulaca flowers

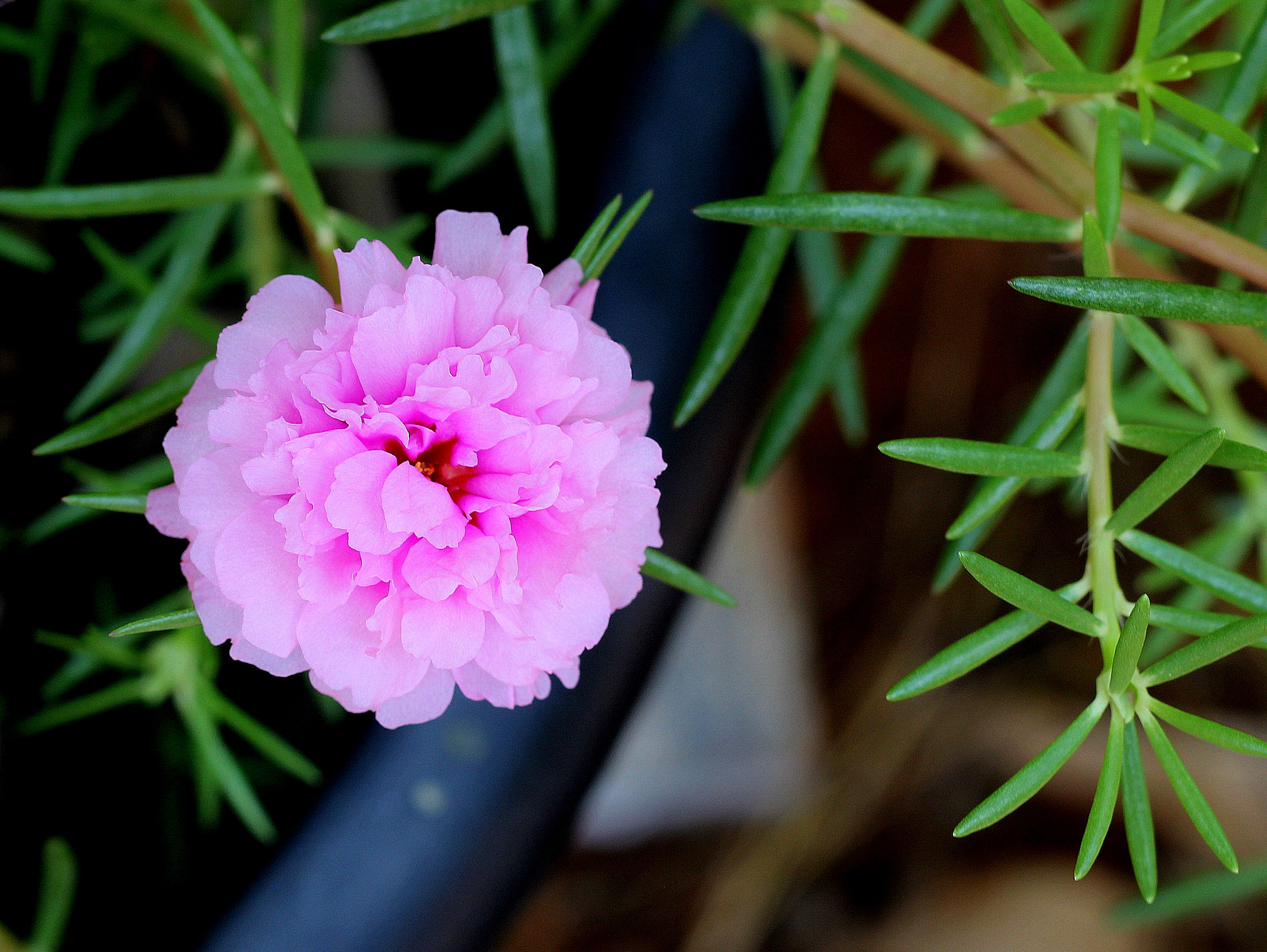
Portulaca flowers

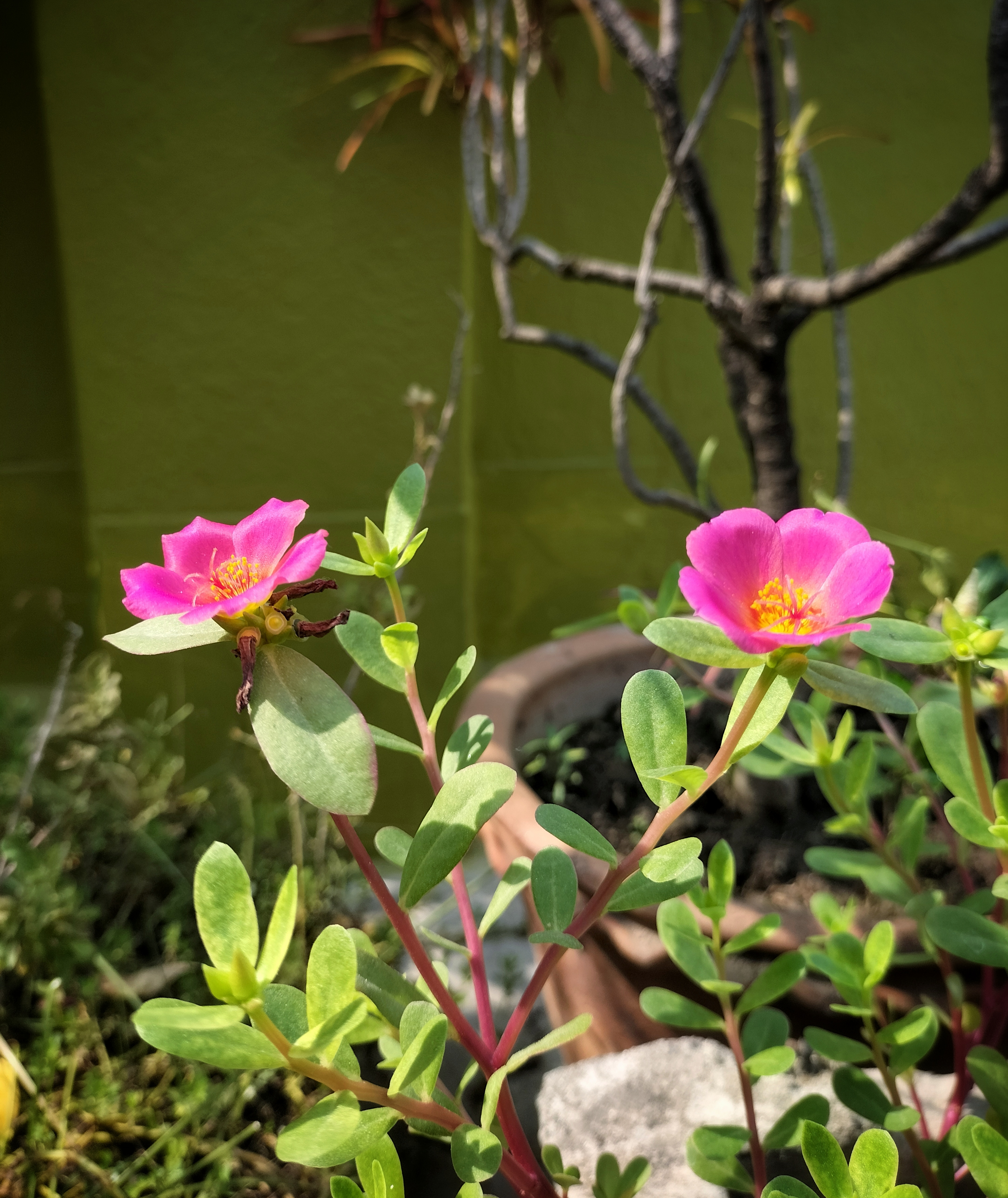
Portulaca flowers
