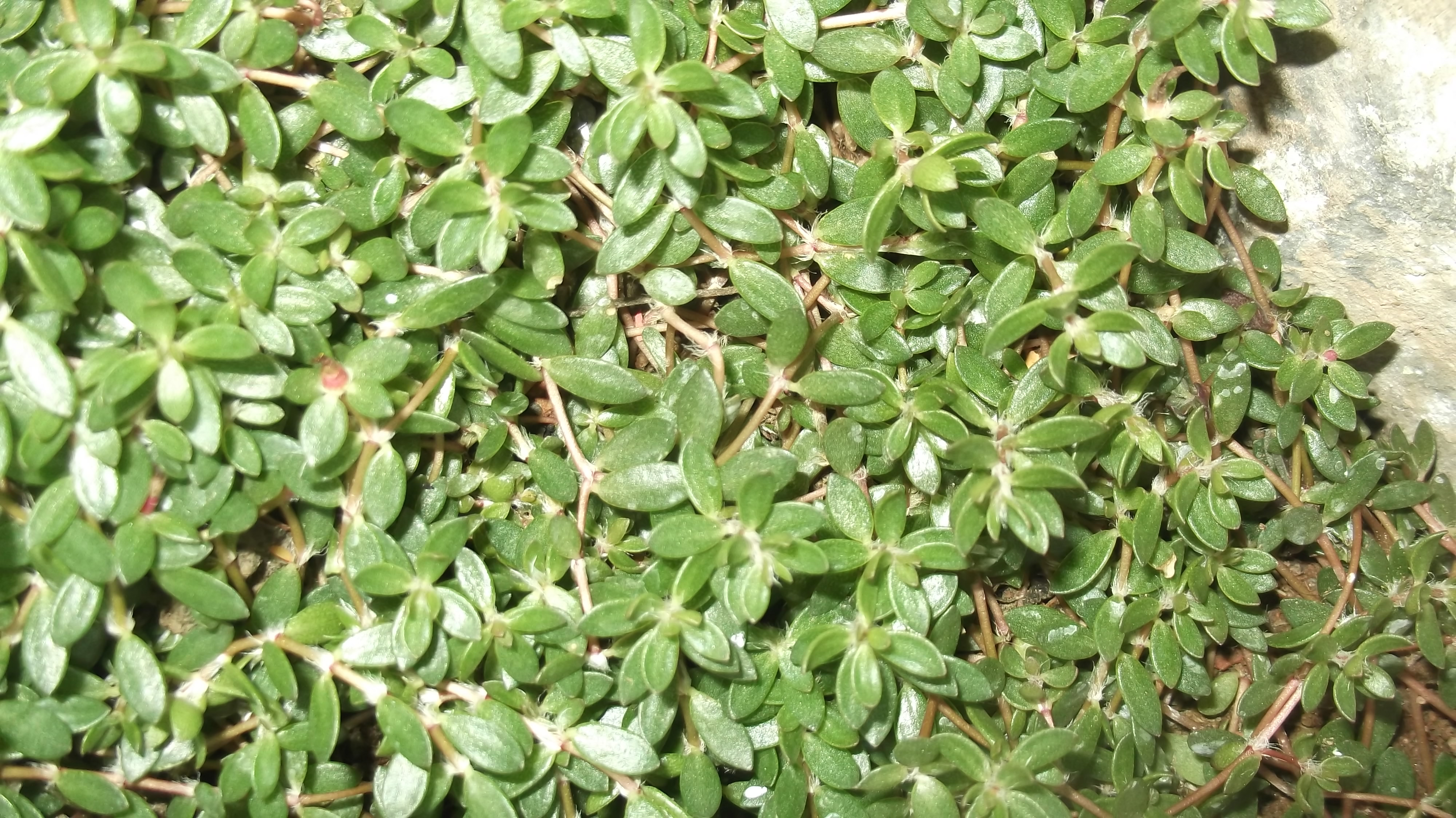

Scientific classification
- Kingdom: Plantae
- Clade: Embryophytes
- Clade: Tracheophytes
- Clade: Spermatophytes
- Clade: Angiosperms
- Clade: Eudicots
- Order: Caryophyllales
- Family: Portulacaceae
- Genus: Portulaca
- Species: P. quadrifida

Binomial name
- Portulaca quadrifida L.

Synonyms
- List: Illecebrum verticillatum Burm.f.; Meridiana elliptica Poir.; Meridiana quadrifida (L.) Poir.; Portulaca chariensis A.Chev.; Portulaca diptera Zipp. ex Span.; Portulaca elatinoides A.Chev.; Portulaca geniculata Royle; Portulaca imbricata Forssk.; Portulaca linifolia Forssk.; Portulaca meridiana L.f.; Portulaca microphylla A.Rich.; Portulaca parensis Poelln.; Portulaca pseudoquadrifida Poelln.; Portulaca rediviva Wawra; Portulaca repens Roxb. ex Wight & Arn.; Portulaca rubens A.Chev.; Portulaca squarrosa Peter; Portulaca walteriana Poelln.

= Portulaca quadrifida =

Species of flowering plant

Portulaca quadrifida, known as pusley, wild purslane, chicken weed (or chickenweed), single‑flowered purslane, small‑leaved purslane and 10 o'clock plant, is a species of flowering plant in the genus Portulaca, possibly native to Africa, but certainly widespread over the Old World Tropics, and introduced elsewhere. It is collected in the wild and eaten in salads or cooked, and is a favorite fodder for chickens and pigs.

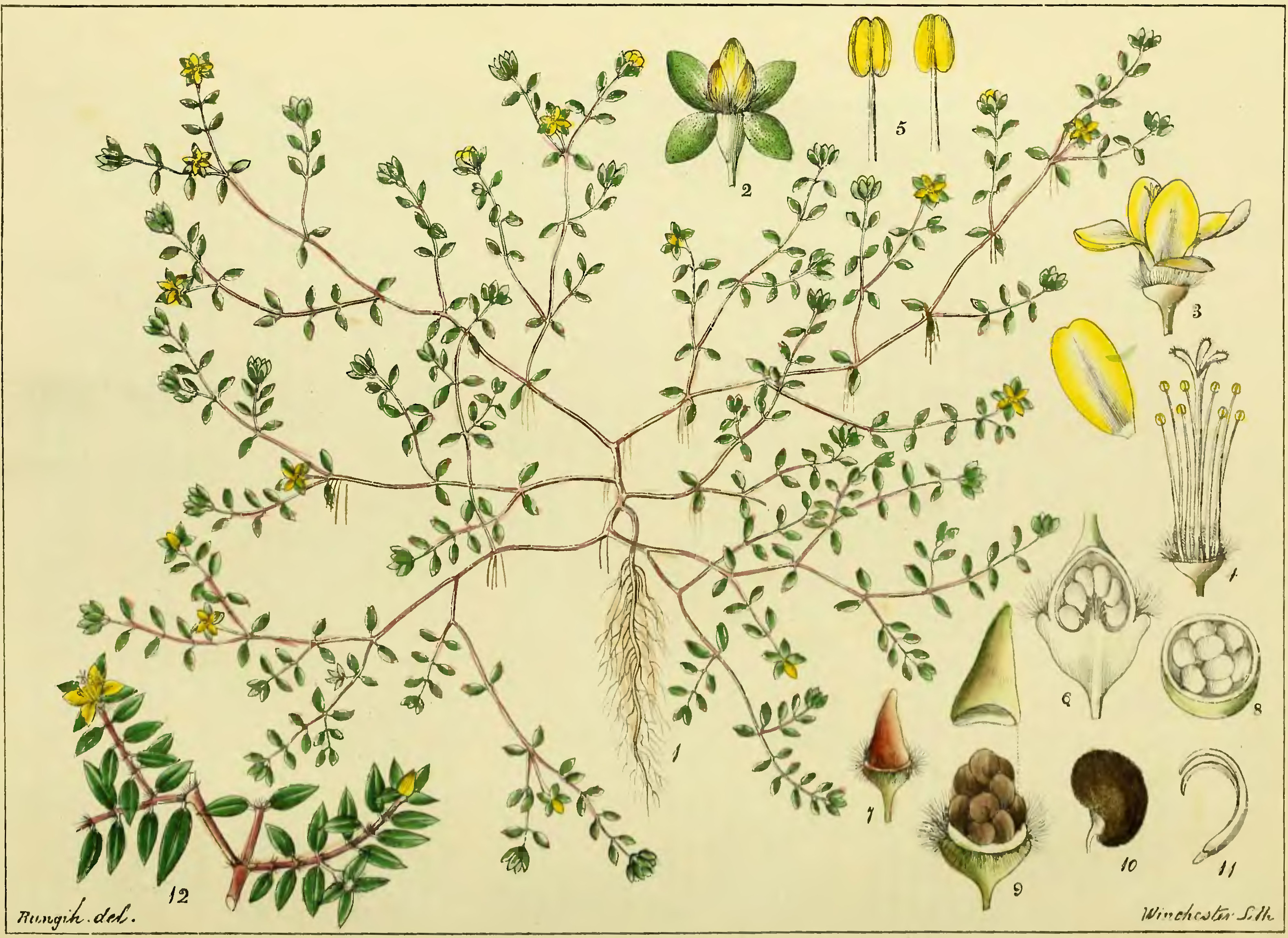
Botanical illustration of Portulaca quadrifida
