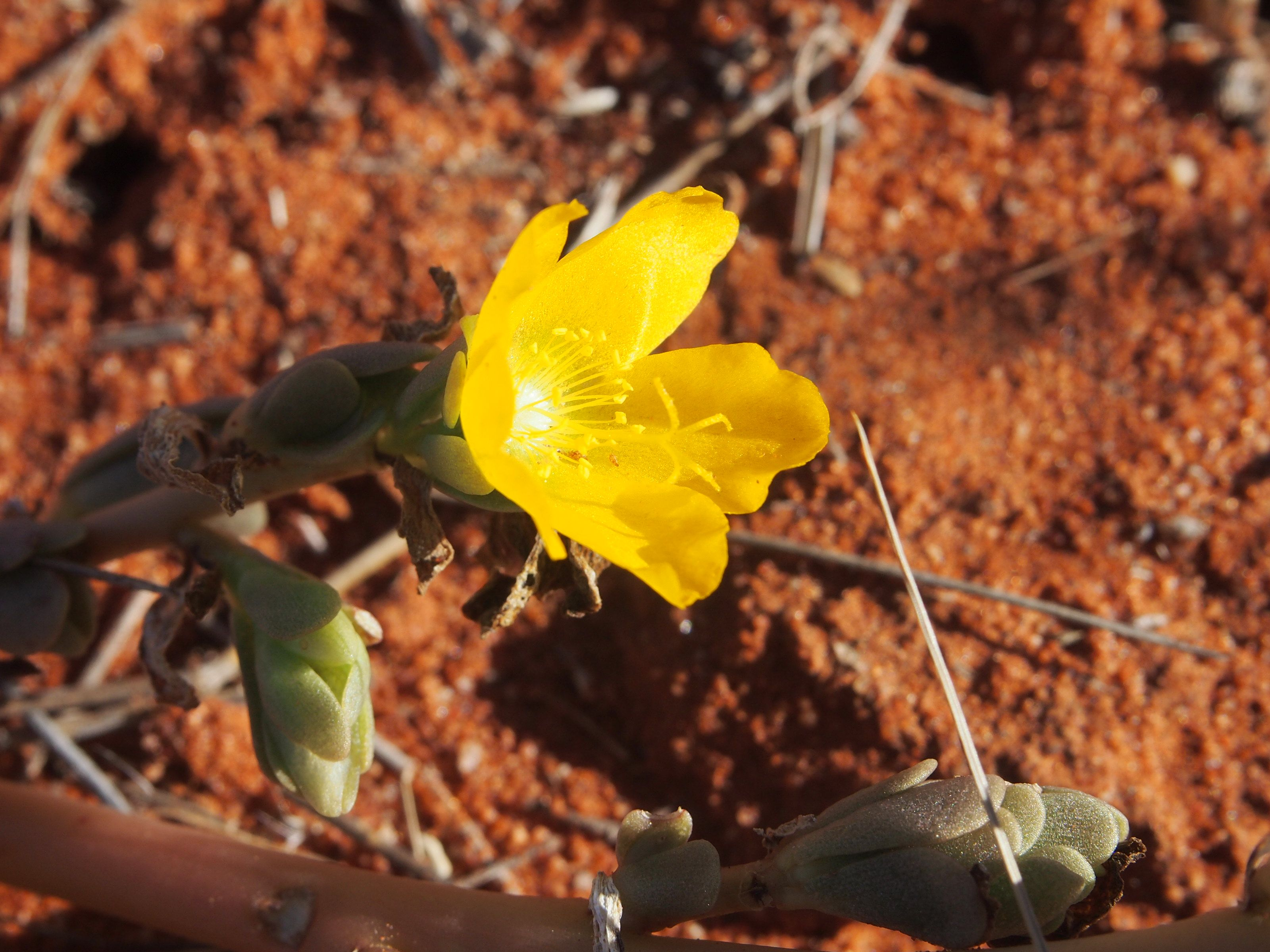

Scientific classification
- Kingdom: Plantae
- Clade: Tracheophytes
- Clade: Angiosperms
- Clade: Eudicots
- Order: Caryophyllales
- Family: Portulacaceae
- Genus: Portulaca
- Species: P. intraterranea

Binomial name
- Portulaca intraterranea J.M.Black

= Portulaca intraterranea =

Species of plant

Portulaca intraterranea, the large pigweed, is a succulent herb native to deserts of central Australia.

The leaves are succulent, with flowers 2.5–3.5 cm wide. Aboriginal Australians eat the thick tap-root which tastes like potato.Like most plants in the portulacaceae family they use belatins instead of antocyanins. Their leaves are thick usually 0.25 cm-0.75 cm to store water.

Their leaves have to ability switch between C4 and CAM photosynthesis. This helps them grow fast and survive drought.

The flowers have 5-6 petals and usually 4 stamens though that can change through mutations. Their placental structure is free central.

The roots are thick taproots used to access moister soil below the surface. Their stem has a thin cuticle followed by bundle of unspecialised parenchyma cells.After that is the phloem and in the centre the xylem.
