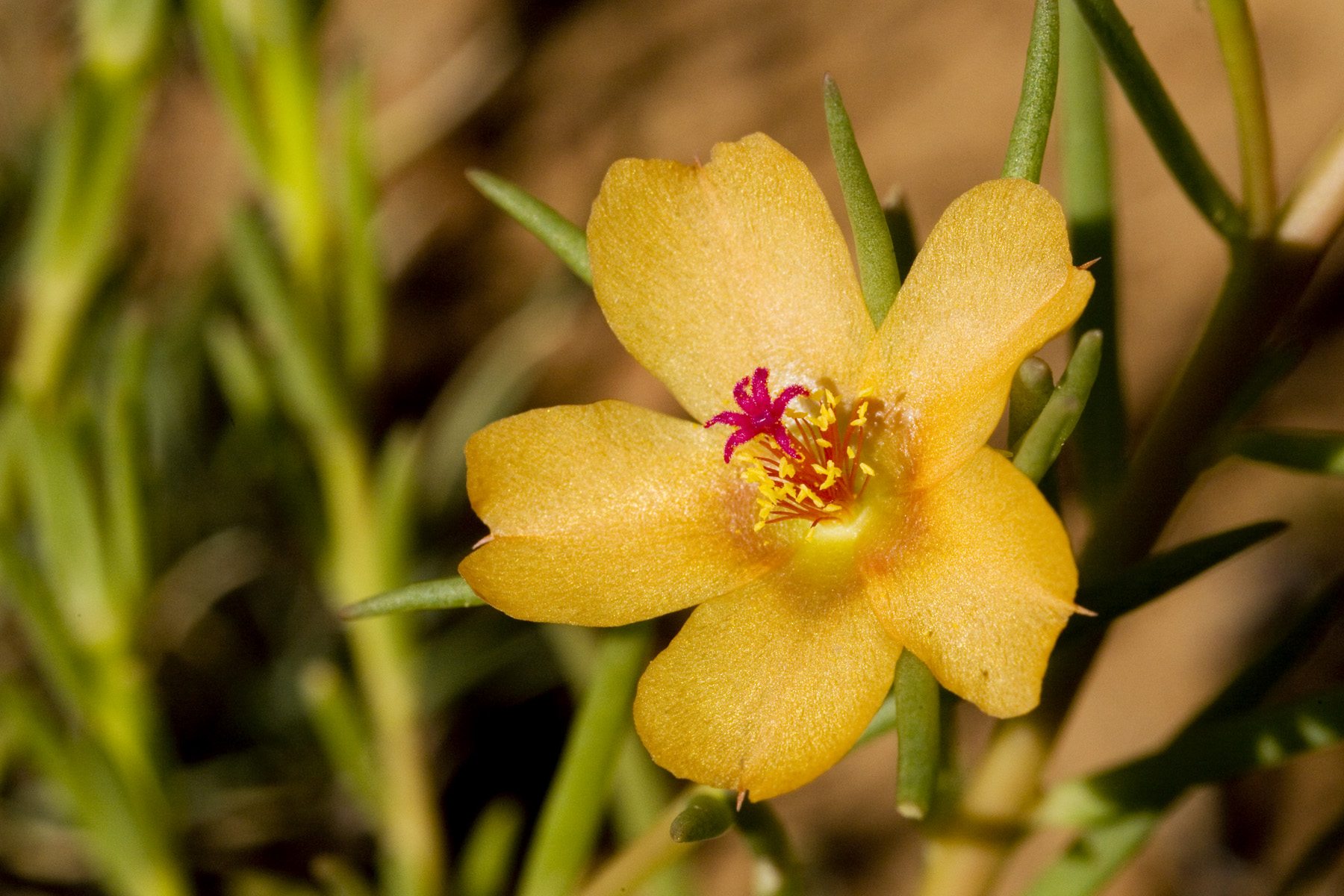

Scientific classification
- Kingdom: Plantae
- Clade: Embryophytes
- Clade: Tracheophytes
- Clade: Spermatophytes
- Clade: Angiosperms
- Clade: Eudicots
- Order: Caryophyllales
- Family: Portulacaceae
- Genus: Portulaca
- Species: P. suffrutescens

Binomial name
- Portulaca suffrutescens Engelm. 1881

= Portulaca suffrutescens =

Shrubby purslane, Copper purslane

Species of shrub

Portulaca suffrutescens, the shrubby purslane, also called copper purslane, is a plant species native to the southwestern United States and northern and central Mexico. It has been found in Arizona, New Mexico, Texas, Sonora, Chihuahua, Sinaloa, Durango, Querétaro and Guerrero.

Portulaca suffrutescens is a perennial with tuberous roots. Stems are stiff, erect, up to 30 cm (12 inches) tall. Leaves are needle-like, round in cross-section, up to 3 cm (1.2 inches) long. Flowers are orange, copper or bronze, up to 25 mm (1 inch) across. Seeds are black with a row of small bumps along one side.
