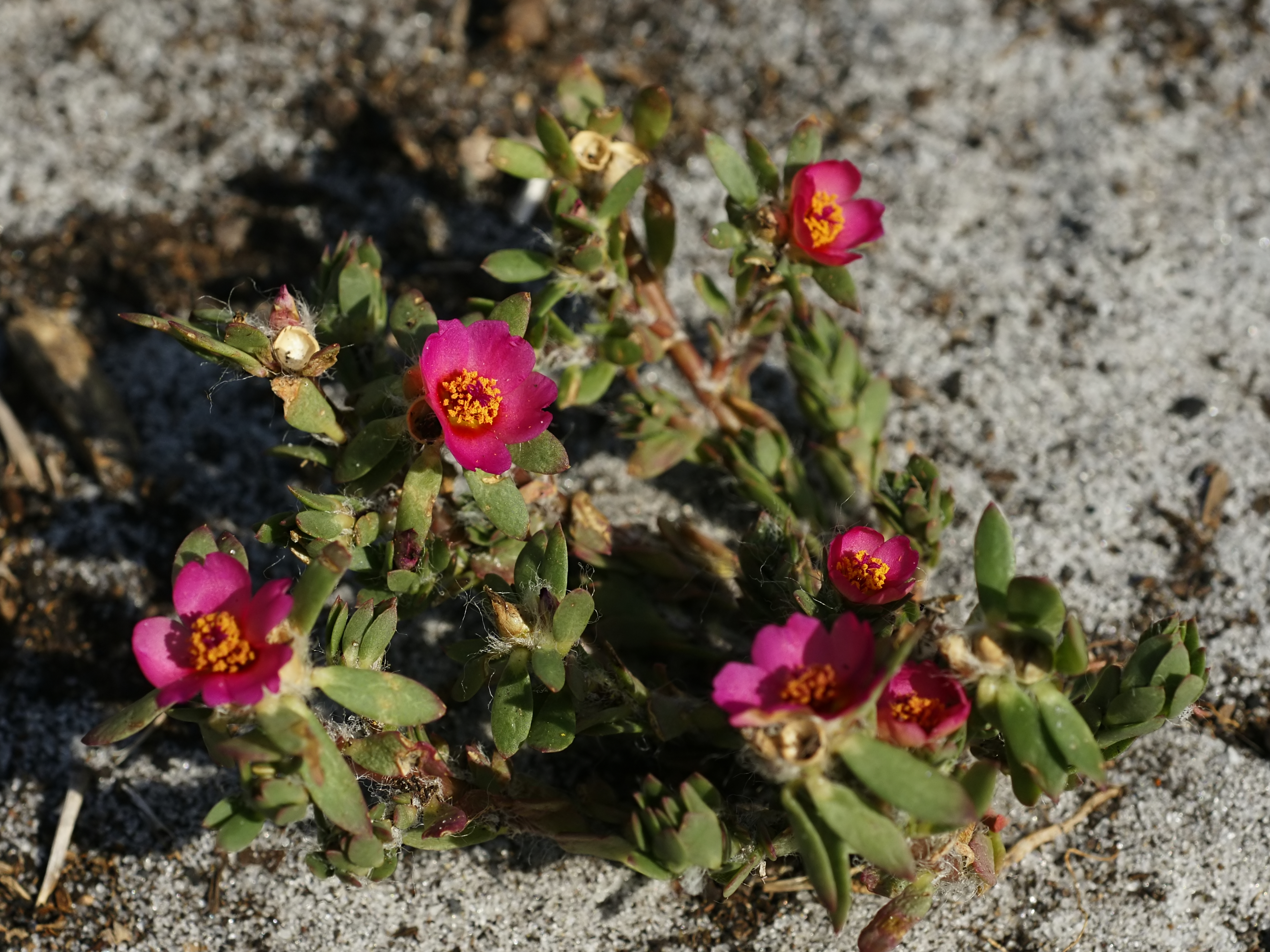

Scientific classification
- Kingdom: Plantae
- Clade: Tracheophytes
- Clade: Angiosperms
- Clade: Eudicots
- Order: Caryophyllales
- Family: Portulacaceae
- Genus: Portulaca
- Species: P. amilis

Binomial name
- Portulaca amilis Speg.

= Portulaca amilis =

Species of flowering plant

Portulaca amilis, known as Paraguayan purslane, is a species of Portulaca native to South America. It was introduced to the southeastern United States and other countries around the world and can be found in sandy soil in disturbed areas, roadsides, fields, lawns and gardens.

== Description ==
Appearance is similar to Portulaca oleracea. The ends of the foliage are sharp and flowers are normally pink.
