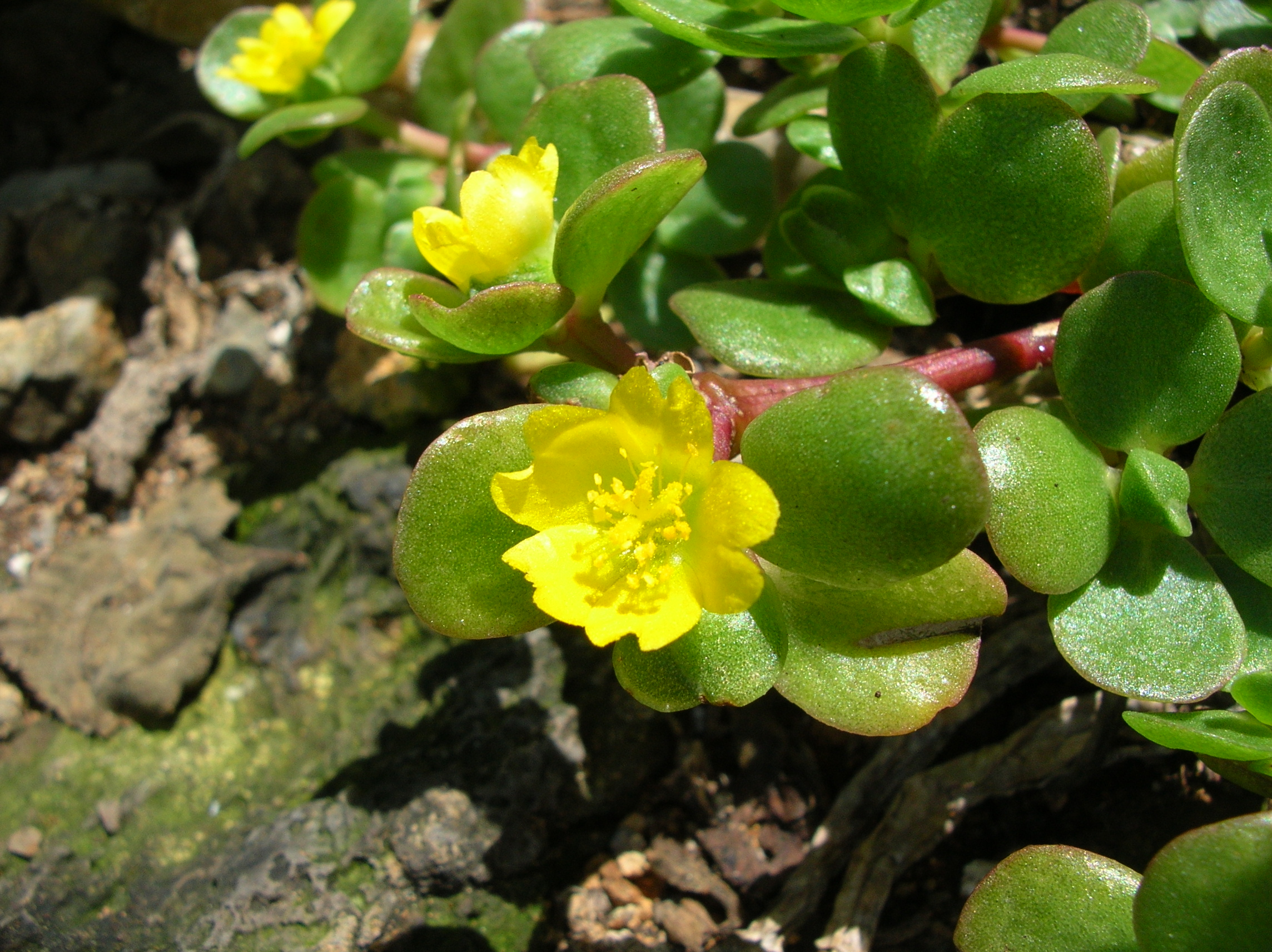

Scientific classification
- Kingdom: Plantae
- Clade: Tracheophytes
- Clade: Angiosperms
- Clade: Eudicots
- Order: Caryophyllales
- Family: Portulacaceae
- Genus: Portulaca
- Species: P. lutea

Binomial name
- Portulaca lutea Sol. ex G.Forst.

= Portulaca lutea =

Species of portulaca

Portulaca lutea, the native yellow purslane, is a species of Portulaca that is indigenous to all of the main islands of Hawaii except for Kaua'i and is widespread throughout the Pacific Islands.

== Ecology ==
Portulaca lutea is very much like Sesuvium portulacastrum, it is a pan tropical, sea-dispersed beach succulent that can spread and even travel as vegetative fragments which are tolerant of salt water and root easily on landing. It grows on a variety of soils, including lava, coral and sand dunes, in coastal areas from sea level to 390 metres above sea level.

== Appearance ==
The leaves are oval to round and range in size to 24 mm long. One to three yellow flowers are borne at the ends of the stems. Differs from Portulaca oleracea in having grey bark on old sections & large flowers with petals 12 mm long, and an ovoid fruit opening by a cap that splits off to release the many tiny black seeds.
